= 2020 Queensland mayoral elections =

- 28 March 2020

The 2020 Queensland mayoral elections was held on 28 March 2020 to elect the mayors of the 77 local government areas in Queensland, Australia. The elections were held as part of the statewide local elections.

== Results ==
=== Aurukun ===
2020 Queensland mayoral elections: Aurukun
Party	Candidate	Votes	%	±%
Independent	Kerri Tamwoy	298	55.49	
Independent	Barbara Bandicootcha	132	24.58	
Independent	Dereck Walpo	107	19.93	
Turnout		543	67.04	
Two-candidate-preferred result
Independent	Kerri Tamwoy	315	68.78	
Independent	Barbara Bandicootcha	143	31.22	
Independent gain from Independent		Swing		

=== Balonne ===
2020 Queensland mayoral elections: Balonne
Party	Candidate	Votes	%	±%
Independent	Samantha O'Toole	1,294	55.56	
Independent	Richard Marsh	1,035	44.44	
Turnout		2,346	80.70	
Independent gain from Independent		Swing		

=== Banana ===
2020 Queensland mayoral elections: Banana
Party	Candidate	Votes	%	±%
Independent	Neville Ferrier	unopposed		
Independent hold		Swing		

=== Barcaldine ===
2020 Queensland mayoral elections: Barcaldine
Party	Candidate	Votes	%	±%
Independent LNP	Sean Dillon	721	41.15	
Independent	Rob Chandler	626	35.73	
Independent	Bob O'Brien	303	17.29	
Independent Labor	Sharon Broughton	102	5.82	
Turnout		1,765	85.39	
Two-candidate-preferred result
Independent LNP	Sean Dillon	835	53.94	
Independent	Rob Chandler	713	46.06	
Independent LNP gain from Independent		Swing		

=== Barcoo ===
2020 Queensland mayoral elections: Barcoo
Party	Candidate	Votes	%	±%
Independent	Sally O'Neil	103	60.23	
Independent	Shane Buckley	68	39.77	
Turnout		173	82.78	
Independent hold		Swing		

- Incumbent mayor Bruce Scott (Independent) did not recontest

=== Blackall-Tambo ===
2020 Queensland mayoral elections: Blackall-Tambo
Party	Candidate	Votes	%	±%
Independent LNP	Andrew Martin	794	64.92	
Independent	Peter Skewes	429	35.08	
Turnout		1,230	86.62	
Independent LNP hold		Swing		

=== Boulia ===
2020 Queensland mayoral elections: Boulia
Party	Candidate	Votes	%	±%
Independent	Eric Britton	unopposed		
Independent hold		Swing		

=== Brisbane ===
2020 Queensland mayoral elections: Brisbane
Party	Candidate	Votes	%	±%
Liberal National	Adrian Schrinner	292,895	47.74	−5.64
Labor	Pat Condren	189,832	30.94	−1.02
Greens	Kath Angus	94,481	15.40	+5.0
Animal Justice	Karagh-Mae Kelly	19,022	3.10	+3.10
Civil Liberties & Motorists	Jeff Hodges	5,502	0.90	−1.20
Independent	Frank Jordan	4,008	0.65	+0.65
Independent	John Dobinson	3,461	0.56	+0.56
Independent	Ben Gorringe	2,270	0.37	+0.37
Independent	Jarrod Wirth	2,065	0.34	−0.16
Total formal votes		613,536		
Informal votes		16,425		
Turnout		629,961		
Two-party-preferred result
Liberal National	Adrian Schrinner	306,905	56.32	−2.99
Labor	Pat Condren	237,988	43.68	+2.99
Liberal National hold		Swing	−2.99	

=== Bulloo ===
2020 Queensland mayoral elections: Bulloo
Party	Candidate	Votes	%	±%
Independent	John (Tractor) Ferguson	115	65.34	
Independent	Daryl (Byrnesy) Byrne	54	30.68	
Independent	Brett Williams	7	3.98	
Turnout		177	88.06	
Two-candidate-preferred result
Independent	John (Tractor) Ferguson	115	67.25	
Independent	Daryl (Byrnesy) Byrne	56	32.75	
Independent hold		Swing		

=== Bundaberg ===
2020 Queensland mayoral elections: Bundaberg
Party	Candidate	Votes	%	±%
Independent	Jack Dempsey	35,552	65.16	
Independent	Helen Blackburn	17,275	31.66	
Independent	Kirt Anthony	1,733	3.18	
Turnout		56,127	81.47	
Two-candidate-preferred result
Independent	Jack Dempsey	35,853	67.00	
Independent	Helen Blackburn	17,659	33.00	
Independent hold		Swing		

=== Burdekin ===
2020 Queensland mayoral elections: Burdekin
Party	Candidate	Votes	%	±%
Independent	Lyn McLaughlan	4,888	48.92	
Independent	Pierina Dalle Cort	3,229	32.32	
Independent	Larry Bradford	1,875	18.77	
Turnout		10,157	84.63	
Two-candidate-preferred result
Independent	Lyn McLaughlan	5,145	58.06	
Independent	Pierina Dalle Cort	3,717	41.94	
Independent hold		Swing		

=== Burke ===
2020 Queensland mayoral elections: Burke
Party	Candidate	Votes	%	±%
Independent	Ernest Camp	unopposed		
Independent hold		Swing		

=== Cairns ===
2020 Queensland mayoral elections: Cairns
Party	Candidate	Votes	%	±%
Cairns Unity	Bob Manning	47,171	66.97	
Independent	Georgia Babatsikos	8,161	11.59	
Independent LNP	Ian Lydiard	7,837	11.13	
Cairns N.Q.S.A. Team	Jen Sackley	7,266	10.32	
Turnout		73,850	70.56	
Two-candidate-preferred result
Cairns Unity	Bob Manning	49,048	81.25	
Independent	Georgia Babatsikos	11,320	18.75	
Cairns Unity hold		Swing		

=== Carpentaria ===
2020 Queensland mayoral elections: Carpentaria
Party	Candidate	Votes	%	±%
Independent	Jack Bawden	533	70.78	
Independent	Fred Pascoe	220	29.22	
Turnout		756	71.52	
Independent hold		Swing		

=== Gold Coast ===
2020 Queensland mayoral elections: Gold Coast
Party	Candidate	Votes	%	±%
Independent	Tom Tate	151,579	55.73	−8.13
Independent	Mona Hecke	67,117	24.68	+24.68
Independent	Brett Lambert	17,083	6.28	+3.22
Independent	Virginia Freebody	15,260	5.61	+5.61
Independent	Kris Bourban	9,115	3.35	+3.35
Independent	Gary Pead	6,843	2.52	+2.52
Civil Liberties & Motorists	Suphakan Somsriruen	2,545	0.94	+0.94
Independent	Derek Rosborough	2,429	0.89	+0.89
Turnout		287,531	74.12	
Two-candidate-preferred result
Independent	Tom Tate	154,054	66.93	−6.21
Independent	Mona Hecke	76,126	33.07	+33.07
Independent hold		Swing	−6.21	

=== Ipswich ===
2020 Queensland mayoral elections: Ipswich
Party	Candidate	Votes	%	±%
Independent LNP	Teresa Harding	40,026	41.11	+41.11
Independent	David Martin	23,037	23.66	+23.66
Greens	Pat Walsh	14,411	14.80	+8.07
Independent Labor	Mark Williams	7,035	7.23	+7.23
Independent	Chris Smith	6,102	6.27	+6.27
Independent Labor	Ursula Monsiegneur	5,276	5.42	+5.42
Independent	Karakan Kochardy	1,466	1.51	+1.51
Turnout		104,879	78.64	
Two-candidate-preferred result
Independent LNP	Teresa Harding	42,542	62.98	+62.98
Independent	David Martin	25,003	37.02	+37.02
Independent LNP gain from Independent Labor		Swing	N/A	

- Changes compared with 2017 Ipswich mayoral by-election

=== Townsville ===
2020 Queensland mayoral elections: Townsville
Party	Candidate	Votes	%	±%
Team Jenny Hill	Jenny Hill	46,911	50.64	−8.87
Independent	Sam Cox	25,076	27.07	+27.07
It's Time for Townsville	Greg Dowling	16,155	17.44	+17.44
NQ State Alliance	Chris Eastaughffe	4,498	4.86	+4.86
Turnout		95,509	74.27	−5.78
Two-candidate-preferred result
Team Jenny Hill	Jenny Hill	49,255	61.53	−1.16
Independent	Sam Cox	30,791	38.47	+38.47
Team Jenny Hill hold		Swing	−1.16	

== Summary ==
Mayors listed in italics did not re-contest their position.

Council	Before		Result after preference distribution			
Council	Mayor	Party	Party	Candidate	%	Result
Aurukun	Derek Walpo	Independent	Independent	Keri Tamwoy	68.78	Independent gain
Aurukun	Derek Walpo	Independent	Independent	Barbara Bandicootcha	31.22	Independent gain
Balonne	Richard Marsh	Independent	Independent	Samantha O'Toole	55.56	Independent gain
Balonne	Richard Marsh	Independent	Independent	Richard Marsh	44.44	Independent gain
Banana	Neville Ferrier	Independent	Independent	Neville Ferrier	N/A	Independent hold
Banana	Neville Ferrier	Independent	Elected unopposed			Independent hold
Barcaldine	Rob Chandler	Independent	Independent	Sean Dillon	53.94	Independent gain
Barcaldine	Rob Chandler	Independent	Independent	Rob Chandler	46.04	Independent gain
Barcoo	Bruce Scott	Independent	Independent	Sally O'Neil	60.23	Independent gain
Barcoo	Bruce Scott	Independent	Independent	Shane Buckley	39.77	Independent gain
Blackall-Tambo	Andrew Martin	Independent	Independent	Andrew Martin	64.92	Independent hold
Blackall-Tambo	Andrew Martin	Independent	Independent	Peter Skewes	35.08	Independent hold
Boulia	Eric Britton	Independent	Independent	Eric Britton	N/A	Independent hold
Boulia	Eric Britton	Independent	Elected unopposed			Independent hold
Brisbane	Adrian Schrinner	Liberal National	LNP	Adrian Schrinner	56.30	Liberal National hold
Brisbane	Adrian Schrinner	Liberal National	Labor	Pat Condren	43.70	Liberal National hold
Bulloo	John Ferguson	Independent	Independent	John Ferguson	67.25	Independent hold
Bulloo	John Ferguson	Independent	Independent	Daryl Byrne	32.75	Independent hold
Bundaberg	Jack Dempsey	Independent	Independent	Jack Dempsey	67.00	Independent hold
Bundaberg	Jack Dempsey	Independent	Independent	Helen Blackburn	33.00	Independent hold
Burdekin	Lyn McLaughlan	Independent	Independent	Lyn McLaughlan	58.06	Independent hold
Burdekin	Lyn McLaughlan	Independent	Independent	Pierina Dalle Cort	41.94	Independent hold
Burke	Ernest Camp	Independent	Independent	Ernest Camp	N/A	Independent hold
Burke	Ernest Camp	Independent	Elected unopposed			Independent hold
Cairns	Bob Manning	Cairns Unity	Cairns Unity	Bob Manning	81.25	Cairns Unity hold
Cairns	Bob Manning	Cairns Unity	Independent	Georgia Babatsikos	18.75	Cairns Unity hold
Carpentaria	Lyall Bawden	Independent	Independent	Lyall Bawden	70.78	Independent hold
Carpentaria	Lyall Bawden	Independent	Independent	Fred Pascoe	29.22	Independent hold
Cassowary Coast	John Kremastos	Independent	Independent	Mark Nolan	51.22	Independent gain
Cassowary Coast	John Kremastos	Independent	Independent	Bryce Macdonald	48.78	Independent gain
Central Highlands	Kerry Hayes	Independent	Independent	Kerry Hayes	N/A	Independent hold
Central Highlands	Kerry Hayes	Independent	Elected unopposed			Independent hold
Charters Towers	Liz Schmidt	Independent	Independent	Frank Beveridge	52.51	Independent gain
Charters Towers	Liz Schmidt	Independent	Independent	Liz Schmidt	47.49	Independent gain
Cherbourg	Murray Arnold	Independent	Independent	Elvie Sandow	56.91	Independent gain
Cherbourg	Murray Arnold	Independent	Independent	Max Conlon	43.09	Independent gain
Cloncurry	Gregory Campbell	Independent	Independent	Gregory Campbell	N/A	Independent hold
Cloncurry	Gregory Campbell	Independent	Elected unopposed			Independent hold
Cook	Peter Scott	Independent	Independent	Peter Scott	54.16	Independent hold
Cook	Peter Scott	Independent	Independent	Peter Skipworth	45.84	Independent hold
Croydon	Trevor Pickering	Independent	Independent	Trevor Pickering	61.54	Independent hold
Croydon	Trevor Pickering	Independent	Independent	Patrick Wheeler	38.46	Independent hold
Diamantina	Geoffrey Morton	Independent	Independent	Robert Martin Dare	65.26	Independent gain
Diamantina	Geoffrey Morton	Independent	Independent	Michael Dunne	34.74	Independent gain
Doomadgee	Edric Walden	Independent	Independent	Jason Neds	50.61	Independent gain
Doomadgee	Edric Walden	Independent	Independent	Frederick Charles O'Keefe	49.39	Independent gain
Douglas	Julia Leu	Independent	Ind. LNP	Michael John Kerr	54.95	Ind. Liberal National gain
Douglas	Julia Leu	Independent	Independent	Julia Leu	45.05	Ind. Liberal National gain
Etheridge	Warren Devlin	Independent	Independent	Barry Hughes	62.29	Independent gain
Etheridge	Warren Devlin	Independent	Independent	Warren Devlin	37.71	Independent gain
Flinders	Jane McNamara	Independent	Independent	Jane McNamara	53.92	Independent hold
Flinders	Jane McNamara	Independent	Independent	Graham Sealy	46.08	Independent hold
Fraser Coast	Chris Loft	Independent	Independent	George Seymour	77.77	Independent gain
Fraser Coast	Chris Loft	Independent	Independent	Jannean Dean	22.23	Independent gain
Gladstone	Matt Burnett	Independent	Independent	Matt Burnett	73.46	Independent hold
Gladstone	Matt Burnett	Independent	Independent	Michael Fearns	26.54	Independent hold
Gold Coast	Tom Tate	Ind. Liberal National	Ind. LNP	Tom Tate	66.93	Ind. Liberal National hold
Gold Coast	Tom Tate	Ind. Liberal National	Independent	Mona Hecke	33.07	Ind. Liberal National hold
Goondiwindi	Graeme Scheu	Independent	Ind. LNP	Lawrence Springborg	N/A	Ind. Liberal National gain
Goondiwindi	Graeme Scheu	Independent	Elected unopposed			Ind. Liberal National gain
Gympie	Mick Curran	Independent	Independent	Glen Hartwig	60.54	Independent gain
Gympie	Mick Curran	Independent	Independent	Mick Curran	39.46	Independent gain
Hinchinbrook	Ramon Jayo	Independent	Independent	Ramon Jayo	N/A	Independent hold
Hinchinbrook	Ramon Jayo	Independent	Elected unopposed			Independent hold
Hope Vale	Gregory McLean	Independent	Independent	Jason Woibo	67.09	Independent gain
Hope Vale	Gregory McLean	Independent	Independent	Wilfred Gordon	32.91	Independent gain
Ipswich	Greg Chemello (Note: The Queensland Government dissolved the Ipswich City Council on the 22 August 2018 after a series of corruption scandals. Greg Chemello was then appointed as a temporary administrator to serve for the rest of his predecessors' term.)	Independent	Ind. LNP	Teresa Harding	62.98	Ind. Liberal National gain
Ipswich	Greg Chemello	Independent	Ind. Labor	David Martin	37.02	Ind. Liberal National gain
Isaac	Anne Baker	Independent	Independent	Anne Baker	N/A	Independent hold
Isaac	Anne Baker	Independent	Elected unopposed			Independent hold
Kowanyama	Michael Yam	Independent	Independent	Robbie Sands	81.03	Independent gain
Kowanyama	Michael Yam	Independent	Independent	Michael Yam	18.97	Independent gain
Livingstone	Bill Ludwig	Independent	Independent	Andy Ireland	53.49	Independent gain
Livingstone	Bill Ludwig	Independent	Independent	Bill Ludwig	46.51	Independent gain
Lockhart River	Wayne William Butcher	Independent	Independent	Wayne William Butcher	62.87	Independent hold
Lockhart River	Wayne William Butcher	Independent	Independent	Rodney Accoom	37.13	Independent hold
Lockyer Valley	Tanya Milligan	Independent	Independent	Tanya Milligan	N/A	Independent hold
Lockyer Valley	Tanya Milligan	Independent	Elected unopposed			Independent hold
Logan	Cherie Dalley (acting) (Note: The elected Mayor, Luke Smith, was suspended by the Queensland Government on 22 May 2018 as part of integrity reforms.)	Independent Labor	Independent	Darren Power	64.04	Independent gain
Logan	Cherie Dalley (acting)	Independent Labor	Independent	Brett Raguse	35.96	Independent gain
Longreach	Ed Warren	Independent	Independent	Tony Rayner	55.48	Independent gain
Longreach	Ed Warren	Independent	Independent	Brecken Curtis	44.52	Independent gain
Mackay	Greg Williamson Alliance	Greg Williamson Alliance	Williamson Alliance	Greg Williamson	N/A	Greg Williamson Alliance hold
Mackay	Greg Williamson Alliance	Greg Williamson Alliance	Elected unopposed			Greg Williamson Alliance hold
Mapoon	Aileen Addo	Independent	Independent	Aileen Addo	76.09	Independent hold
Mapoon	Aileen Addo	Independent	Independent	Pauline Smith	23.91	Independent hold
Maranoa	Tyson Golder	Unity Maranoa	Unity Maranoa	Tyson Golder	72.35	Unity Maranoa hold
Maranoa	Tyson Golder	Unity Maranoa	Ind. KAP	Rob Loughnan	27.65	Unity Maranoa hold
Mareeba	Tom Gilmore	Independent	Independent	Angela Toppin	52.32	Independent gain
Mareeba	Tom Gilmore	Independent	Our Team	Nipper Brown	47.68	Independent gain
McKinlay	Belinda Murphy	Independent	Independent	Philip Curr	52.88	Independent gain
McKinlay	Belinda Murphy	Independent	Independent	Nyasa Currin	47.12	Independent gain
Moreton Bay	Allan Sutherland	Independent	Independent	Peter Flannery	52.80	Independent gain
Moreton Bay	Allan Sutherland	Independent	Independent	Chris Thompson	47.20	Independent gain
Mornington	Bradley Wilson	Independent	Independent	Kyle Yanner	59.95	Independent gain
Mornington	Bradley Wilson	Independent	Independent	Richard Sewter	40.05	Independent gain
Mount Isa	Joyce McCulloch	Progress Mount Isa	MICT	Danielle Slade	52.25	Mount Isa Community Team gain
Mount Isa	Joyce McCulloch	Progress Mount Isa	Progress	Joyce McCulloch	47.75	Mount Isa Community Team gain
Murweh	Anne Liston	Independent	Independent	Shaun Radnedge	73.69	Independent gain
Murweh	Anne Liston	Independent	Independent	Anne Liston	26.31	Independent gain
Napranum	Rex Burke	Independent	Independent	Janita Motton	50.58	Independent gain
Napranum	Rex Burke	Independent	Independent	Roy Chevathen	49.42	Independent gain
Noosa	Tony Wellington	Independent	Independent	Clare Stewart	50.60	Independent gain
Noosa	Tony Wellington	Independent	Independent	Tony Wellington	49.40	Independent gain
North Burnett	Rachel Chambers	Independent	Independent	Rachel Chambers	N/A	Independent hold
North Burnett	Rachel Chambers	Independent	Elected unopposed			Independent hold
Northern Peninsula	Eddie Newman	Independent	Independent	Patricia Yusia	53.26	Independent gain
Northern Peninsula	Eddie Newman	Independent	Independent	Jeffrey Aniba	46.74	Independent gain
Palm Island	Alfred Lacey	Independent	Independent	Mislam Sam	55.61	Independent gain
Palm Island	Alfred Lacey	Independent	Independent	Lex Wotton	44.39	Independent gain
Paroo	Eric Godfrey	Independent	Independent	Suzette Beresford	51.17	Independent gain
Paroo	Eric Godfrey	Independent	Independent	William Carr	48.83	Independent gain
Pormpuraaw	Ralph Kendall	Independent	Independent	Richard Tarpencha	55.12	Independent gain
Pormpuraaw	Ralph Kendall	Independent	Independent	Ralph Kendall	44.88	Independent gain
Quilpie	Stuart Mackenzie	Independent	Independent	Stuart Mackenzie	N/A	Independent hold
Quilpie	Stuart Mackenzie	Independent	Elected unopposed			Independent hold
Redland	Karen Williams	Ind. Liberal National	Ind. LNP	Karen Williams	50.89	Ind. Liberal National hold
Redland	Karen Williams	Ind. Liberal National	Independent	Claire Richardson	49.11	Ind. Liberal National hold
Richmond	John Wharton	Independent	Independent	John Wharton	N/A	Independent hold
Richmond	John Wharton	Independent	Elected unopposed			Independent hold
Rockhampton	Margaret Strelow	Independent	Independent	Margaret Strelow	68.85	Independent hold
Rockhampton	Margaret Strelow	Independent	Independent	Chris Hooper	31.15	Independent hold
Scenic Rim	Greg Christiensen	Ind. Liberal National	Ind. LNP	Greg Christensen	52.02	Ind. Liberal National hold
Scenic Rim	Greg Christiensen	Ind. Liberal National	Independent	Tom Sharp	47.98	Ind. Liberal National hold
Somerset	Graeme Lehmann	Independent	Independent	Graeme Lehmann	N/A	Independent hold
Somerset	Graeme Lehmann	Independent	Elected unopposed			Independent hold
South Burnett	Keith Campbell	Independent	Independent	Brett Otto	52.52	Independent gain
South Burnett	Keith Campbell	Independent	Independent	Keith Campbell	47.48	Independent gain
Southern Downs	Tracy Dobie	Independent	Independent	Vic Pennisi	55.85	Independent gain
Southern Downs	Tracy Dobie	Independent	Independent	Tracy Dobie	44.15	Independent gain
Sunshine Coast	Mark Jamieson	Independent	Independent	Mark Jamieson	57.73	Independent hold
Sunshine Coast	Mark Jamieson	Independent	Independent	Chris Thompson	42.27	Independent hold
Tablelands	Joe Paronella	Independent	Independent	Rod Marti	59.45	Independent hold
Tablelands	Joe Paronella	Independent	Independent	Katrina Mellick	40.55	Independent hold
Toowoomba	Paul Antonio	Independent	Independent	Paul Antonio	77.88	Independent hold
Toowoomba	Paul Antonio	Independent	Independent	Christopher Meibush	22.12	Independent hold
Torres	Vonda Malone	Independent	Independent	Vonda Malone	50.88	Independent hold
Torres	Vonda Malone	Independent	Independent	Yen Loban	49.12	Independent hold
Torres Strait Islands	Fred Gela	Independent	Independent	Phillemon Mosby	63.91	Independent gain
Torres Strait Islands	Fred Gela	Independent	Independent	Fred Gela	36.09	Independent gain
Townsville	Jenny Hill	Team Jenny Hill	Team Hill	Jenny Hill	61.53	Team Jenny Hill hold
Townsville	Jenny Hill	Team Jenny Hill	Independent	Sam Cox	38.47	Team Jenny Hill hold
Western Downs	Paul McVeigh	Independent	Independent	Paul McVeigh	73.46	Independent hold
Western Downs	Paul McVeigh	Independent	Independent	Glenn Strandquist	26.54	Independent hold
Whistunday	Andrew Willcox	Independent	Independent	Andrew Willcox	N/A	Independent hold
Whistunday	Andrew Willcox	Independent	Elected unopposed			Independent hold
Winton	Graham Lenton	Independent	Independent	Gavin Baskett	63.35	Independent gain
Winton	Graham Lenton	Independent	Independent	Travis Habour	36.65	Independent gain
Woorabinda	Cheyne Wilkie	Independent	Team Weazel	Josh Weazel	69.46	Team Josh Weazel gain
Woorabinda	Cheyne Wilkie	Independent	Independent	Leslie Murgha	30.54	Team Josh Weazel gain
Wujal Wujal	Desmond Tayley	Independent	Independent	Bradley Creek	52.87	Independent gain
Wujal Wujal	Desmond Tayley	Independent	Independent	Desmond Tayley	47.13	Independent gain
Yarrabah	Ross Andrews	Independent	Independent	Ross Andrews	56.24	Independent hold
Yarrabah	Ross Andrews	Independent	Independent	Brent Pearson	43.76	Independent hold
