= 1995 Cairns City Council election =

- 11 March 1995
- Turnout
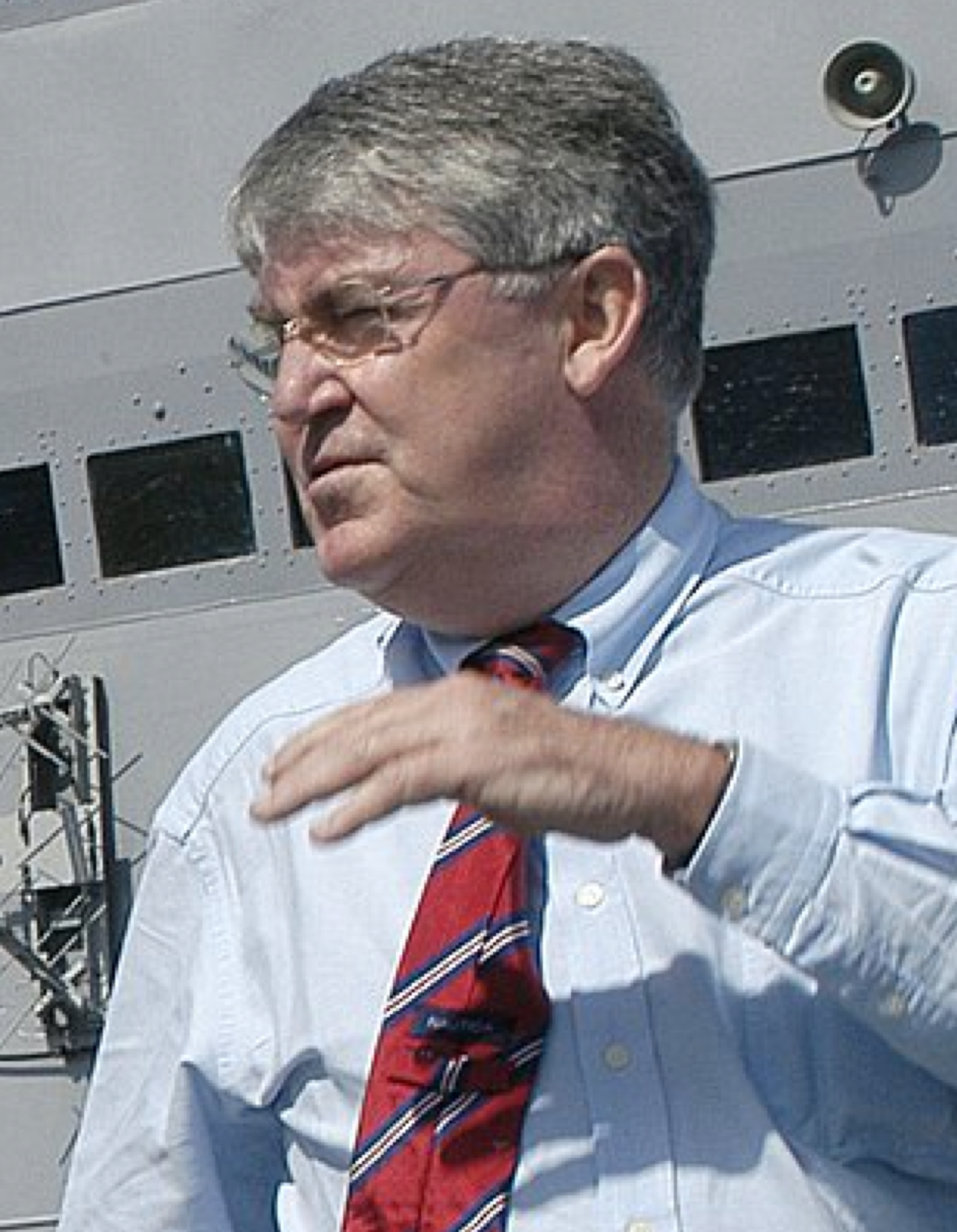
	First party	Second party
	IND
Candidate	Tom Pyne	Kevin Byrne
Party	Ind. Labor	Independent
Mayor before election
Kevin Byrne
Independent
Subsequent Mayor
Tom Pyne
Ind. Labor

The 1995 Cairns City Council election was held on 11 March 1995 to elect a mayor and councillors to the City of Cairns, a local government area (LGA) of Queensland, Australia.

The election was one of three held in 1995 following several amalgamations, which included the Shire of Mulgrave being absorbed into Cairns City.

Outgoing Mulgrave chairman Tom Pyne easily defeated incumbent Cairns mayor Kevin Byrne in the mayoral election.

== Background ==
Mulgrave, formed in 1879, surrounded the City of Cairns in the Far North, and was administered from Cairns. It covered an area of 1,718.3 square kilometres (663.4 sq mi), and by the time of the 1991 census, 88% of it population resided within Cairns's metropolitan area.

The Commission recommended that the shire be merged into Cairns City, which happened when the Local Government (Cairns, Douglas, Mareeba and Mulgrave) Regulation 1994 was gazetted on 16 December 1994.
