= Nungabana =

Australian Mullanburra elder

Nungabana, also known as George Gilbert Davis (died 2002), was the last elder of the Mullanburra people of Queensland, Australia. Coauthor of 'Mullanburra: People of the Mulgrave River', George made an outstanding contribution to the survival and enhancement of tropical rainforest Aboriginal culture and heritage.

Born into the Malanbarra-Yidiny clan group, George grew up in the traditional way under the guidance of his grandfather, and went on to spend the next 49 years cutting timber in north Queensland’s rainforests. After retiring in Atherton, he dedicated his time to his cultural heritage as both an artist and educator. Widely respected in the Aboriginal community for his skill in making traditional artefacts such as shields, swords, dilly bags and boomerangs, George is also widely respected in the wider community as a true gentleman and a valued elder of the Atherton community. George was committed to community education and visited local schools and other centres often to talk about his culture.

George was the last elder who held the knowledge of the Mullanburra people, and with his passing in 2002, much knowledge was lost. Some photos were taken by historian Duncan Ray who, for many years, documented George's skills for the Eacham Historical Society.

George wanted to pass his traditional knowledge on to younger people, and actively did so. Duncan Ray is a non-Indigenous historian and artist who recorded the skills and techniques George used to make the tribes' varied traditional swords and shields. George and Duncan worked together creating several swords and shields, and were both members of the Tableland Reconciliation Group.

George passed down his knowledge to Lorraine Lewis and her close family, who grew up with him and Ngadjon Jii Elder Tom Gertz, Sr.
