= 2024 Cairns Regional Council election =

- 16 March 2024
- Mayor
	First party	Second party	Third party
	EDEN	UNI	IND
Candidate	Amy Eden	Terry James	Paul Taylor
Party	Team Eden	Cairns Unity	Independent
Popular vote	25,782	20,187	19,532
Percentage	30.70%	24.04%	23.26%
Swing	▲30.70	▼42.93	▲23.26
TCP	56.64%	43.36%
TCP swing	▲56.64%	▼37.89
Mayor before election
Terry James
Cairns Unity
Subsequent Mayor
Amy Eden
Team Eden
- Councillors
- All 10 members on the Regional Council (including the mayor); 6 seats needed for a majority
Party	Leader	Vote %	Seats	+/–
Cairns Unity	Terry James		3	−2
Independent	N/A		3	+1
Team Eden	Amy Eden		1	0
Independent LNP	N/A		1	+1
Ind. Socialist Alliance	Rob Pyne		1	0
This lists parties that won seats. See the complete results below.

The 2024 Cairns Regional Council election was held on 16 March 2024 to elect a mayor and nine councillors to the Cairns Region. The election was held as part of the statewide local elections in Queensland, Australia.

The Cairns Unity Team, which had held a majority on council since 2012, was defeated. Incumbent mayor Terry James was defeated by first-term councillor Amy Eden, who became the second woman to hold the role, after Val Schier.

== Background ==
At the 2020 election, Unity won a third consecutive election with six councillors elected. Incumbent mayor Bob Manning was re-elected with 81.25% of the vote after preferences.

Division 9 councillor Brett Olds, who was elected as Independent LNP, resigned from the Liberal National Party in September 2021 in opposition to the federal Morrison government's COVID-19 vaccination restrictions.

On 6 December 2022, Manning announced his intention not to seek re-election at the end of his third term. Deputy mayor Terry James confirmed his intention to run and lead Unity.

In July 2023, Division 5 councillor Amy Eden defected from Unity to form Team Eden, announcing her decision to contest the mayoralty.

Bob Manning announced his resignation, effective immediately, on 17 November 2023. Terry James was appointed as his replacement until the 2024 election, while Jeremy Neal (also a Unity member) was appointed to replace James in Division 4.

== Campaign ==
During the campaign, James expressed support for the law and order policies of Katter's Australian Party, although stated that Cairns Unity "do[es]n't endorse any party" at a state level.

Team Eden stated their priorities were creating a "renewed" Cairns with a "commitment to transparency, accountability, and engagement". In February 2024, During the campaign, Eden was accused of plagiarising a Facebook post from Toowoomba councillor Rebecca Vonhoff. She later admitted to using passages of Vonhoff's post, and apologised.

In November 2023, ABC News reported that Division 4 candidate Shane Cuthbert, a former criminal and member of the unregistered Democratic Party of Queensland, had appeared in multiple online videos with a Nazi flag in 2019. Cuthbert stated that it was "not a good look" and he had filmed the videos in a "shop that sold a bunch of old, cool stuff," and thought "the background of the store and the colours and things like that [looked cool]".

== Candidates ==
A total of 39 candidates ran for election. Incumbents are shown in bold text.

Ward	Held by	Cairns Unity	Team Eden	Community First	Independents	Others
**Mayor**	Cairns Unity	**Terry James**	Amy Eden	Denis Walls	Warren Binda; John Kel; Leah Potter; Paul Taylor	
**Division 1**	Cairns Unity	**Brett Moller**				
**Division 2**	Ind. Socialist Alliance	Nikki Giumelli	Kesa Strieby	Patricia Courtenay	John Schilling	Steve Lippingwell (Ind. ALP); Matthew Tickner (Ind. LNP)
**Division 3**	Independent	Heidi Healy		Marisa Seden	**Cathy Zeiger**	
**Division 4**	Cairns Unity	**Jeremy Neal**	Trevor Tim		Cate Mahoney	Shane Cuthbert (Ind. Dem)
**Division 5**	Team Eden	Nathan Lee Long	Emma Gelling		James Coll; Birgit Ariane Machnitzke	Rob Pyne (Ind. SA)
**Division 6**	Cairns Unity	**Kristy Vallely**	Shane Trimby	Nicole Sleeman	Alan Benn	
**Division 7**	Cairns Unity	Matthew Calanna	Ian Moller-Nielsen	Renee Lees	Anna Middleton	
**Division 8**	Cairns Unity	**Rhonda Coghlan**	Jo Piggott	Phillip Musumeci		Hannah Boon (Ind. LNP)
**Division 9**	Independent			Carine Visschers	**Brett Olds**	

=== Cairns Unity ===
Cairns Unity announced its candidates on 1 September 2023. Division 7 councillor Max O'Halloran chose not to seek re-election.

=== Team Eden ===
Team Eden announced candidates for six out of nine wards, with Emma Gelling contesting in Division 5, held by Amy Eden.

Restaurateur Sam Byrd was Team Eden's candidate for Division 7 until August 2023, when he withdrew citing conflict with commitments in his private life.

=== Community First ===
Community First was formed in November 2023 by members of the Greens and Socialist Alliance. The group stated they supported measures to end "conflicts of interest and dodgy deals" on council.

The group was led by mayoral candidate Denis Wall, a Greens member and former university teacher.

=== Others ===
Paul Taylor, a former Queensland deputy police commissioner who resigned after referring to his friend as a "vagina whisperer" at a policing conference in 2022, contested the mayoralty as an independent candidate.

Division 2 councillor Rob Pyne, who joined Socialist Alliance following the 2020 election, initially planned to retire but later chose to contest Division 5.

== Results ==
=== Mayor ===
2024 Queensland mayoral elections: Cairns
Party	Candidate	Votes	%	±%
Team Eden	Amy Eden	25,782	30.70	+30.70
Cairns Unity	Terry James	20,187	24.04	−42.93
Independent	Paul Taylor	19,532	23.26	+23.26
Community First	Denis Walls	10,745	12.79	+12.79
Independent	John Kel	3,854	4.59	+4.59
Independent	Leah Potter	2,747	3.27	+3.27
Independent	Warren Binda	1,139	1.36	+1.36
Turnout		88,650	75.39	+4.83
Two-candidate-preferred result
Team Eden	Amy Eden	30,364	56.64	+56.64
Cairns Unity	Terry James	23,242	43.36	−37.89
Team Eden gain from Cairns Unity		Swing	N/A	

=== Councillors ===
2024 Queensland local elections: Cairns
Party	Votes	%	Swing	Seats	Change
Cairns Unity				3	▼2
Independent				3	▲1
Team Eden				1	Steady
Independent LNP				1	▲1
Independent Socialist Alliance				1	Steady
Community First				0	Steady
Independent Labor				0	Steady
Independent Democratic				0	Steady

=== Division 1 ===
2024 Queensland local elections: Division 1
Party	Candidate	Votes	%	±%
Cairns Unity	Brett Moller	unopposed		
Cairns Unity hold		Swing		

=== Division 2 ===
2024 Queensland local elections: Division 2
Party	Candidate	Votes	%	±%
Independent LNP	Matthew Tickner	3,137	32.44	
Independent	John Schilling	1,702	17.60	
Cairns Unity	Nikki Giumelli	1,541	15.94	
Independent Labor	Steve Lippingwell	1,530	15.82	
Team Eden	Kesa Strieby	1,160	12.00	
Community First	Patricia Courtenay	600	6.20	
Turnout		10,212	73.48	
Two-candidate-preferred result
Independent LNP gain from Ind. Socialist Alliance		Swing		

- Incumbent councillor Rob Pyne (Ind. Socialist, later Ind. Socialist Alliance) contested Division 5.

=== Division 3 ===
2024 Queensland local elections: Division 3
Party	Candidate	Votes	%	±%
Independent	Cathy Zeiger	6,467	70.04	
Cairns Unity	Heidi Healy	1,604	17.37	
Community First	Marisa Seden	1,162	12.59	
Turnout		9,593	74.80	
Independent hold		Swing		

=== Division 4 ===
2024 Queensland local elections: Division 4
Party	Candidate	Votes	%	±%
Cairns Unity	Jeremy Neal	2,750	32.28	
Team Eden	Trevor Tim	2,591	30.41	
Independent	Cate Mahoney	586	19.73	
Independent Democratic	Shane Cuthbert	545	18.35	
Turnout		8,949	74.18	
Two-candidate-preferred result
Team Eden gain from Cairns Unity		Swing		

=== Division 5 ===
2024 Queensland local elections: Division 5
Party	Candidate	Votes	%	±%
Ind. Socialist Alliance	Rob Pyne	2,296	30.01	
Team Eden	Emma Gelling	1,882	24.59	
Cairns Unity	Nathan Lee Long	1,851	24.19	
Independent	Birgit Ariane Machnitzke	948	12.39	
Independent	James Coll	675	8.82	
Turnout		8,097	63.93	
Two-candidate-preferred result
Ind. Socialist Alliance gain from Team Eden		Swing		

- Incumbent councillor Amy Eden (Independent, later Team Eden) ran for mayor and therefore did not recontest.

=== Division 6 ===
2024 Queensland local elections: Division 6
Party	Candidate	Votes	%	±%
Cairns Unity	Kristy Vallely	3,984	39.52	
Team Eden	Shane Trimby	2,609	25.88	
Community First	Nicole Sleeman	1,981	19.65	
Independent	Alan Benn	1,506	14.94	
Turnout		10,465	82.25	
Two-candidate-preferred result
Cairns Unity hold		Swing		

=== Division 7 ===
2024 Queensland local elections: Division 7
Party	Candidate	Votes	%	±%
Independent	Anna Middleton	2,554	29.08	
Cairns Unity	Matthew Calanna	2,395	27.27	
Community First	Renee Lees	2,130	24.25	
Team Eden	Ian Moller-Nielsen	1,703	19.39	
Turnout		9,273	73.82	
Two-candidate-preferred result
Independent gain from Cairns Unity		Swing		

=== Division 8 ===
2024 Queensland local elections: Division 8
Party	Candidate	Votes	%	±%
Cairns Unity	Rhonda Coghlan	3,155	33.95	
Team Eden	Jo Piggott	2,532	27.25	
Community First	Phillip Musumeci	1,965	21.95	
Independent LNP	Hannah Boon	1,640	17.65	
Turnout		9,942	71.13	
Two-candidate-preferred result
Cairns Unity hold		Swing		

=== Division 9 ===
2024 Queensland local elections: Division 9
Party	Candidate	Votes	%	±%
Independent	Brett Olds	8,029	76.80	
Community First	Carine Visschers	2,425	23.20	
Turnout		10,822	79.45	
Independent hold		Swing		

- Incumbent councillor Brett Olds was elected as Independent LNP but left the LNP in September 2021.
