= Tom Pyne =

Australian politician

Tom Pyne AO

Mayor of Cairns
- In office 22 March 1995 – 2000
- Preceded by: Kevin Byrne
- Succeeded by: Kevin Byrne

Personal details
- Born: Thomas Alfred Pyne; 31 January 1935 Babinda, Queensland
- Died: 30 October 2011 (aged 76) Babinda, Queensland
- Party: Labor Party

Thomas Alfred Pyne AO (31 January 1935 – 30 October 2011) was an Australian politician. He was the shire chairman of the Shire of Mulgrave from 1979 to 1995, and following the amalgamation of Mulgrave with the City of Cairns, was Mayor of Cairns from 1995 to 2000. His son, Rob Pyne, was a Cairns City Councillor and State Member (Labor and Independent) for Cairns in the Legislative Assembly of Queensland.

== Professional life and party politics ==
Pyne was born in Babinda, the youngest of five children. He was educated at the McDonnell's Creek, Bellenden Ker and Hambledon State Schools, and lived for a period at Deeral before moving to Edmonton. He married Marion McKinnon in 1955; they had two children. He worked as a wood machinist with Cairns furniture manufacturer A. H. Kent, and later for Queensland Railways, the Department of Works, and Advanx Tyre and Motor Services. He subsequently opened his own business, Tin-Sang and Co, at Edmonton. Pyne also served in the Royal Queensland Regiment Reserve, attaining the rank of sergeant.

Pyne joined the Labor Party at 18, and held a range of roles in the party, including local branch president and secretary, campaign director for several MPs, including former Treasurer Keith De Lacy, ultimately being awarded life membership of the party in 1985.

== Local government ==
Pyne was elected as a Shire of Mulgrave councillor in 1961, and served continuously until the shire was merged into the City of Cairns in 1995. He was elected deputy shire chairman in 1976, and in 1979, following the retirement of former chairman Ken Alley, was elected shire chairman. He served as shire chairman for 16 years until the shire's dissolution.

He was a prominent member of the Local Government Association of Queensland, becoming a member of the Local Government Executive in 1979, being re-appointed in 1985, 1988 and 1991, and later serving as the president of the LGAQ from 1997 to 2000. Pyne was an opponent of proposed forced council mergers in the early 1990s, including that of Mulgrave with neighboring Cairns, and headed a group of North Queensland councils opposed to the amalgamations. The campaign was unsuccessful, and the Shire of Mulgrave was merged into the City of Cairns in 1995.

Pyne contested the first mayoral election for the new enlarged City of Cairns in 1995, and easily defeated incumbent Cairns mayor Kevin Byrne. His term as mayor included overseeing the transition to the new council, new council headquarters, and the Esplanade Lagoon on the Cairns foreshore. He retired in 2000, having never lost an election, and having served as shire chairman or mayor for 21 consecutive years. He was succeeded as Mayor of Cairns by his predecessor, Kevin Byrne.

== Honours ==
On Australia Day in 2000, it was announced that Tom Pyne had been appointed as an Officer of the Order of Australia. Pyne was also awarded the Centenary Medal in 2001.

Tom Pyne died in the township of Babinda, south of Cairns, Queensland, on 30 October 2011.
