= Vincent Mundraby =

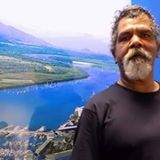
- Mundraby in 2016
- Born: 29 January 1967; Atherton, Queensland
- Died: 17 June 2017 (aged 50); Kowanyama, Queensland
- Resting place: Gordonvale, Queensland
- Citizenship: Australian
- Education: Gordonvale High School, School of the Air, Cairns TAFE, Yidinji Elders
- Known for: Promoting and advocating Mandingalbay Yidinji people's land ownership & the rights of his fellow First Peoples to themselves manage their own World Heritage listed wet tropical forests

Vincent Mark Hilton Mundraby (29 January 1967 – 17 June 2017) was a Far North Queensland Aboriginal Australian Yidinji rights activist.

== Descent ==
Born Vincent Mark Hilton Mundraby in Atherton, Queensland on 29 January 1967, his father was Vincent Basil Mundraby (born in Yarrabah, 8 April 1941) and his mother was Violet Ruth Mundraby (born at Reeves Creek, Yarrabah, 14 June 1943) a direct descendant via his father, Vincent Mundraby (snr) and grandfather Fred Mundraby, of Jabulum Mandingalpai (aka Jimmy Jabulam).

Jabulum Mandingalpai was an early Yidinji leader and survivor of 19th century violent occupation and settlement of Trinity Bay, Queensland consequent to the proclamation of Trinity Bay (i.e. Yidinji country) in 1876 to be a North Queensland port.

The Mandingalbay Yidinji .. describe themselves as the descendants of the man known as "Jabulum Mandingalpai" ... Yabalam and his wife Biddie had four children, who were, in birth order, Tommy Read, Maggie Mundraby, Fred Mundraby and Amy Hyde, but the spokesmen for the current group are a sub-set of Fred Mundraby’s descendants, namely, Basil Vincent Mundraby (aka Vincent Mundraby Sr), his nephew Alf Mundraby and his son Vincent Mark ("Boy") Mundraby. They know that their family name "Mundraby" has its origins in the missionaries’ attempts to pronounce and write the indigenous personal name, Mandi Ngarrbay.

== Native Title ==
As a direct descendant of Jabulum Mandingalpai, Vincent Mundraby was born into a Mandingalbay Yidinji family with the status and authority necessary to represent the Mandingalbay Yidinji People in applying to the Federal Court of Australia, in his 20s, to obtain determinations under the Native Title Act 1993 that they have continued to observe traditional laws, and have continued to hold locally indigenous property rights (i.e. native title) to their own Yidinji country since before British sovereignty.

The area of land that we are talking about .. sits over that hill (from Cairns).. There are two leases: one, 580 acres, was issued in 1883; the second, 650 acres, was issued in 1884. Both leases expired in 1894. In 1892, the Yarrabah mission was founded by Gribble. So, a little over 103 years ago, that lease expired and was not taken up, and for over 103 years we have had a reserve in there.

Now that we have seen some light at the end of the tunnel, through Wik, we have the right to make a claim for this land. Hopefully, we will get a determination on it...We have documented oral history and evidence of my ancestors having big battles with the people who tried to take up the lease. What I am more or less saying is: seeing that this lease expired over 103 years ago, why should it be taken away or at least the chance of our people making claim to it be taken away?

As a representative for the Mandingalbay Yidinji People, Vincent Mundraby successfully applied to the Federal Court and obtained a positive Mundraby v State of Queensland native title determination in 2006, also representing the Mandingalbay Yidinji People to obtain a further positive Mundraby on behalf of the Combined Mandingalbay Yidinji-Gunggandji People v State of Queensland native title determination in 2012.

== Land Trust ==
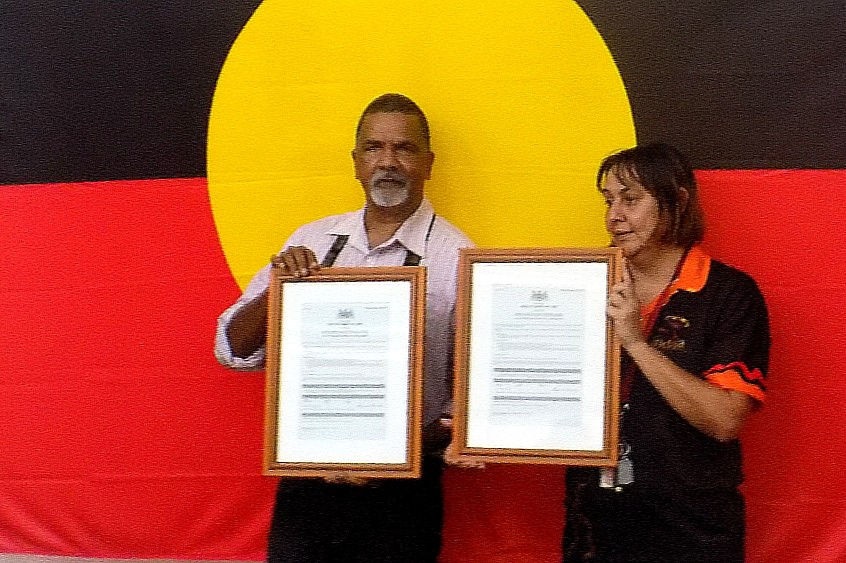
Aboriginal Land Trust received inalenable freehold title to more than 8000 hectares of original lands, @ Yarrabah 21 December 2015

In seeking to negotiate the 2012 Combined Mandingalbay Yidinji-Gunggandji People v State of Queensland native title determination, Vincent Mundraby was involved in reaching an agreement from State of Queensland and the Yarrabah Aboriginal Shire Council to transfer more than 8000 hectares of their original lands to themselves as the original owners, promised to be held as inalienable Aboriginal Freehold by an Aboriginal Land Trust of their own.

On 21 December 2015, after three years lobbying, an Aboriginal land trust had been formed; Vincent Mundraby was the first chairperson of this land trust; and Vincent Mundraby's great grandfather Jabulum and families' lands were successfully transferred to their land trust.

Chairman of the Gunggandji Mandingalbay Yidinji Peoples Aboriginal Corporation, Vince Mundraby, said that the land was going back to its rightful owners. “Now ... it will be managed properly, the right way, the Gunggandji and Mandingalbay Yidinji Peoples way, our way,” he said. “This will enable our community to develop an environmental economy, using our land, people and culture while transmitting to future generations a sustainable economy in a culturally appropriate manner that delivers a better quality of life.”

== Local Government ==
While in his late 30s, Vincent Mundraby was elected mayor of Yarrabah Aboriginal Shire Council and President of the Aboriginal Local Government Association of Queensland.

As Mayor of Yarrabah Aboriginal Shire Council Vincent Mundraby pursued land reform and, in 2007 for example, sought, negotiated. and reached a 'landmark' agreement with the Commonwealth Minister for Families, Community Services, and Indigenous Affairs securing $14 million for new housing, welfare reform, and land reform. for the largest of Australia's Aboriginal communities.

"Mr Mundraby was determined to put in place in Yarrabah changes linked to housing and welfare reform and economic development .. The Mayor is keen to take the opportunity of working with the Australian Government to achieve these aims and hopes that the Queensland Government proceeds quickly with the necessary legislation to change land tenure arrangements ..."I urge the Queensland Government to move quickly to introduce the necessary land reform. This will enable work to then commence on the new housing."

== World Heritage ==
Which Way our Cultural Survival?

Where in 1987, large proportions of the Mandingalpay Yidinji Peoples lands and forests were compulsorily placed and statutorily seized by the Australian Government onto the United Nations' World Heritage list, to be forever protected and preserved as World Heritage, Vincent Mundraby subsequently made significant efforts to see his own Mandingalpay Yidinji People, his fellow Yidinji People, and all the other Aboriginal Peoples (aka Bama) of the Wet Tropics World Heritage area take maximum responsibility and control from State Authorities and Agencies to themselves manage, live off, and make a living from the Wet Tropics World Heritage listed lands and forests.

In the late 1990s, for instance, Vincent Mundraby became the Aboriginal People's elected chairperson of a Bama Wabu (aka People of the Forests) non government organisation, then chairperson to a Steering Committee formed by Authorities following a period of Aboriginal protests, petitions and activism, to undertake a comprehensive 'Which Way our Cultural Survival? Review of Aboriginal Involvement in the Management of the Wet Tropics World Heritage Area' ultimately recommending (in 1998) a comprehensive regional agreement be negotiated between the Commonwealth Government, State Government, and Aboriginal Peoples towards recognizing Aboriginal land management and enabling World Heritage listed areas to be self managed by the World Heritage Area's Aboriginal Peoples (aka Bama).
