= Cairns Unity Team =

- Leader: Terry James
- Founder: Bob Manning
- Founded: January 2012
- Ideology: Localism, Liberalism, Conservatism
- Cairns Regional Council: 3 / 10

The Cairns Unity Team, also known as Cairns Unity, the Unity Team or simply Unity, is an Australian political party that competes in local elections for Cairns Regional Council and is affiliated with the Liberal National Party.

Until the 2024 election, Unity had a majority on council and held the mayoralty.

Kevin Byrne, a former mayor who was defeated in 2008, had previously run his team under the name of "Cairns Unity Team".

== History ==
In January 2012, Bob Manning announced his intention to run for mayor of Cairns at the local government elections with a team of candidates under the name "Unity 2012". Manning considered the team to be apolitical. He was elected mayor with 55.61% of the vote, and six Unity councillors were successful.

Manning was re-elected in 2016, with Unity running in seven of nine wards.

In 2020, Manning was elected to a third term with 81.25% of the vote after preferences. Six Unity councillors were elected, giving the party a majority on the council.

Manning resigned as mayor in November 2023. Unity councillor Terry James was appointed as his replacement until the 2024 election, while Jeremy Neal (also a Unity member, and later an unsuccessful LNP candidate for federal parliament) was appointed to replace James in Division 4. Terry James was later elected as the Liberal National state MP for Mulgrave.

== Electoral history ==
=== Mayor ===
Election year	Mayoral candidate	# of overall votes	% of overall vote	# of overall seats won	+/–
2012	Bob Manning			1 / 1	▲1
2016	Bob Manning			1 / 1	Steady
2020	Bob Manning	47,171	66.97	1 / 1	Steady
2024	Terry James	20,187	24.04	0 / 1	▼1

=== Councillors ===
Election year	# of overall votes	% of overall vote	# of overall wards won	+/–	Council control (term)
2012			6 / 10	▲6	Unity majority (2012−2024)
2016			6 / 9	Steady	Unity majority (2012−2024)
2020	26,395		6 / 9	Steady	Unity majority (2012−2024)
2024			3 / 9	▼3	No overall control (2024–present)
