= Little Mulgrave, Queensland =

Little Mulgrave
- Suburb
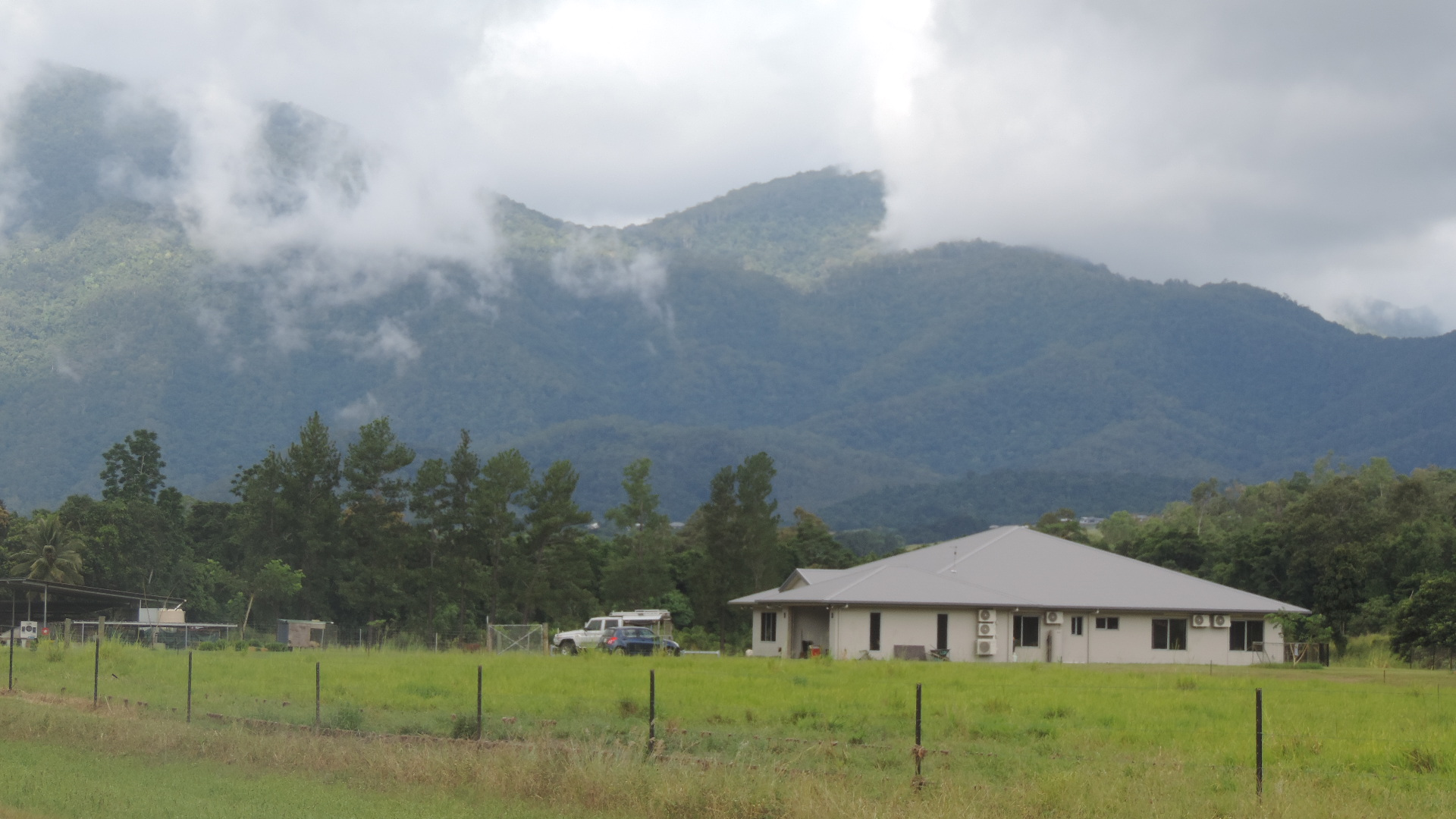
- Farm on Little Mulgrave Road, 2018

- Interactive map of Little Mulgrave
- Coordinates: 17.1361°S 145.7152°E
- Country: Australia
- State: Queensland
- LGA: Cairns Region
- Location: 10.1 km (6.3 mi) SW of Gordonvale; 33.0 km (20.5 mi) SSW of Cairns CBD; 333 km (207 mi) NNW of Townsville; 1,690 km (1,050 mi) NNW of Brisbane

Government
  - State electorate: Mulgrave
  - Federal division: Kennedy

Area
  - Total: 18.8 km^{2} (7.3 sq mi)

Population
  - Total: 269 (2021 census)
  - Density: 14.31/km^{2} (37.06/sq mi)
- Time zone: UTC+10:00 (AEST)
- Postcode: 4865
Suburbs around Little Mulgrave
Lamb Range	Lamb Range	Lamb Range
Lamb Range	Little Mulgrave	Gordonvale
Lamb Range	Goldsborough	Goldsborough

Little Mulgrave is a rural locality in the Cairns Region, Queensland, Australia. In the 2021 census, Little Mulgrave had a population of 269 people.

== Geography ==
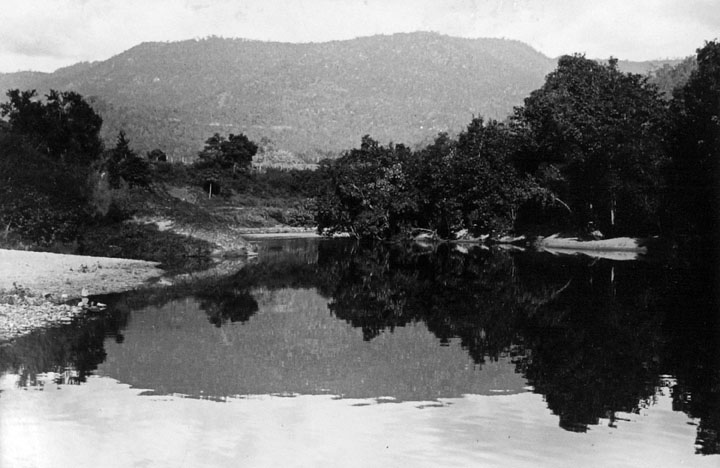
Little Mulgrave River, circa 1935

The western part of the locality is the valley of the Little Mulgrave River and the eastern part of the locality is the valley of the Mulgrave River. The Gillies Range Road runs through the locality connecting Gordonvale and the lower localities in the Cairns Region with the Atherton Tableland.

A discontiguous section of the Wooroonooran National Park is in the eastern end of the locality. The developed land is mainly around the rivers as the ground rises sharply into the more mountainous terrain away from the rivers. The land use is a mixture of crop growing (including sugarcane), grazing on native vegetation, and rural residential housing around the rivers. There is a quarry in the south of the locality.

There is a cane tramway through the locality to deliver the harvested sugarcane to the Mulgrave Sugar Mill.

== History ==
The Cairns-Mulgrave Tramway operated from 1897 to 1911, when it was integrated into the Queensland Rail.

In August 1925, the Queensland Government decided to establish a primary school at a cost of £930. Little Mulgrave State School opened on 26 July 1926. A teacher's residence was built in 1937. The school closed on 21 February 1964, after which the students were transported each day to Gordonvale State School in neighbouring Gordonvale to the east.

In October 1924, Carl Ross had the first public telephone in Little Mulgrave installed in his residence. In March 1926, Carl and his wife Frances Isabel Roos established the Mountain View Hotel. They had a homestead in the district and were long-time residents. Roos Road is named after them.

== Demographics ==
In the 2016 census, Little Mulgrave had a population of 249 people.

In the 2021 census, Little Mulgrave had a population of 269 people.

== Education ==
There are no schools in Little Mulgrave. The nearest government primary and secondary schools are Gordonvale State School and Gordonvale State High School, both in neighbouring Gordonvale to the east.

== Amenities ==
The Mountain View Hotel continues to operate at 864 Gillies Range Road (17.1405°S 145.7233°E). The rear deck overlooks the Mulgrave River.

== Facilities ==
Little Mulgrave Rural Fire Brigade is on Little Mulgrave Road (17.13582°S 145.71363°E).
