= Richard Alfred Tills =

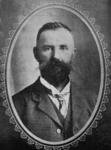
- Mayor 1907

Mayor, Cairns City Council
- Incumbent
- Assumed office 1900
- Incumbent
- Assumed office 1901
- Incumbent
- Assumed office 1907

Personal details
- Born: 1860; Kingston upon Hull, England
- Died: 1937, Aged 77; Cairns, Qld, Australia
- Spouse: Caroline Adelaide Anderson
- Children: Alfred (born 1898); Richard (born 1900); Ivy (born 1901); Olive (born 1903); Marie (born 1905)
- Profession: Mayor, Carpenter, Architect

Richard Alfred Tills (1860–1937) was the fourth mayor of Cairns, Australia and the twelfth chairman when Cairns was classified as a borough, a member of the Barron Divisional Board, and president of the Cairns Chamber of Commerce. Born in Kingston upon Hull, England, Tills was a carpenter, architect and one of the pioneers of North Queensland.

== Early life and career ==
Richard Alfred Tills was born on 12 June 1860 in Kingston upon Hull, East Riding of Yorkshire, England. He was the eldest son of Alice Harrison and Alfred Tills, originally a carpenter, but a newsagent by the time Richard was born and later a grocer. Richard had two younger brothers, twins, Charles William and John Henry—John died at the age of 3. Richard worked as a master joiner in Hull before emigrating to Australia under the Assisted Immigration program, arriving in Mackay on 2 November 1882 at the age of 22.

After brief stints working as a carpenter in Mackay and Townsville, Richard became an early pioneer of North Queensland arriving in Cairns in 1883. Within six months of his arrival at Trinity Bay, Cairns, he had qualified as a contractor and worked on the construction of numerous buildings in Cairns. Several years later, he assayed mining, prospecting on the Mulgrave goldfield, south of Cairns, where he erected a water-wheel battery. After processing 600 tonnes of stone from various mines, a disillusioned Tills returned to work with timber.

Tills moved to the Atherton Tableland and established a sawmill at Redlynch, eight miles from Cairns, on the Cairns-Mareeba railway line, with Charles Michael, Robert Warren and three times Mayor of Cairns, Louis Severin. By 1889, Richard Tills was the sole proprietor of the Cairns Saw Mill. In 1899, he moved the sawmill to Cairns along the Mulgrave tramway line. The five acres site was situated on Alligator Creek, a site eminently suitable, as the tramway line passed just in front of the works, and Alligator creek ran within a hundred yards of the back of the mill—having a depth of 14 ft at high tides, the creek was very useful in floating logs up and down from and to the Cairns inlet. The main shed was 150 ft x 60 ft, and the offices, timber shed, and workshop (a two-storey building) was 30 x 24 ft. A shed was erected to stack timber during the rainy season. In 1899, Tills had fifteen men employed at the mill and a similar number engaged getting logs.

During the early part of the century, there was a trend away from the construction of buildings with timber to reinforced concrete or cavity brick as a response to significant damage caused by frequent cyclones in the area, though there was no reported downturn in business at Till's sawmill. In 1906, a prospectus was issued for the floatation of a company to take over the timber business and saw-mills he owned with Mr T Griffith. He sold his timber business in March 1907.

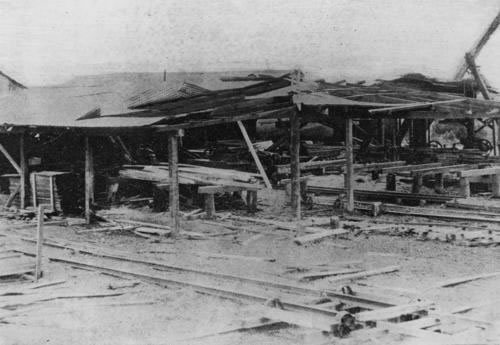
Cyclone damage to Till's Sawmills, 1906

Richard Tills was a founding member of the Cairns Artillery Volunteer Corps on 8 February 1886, which was formed in response to the Russian scare of 1883^{6}—the Russians had moved into the Pacific, Germany and had annexed the northern part of New Guinea, concerning the Queensland colonial government. It forced the government to consider the idea of colonial defence and voluntary defence organizations. The Volunteer Corp was initially formed under a Volunteer Act and later the Defence Act. It was initially composed of 30 men and three officers. Tills quickly rose from the rank of sergeant, to lieutenant in 1886, to captain in 1891. He was commanding officer of the corps from 1886. Richard's son, Alfred fought in the First and Second World Wars . The Cairns Post provided reports about Alfred's time in WWI, publishing letters he sent his father from Belgium in their section The Soldiers' Postbag, as well as announcements of him being wounded in 1917, and 1918. Richard's nephew, John Alfred Tills also served in the First World War— he was killed in action at the age of 21.

Richard Tills' height was referred to on multiple occasions by the media—he was reportedly the tallest soldier in the Volunteer Artillery Corp. at 6 ft. 8in tall. A 1907 recount reported “In a personal article on the recent Brisbane Exhibition, entitled “Pen Pictures”, the “Sun” thus refers to the Mayor of Cairns:- “A veritable son of Anak, one of Amalek’s prodigious progeny, is Richard Alfred Tills...Tills is 6 feet 5 inches and weighs 16 stone. He walks along Queen Street towering above the crowd, and making small men feel as little as Tom Thumb...would have been an imposing figure in Parliament”.

Richard Tills was one of the officers of the first Masonic Lodge to be formed in Cairns.

== Public life ==
The first local government of Cairns was established in 1879. Six years later, Tills, at the age of 24, was elected an Alderman of the Cairns Divisional Board, then the only local governing body in the district, and which had jurisdiction over the territory now comprised within the areas under the control of the Cairns Shire Council, the Barron Shire Council, and the Cairns Town Council.

In 1890, Richard Tills so impressed the members with his practical knowledge and business tact that he was elected chairman of the board, a position which he held until the disintegration of that body and the formation of the Barron Divisional Board and the Cairns Municipal Council at the end of 1890. Tills was unanimously appointed the first chairman of the Barron Divisional Board and held the position for a further two years. One of the significant achievements during his time on the Barron Divisional Board was construction of the first link between Cairns and the back country, by extending the coach road from Kuranda to Mareeba through Cairns. Tills had then worked for the continuing of the railway from Cairns into the back country.

He was elected Mayor of Cairns three times, in 1900, 1901 and 1907, following in the footsteps of his great-grandfather, Newton Tills who was Mayor of Colchester, Essex, England in 1793.

Richard Tills had a leading role in the reestablishment of the Cairns School of Arts Technical College and was its first president in 1899. The school started with classes in shorthand, bookkeeping and dressmaking. In May 1900, classes were suspended in all areas except shorthand because classes were not self-supporting and insufficient support was provided by the Works Department.

In 1900, Richard was appointed to the first joint board for the prevention of epidemic diseases comprising Cairns, Hinchinbrook, Cardwell, and Johnstone districts. He became a justice of the peace on 23 April 1890.

In 1904, Tills nominated as the Cairns member in the Parliament of Queensland, as a member of the Oppositionist party, but was unsuccessful. In this election, Richard Tills was a strong supporter for the establishment of a technical college in North Queensland not primarily as a means for higher education, but he believed that but it would teach boys how to become good workmen and keep them from congregating at street corners at night smoking cigarettes. He wanted technical colleges in every district and didn't agree with sending Northern boys to Gatton College, because the Northern climate and other conditions were entirely different from South East Queensland. He believed training boys in chemistry, agriculture, mineralogy, among other things would eliminate the need to import labour—"Our young men were as intelligent as those in any part of the world, and all they wanted was a system of education, which would give them a chance to learn."

In 1905, Tills was appointed a Licensing justice for the Cairns district.

Richard Tills occupied many other positions of honour, responsibility, and trust in the community. He was a member of the Cairns Hospital Committee, superintendent of the Cairns Fire Brigade Board and president of the Cairns Chamber of Commerce. He was described as an energetic member of the Advertising Board which worked to publish information regarding the resources and potentialities of the Far North throughout the world. He was also one of the strongest and most persistent advocates of the Cairns Waterworks Scheme.

Richard Tills was an appointed Inspector of Public Works at Cairns in 1914—the appointment was popular because Tills was considered a practical man. He held that position for 13 years, until his retirement in 1927. During his time as Works Inspector, Tills was associated with the launching of the Federal Government's soldier settlement and homes scheme in the district.

Richard Tills was reported as having a happy, humorous style. In response to a question during his 1904 campaign for example, when asked if in favor of abolishing gambling and other evils in Chinatown, he replied "that he was in favor of abolishing all sin, original or otherwise if it were possible, and if legislative enactments could do it, he would do his utmost to get that legislation. He was very much afraid, however, that the form of evil which had been existing since the time that men and women first trod the earth would be rather difficult to extinguish by a Queensland Parliament". Similarly, when his character was under attack in the 1907 campaign, he refused to introduce personalities into the debate – "Mr. Hunter asserted that he (Tills) had no sense and had been born without sense. This he did not regard as a reflection upon himself, but it looked like a serious reflection upon the public who had put him in certain positions. (Laughter.) If they really thought it was right they would not vote for him tomorrow. There was another little thing Mr. Hunter had done for him. He had produced the little booklet which he (the speaker) now held in his hands. It was called 'What Mr. R. A. Tills had done for Cairns during his 21 years of public life,' and inside were four blank sheets. (Laughter.) Well, he took that as a compliment as an acknowledgment by his opponent even that he had a clean sheet."

He was also active in the social and spiritual activities in Cairns. He was the founding president of a cricket club at Redlynch in 1898; office bearer at St John's Church; and the Masonic lodge.

Veterans of the Cairns District, 1926

Portrait of former Cairns Mayor R. A. Tills, 1926

== Personal life ==
On 30 April 1896, at the age of 35, Richard married 22-year-old Caroline Adelaide Anderson, daughter of fellow North Queensland pioneer, council member, and Danish immigrant, Christian Peter Anderson. Richard and Caroline had five children together:

  - Alfred Christian (b. 26 March 1898, Cairns)
  - Richard (b. 14 January 1900, Cairns)
  - Ivy (b. 28 June 1901, Cairns)
  - Olive (b. 2 April 1903, Cairns)
  - Marie Alice (b. 3 November 1905, Cairns)

In his bid for election in 1907, it was reported that there had been significant health problems in his family “as Kipling would say, Illness in the breadwinner's family is always a big handicap. Mr. Tills, however, is evidently a man of grit and pluck. He does not carry his heart upon his sleeve. He holds up his head in the presence of his fellowmen.” His wife Caroline was admitted to the Toowoomba Hospital for the Insane in June 1906, 7 months after the birth of their youngest child. During 1915, at least two of his children, Marie and Ivy, lived in New Farm, Brisbane, attending New Farm State School. On 5 May 1915, Marie was seriously injured in a school yard fall—she recovered from her injuries. Tills was in the Gulf on official business at the time. His wife Caroline died later that year on 1 October 1915 at the Hospital for the Insane in Toowoomba; Tills never remarried.

Richard Tills died on 7 June 1937 at the age of 76 of Phlebitis, Pneumonia, and Heart Failure. He was the oldest member of the Gregory Masonic Lodge in Cairns, and was accorded a Masonic funeral by Rev. Johnston, of St John's Church of England, who conducted a service at the graveside in the Cairns Pioneer Cemetery in McLeod Street. He was survived by his five children and eight grandchildren.

His estate was left to his eldest daughter Ivy and included property (Subdivisions 73–96 of Allotment 2 of Suburban section 94; Allotments 1 and 2 of Suburban section 86; and Allotment 1 of Suburban section 85, Country of Nares, Parish of Cairns) and personal effects.

Richard Tills was regarded as a man of good character—at the time of his death it was reported that he had lived an irreproachable life and been an outstanding figure in the Far North. It has been noted that “like others of that pioneering hand, who performed such lasting service to the north, Mr. Tills was characteristically reticent regarding his part, though during his long association with its development and public life he amassed valuable knowledge of historic interest”. Throughout his time in Cairns, it had grown from a town of 278 people to a city of more than 12 000.

== Legacy ==
Tills Street in Westcourt, Cairns is named after Richard Alfred Tills.

== Ancestry ==
Ancestors of Richard Alfred Tills

16. John Tills
8. Newton Tills
17. Elizabeth
4. John Newton Tills
9. Martha Tompson
2. Alfred Tills
10. James Harris
5. Harriet Harris
11. Mary
1. Richard Alfred Tills
6. John Harrison
3. Alice Harrison
7. Sarah
