= Goldsborough, Queensland =

Goldsborough
- Suburb
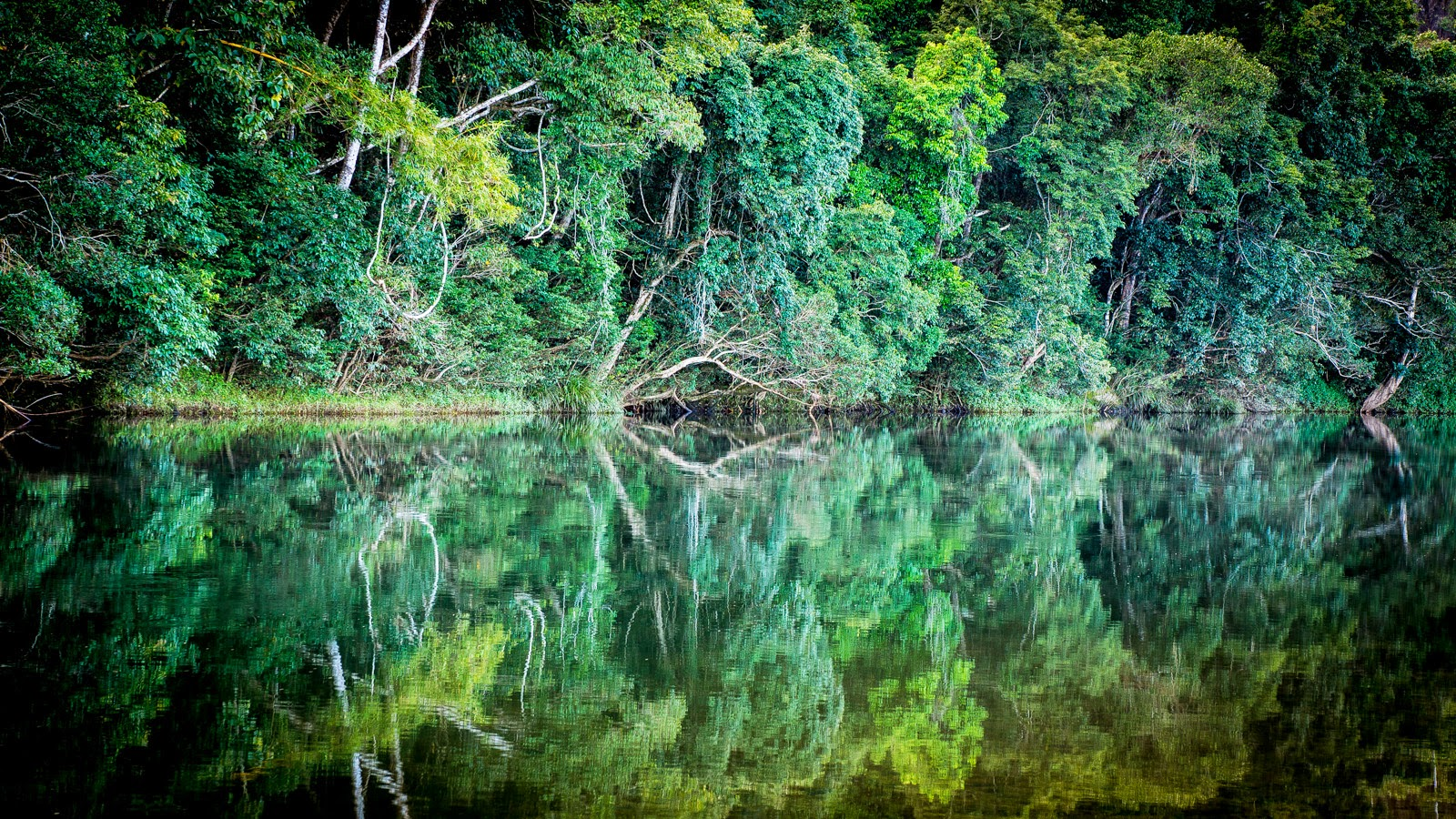
- Mulgrave River at Goldsborough Valley

- Interactive map of Goldsborough
- Coordinates: 17.19°S 145.7361°E
- Country: Australia
- State: Queensland
- LGA: Cairns Region
- Location: 9.5 km (5.9 mi) SW of Gordonvale; 32.4 km (20.1 mi) S of Cairns CBD; 1,695 km (1,053 mi) NNW of Brisbane

Government
  - State electorate: Mulgrave
  - Federal division: Kennedy

Area
  - Total: 65.9 km^{2} (25.4 sq mi)

Population
  - Total: 1,099 (2021 census)
  - Density: 16.677/km^{2} (43.19/sq mi)
- Time zone: UTC+10:00 (AEST)
- Postcode: 4865
Suburbs around Goldsborough
Lamb Range	Little Mulgrave	Gordonvale
Gadgarra	Goldsborough	Wooroonooran
Gadgarra	Gadgarra	Wooroonooran

Goldsborough is a mixed-use locality in the Cairns Region, Queensland, Australia. In the 2021 census, Goldsborough had a population of 1,099 people.

== Geography ==
The Mulgrave River flows from the south to the north-east of the locality, forming its northern boundary. The river which is at 20–60 metres above sea level forms a north–south valley through the locality with mountainous land rising on the east (to an unnamed peak of 560 metres) and to Mount Mac (just beyond the locality's western boundary at 900 metres).

The most northerly part of the locality is somewhat lower (100–140 metres above sea level) and is freehold, containing the residential component of the locality and some agriculture use. Further south, the land to the west of the Mulgrave River is freehold but is mostly undeveloped apart from some residential and agriculture use along the river, while the land to the east of the river is undeveloped and forms part of the Wooroonooran National Park, which is part of the Wet Tropics World Heritage Area.

Road access into Goldsborough is via the Gillies Range Road which passes through neighbouring Little Mulgrave to the north of the locality. There is road access to the areas using for housing and agriculture, but beyond that there are only a few tracks through the mountainous terrain.

== History ==
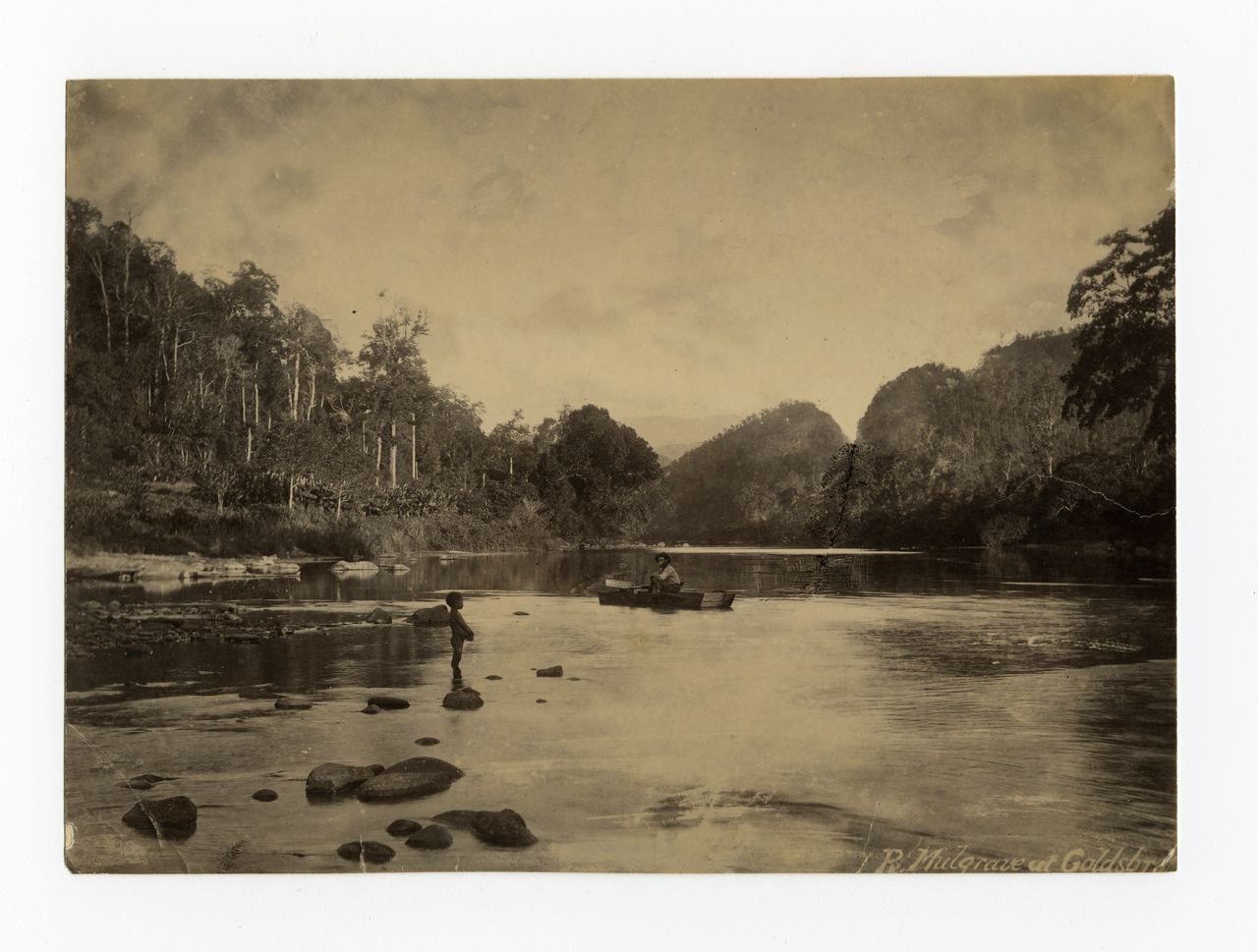
River Mulgrave at Goldsborough, 1890

The Goldsborough Valley is the traditional country of the Dulabed Malanbarra Yidinji speaking clan, part of the Yidinji people.

In 1879, W Diecke discovered gold near the Mulgrave River resulting in a goldrush for a few years. Alluvial gold was found in the Mulgrave River and its tributaries, the Toohey and Butcher Creeks. Two settlements formed, one called Top Camp on Butcher Creek and the other called Lower Camp or Fanning Town on Toohey Creek. Fanning Town was named after police magistrate Major Matthew Patrick Boyle Fanning but was later renamed Goldsborough. The Mulgrave goldfield yielded 3894 ounces of gold between 1879 and 1886, and by the early 1990s no more gold was found and many storekeepers in the settlements moved to the better located Gordonvale.

As a result of the gold rush, large quantities of valuable red cedar trees (Toona ciliata) were found in the forests, attracting loggers in the 1880s. By the early 1890s little red cedar remained in the area. Some farmers and graziers were also attracted into the area including grazier Frank Kearney after whom Kearneys Falls and Kearneys Flat were named.

== Demographics ==
In the 2016 census, Goldsborough had a population of 929 people.

In the 2021 census, Goldsborough had a population of 1,099 people.

== Education ==
There are no schools in Goldsborough. The nearest government primary and secondary schools are Gordonvale State School and Gordonvale State High School, both in Gordonvale to the north-east.

== Amenities ==
Goldsborough Community Church is at 10-12 Aitken Close (17.1490°S 145.75455°E). It is part of the Wesleyan Methodist Church.
