= Kearneys Falls =

- Location within Queensland
- Location: Far North Queensland, Australia
- Coordinates: 17°14′06″S 145°47′07″E
- Type: Cascade

The Kearneys Falls is a cascade waterfall on a tributary of the Mulgrave River, in the Wooroonooran National Park, in the Goldsborough Valley of Far North region of Queensland, Australia.

== Location and features ==
Access to the falls is via a 1.6 kilometres (0.99 mi) walking track.

Camping facilities and the walking track to Kearneys Falls were closed in 2006 due to severe damage by both Tropical Cyclone Larry and Tropical Cyclone Monica. Camping facilities are available at the camp site and the track to the falls is open.

== History ==
The falls were named after Frank Kearney, a grazier in the Mulgrave River area who died in 1918.

== See also ==
- List of waterfalls
- List of waterfalls in Australia
