= Desmond Trannore Bridge =

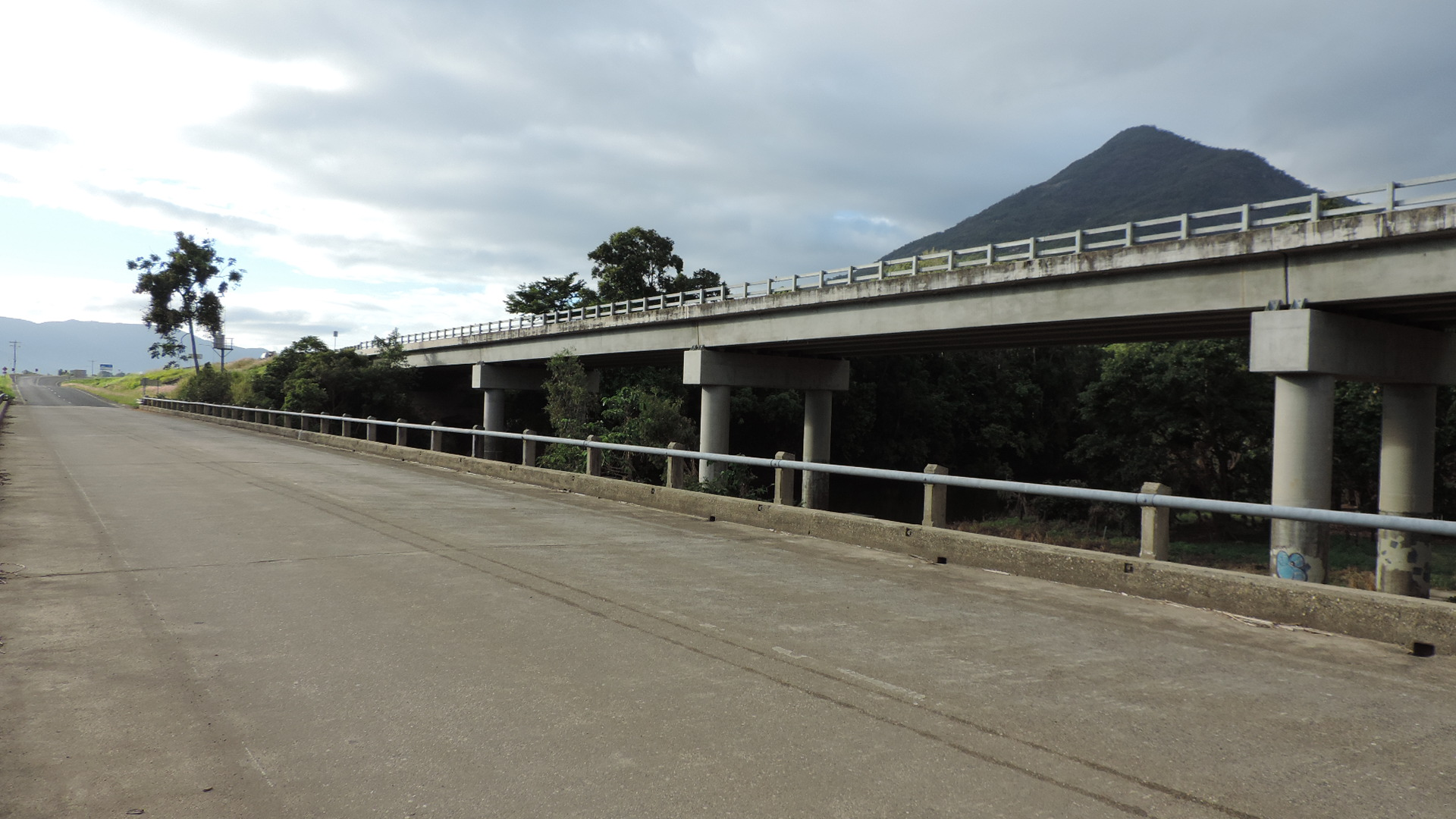
- Desmond Trannore Bridge across the Mulgrave River, 2018
- Coordinates: 17°06′04″S 145°47′21″E
- Carries: Bruce Highway (Motor vehicles)
- Crosses: Mulgrave River
- Locale: Gordonvale, Queensland, Australia

Characteristics
- Design: Girder bridge
- Material: Concrete
- Total length: 482 metres (1,581 ft)

History
- Construction start: 29 May 2008
- Construction cost: A$48 million
- Opened: 20 April 2009
- Replaces: low-set Mulgrave River Bridge

The Desmond Trannore Bridge is a road bridge that carries the Bruce Highway over the Mulgrave River in Gordonvale, in Far North Queensland, Australia.

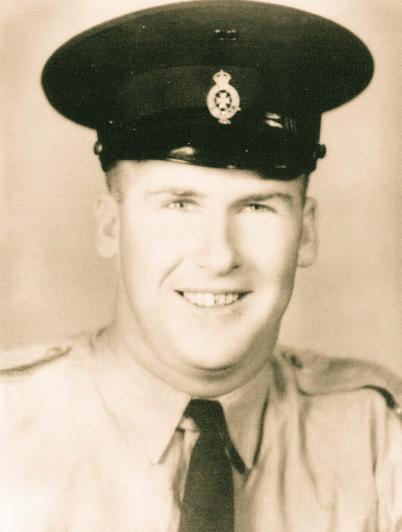
Senior Constable Desmond Trannore

The 482-metre (1,581 ft)-long bridge is 5 metres (16 ft) higher than the former Mulgrave River Bridge, to improve flood immunity during the wet season. It is also located 30 metres (98 ft) upstream from the former bridge on a better alignment of the Bruce Highway. The old Mulgrave River Bridge was regularly submerged by flood waters during the wet season.

The construction of the bridge was fast-tracked by installation of 50 precast concrete girders. The bridge was completed as part of a number of projects undertaken by the Australian Government to flood-proof the Bruce Highway and provide all year round access to Far North Queensland.

The bridge is named in honour of Senior Constable Desmond Trannore, of Gordonvale Police Station, who was shot and killed in the line of duty on 27 October 1964, while assisting a woman and her children following a report of domestic violence.
