= Cairns Region =

Local government area of Queensland, Australia

Coordinates: 16°55′24″S 145°46′26″E

- Local government area
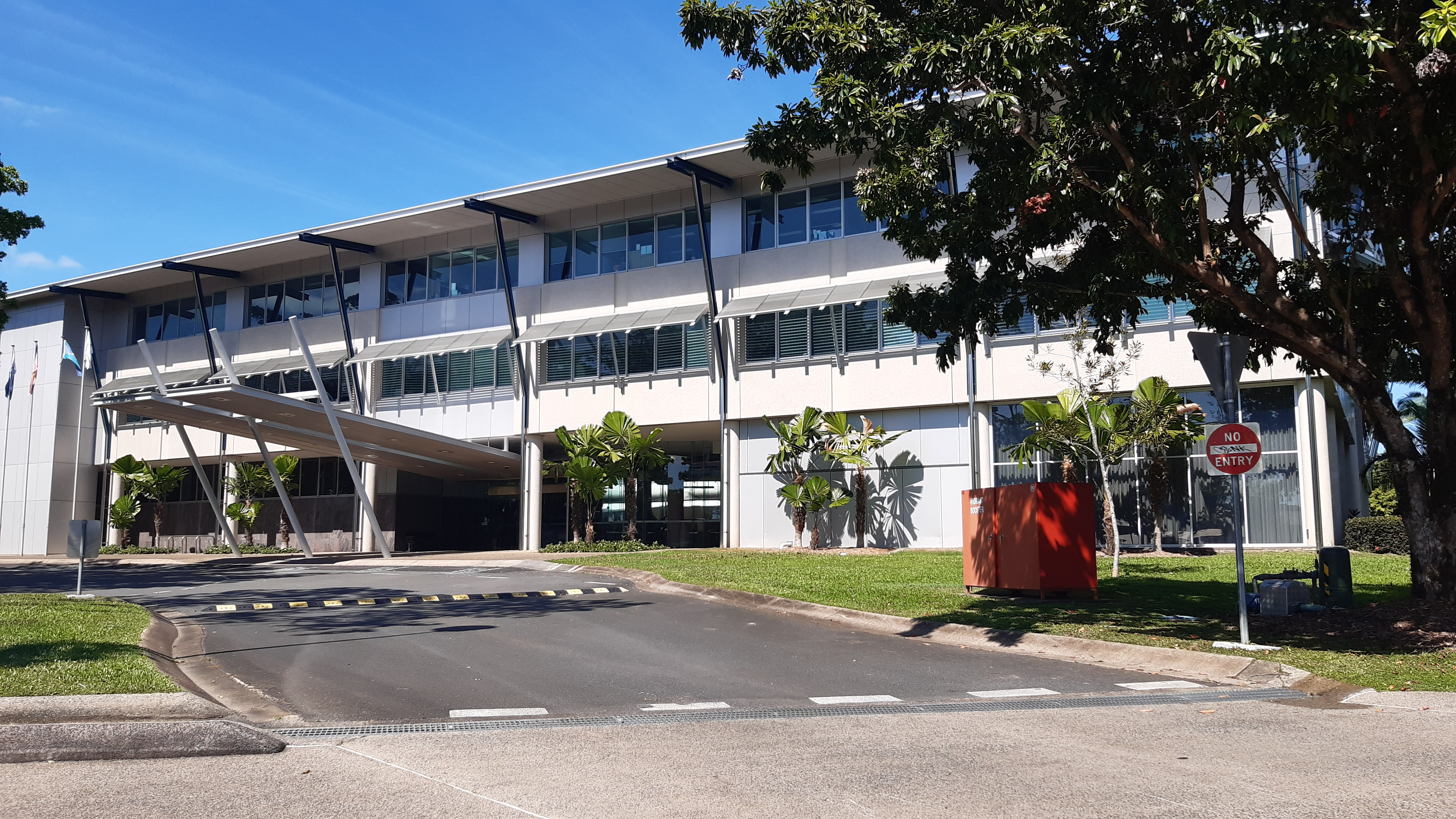
- Cairns Regional Council offices on Spence Street in Cairns

- Interactive map of Cairns Region
- Country: Australia
- State: Queensland
- Region: Far North Queensland
- Established: 2008
- Council seat: Cairns City

Government
  - Mayor: Amy Eden
  - State electorate: Barron River, Cairns, Cook, Hill, Mulgrave
  - Federal divisions: Leichhardt; Kennedy

Area
  - Total: 1,689 km^{2} (652 sq mi)

Population
  - Total: 166,943 (2021 census) (38th)
  - Density: 98.841/km^{2} (256.00/sq mi)
- Website: Cairns Region
LGAs around Cairns Region
Mareeba	Wujal Wujal; Shire of Douglas	Coral Sea
Mareeba	Cairns Region	Yarrabah Aboriginal Shire
Tablelands	Cassowary Coast	Coral Sea

The Cairns Region is a local government area in Far North Queensland, Queensland, Australia, centred on the regional city of Cairns. It was established in 2008 by the amalgamation of the City of Cairns and the Shire of Douglas. However, following public protest and a referendum in 2013, on 1 January 2014, the Shire of Douglas was de-amalgamated from the Cairns Region and re-established as a separate local government authority.

The Cairns Regional Council's 2023–24 operating budget was A$433.5 million.

In the 2021 census, the Cairns Region had a population of 166,943 people.

== History ==
=== First Nations ===
Yidinji (also known as Yidinj, Yidiny, and Idindji) is an Australian Aboriginal language and a traditional Indigenous country. Its traditional language region is within the local government areas of Cairns Region and Tablelands Region, in such localities as Cairns City (CBD), Gordonvale, and the Mulgrave River, and the southern part of the Atherton Tableland including Atherton and Kairi.

Tjapukai (also known as Djabuganydji, Djabugay, and Djabuganydji) is the traditional Aboriginal country and language north of the Barron River in the Cairns Region, with the traditional group extending west towards Mareeba and north towards Douglas Shire and Port Douglas.

=== Post colonisation ===
The origins of local government in Far North Queensland lie in the Local Government Act 1878, under which 74 Divisions (local government areas) were created, including the Cairns Division.

The Douglas Division was created on 3 June 1880 by excising part of Cairns Division.

Under the Local Authorities Act 1902 Cairns Division was redesignated as the Shire of Cairns and Douglas Division was redesignated as the Shire of Douglas on 31 March 1903.

The Borough of Cairns was proclaimed on 28 May 1885 under the Local Government Act 1878, and was created by excising part of the Cairns Division. With the passage of the Local Authorities Act 1902, it became a Town on 31 March 1903, and was proclaimed a City on 12 October 1923. For most of its existence Cairns City covered only the central business district and inner suburbs.

On 20 December 1919, Barron Shire was abolished, and part of its area was transferred to Cairns Shire. On 16 November 1940, Cairns Shire was renamed Mulgrave Shire.

On 21 November 1991, the Electoral and Administrative Review Commission, created two years earlier, produced its second report, and recommended that local government boundaries in the Cairns area be rationalised, and that the Shire be dissolved and amalgamated with the City of Cairns. The Local Government (Cairns, Douglas, Mareeba and Mulgrave) Regulation 1994 was gazetted on 16 December 1994. On 22 March 1995, Mulgrave Shire was abolished and became part of the City of Cairns.

In July 2007, the Local Government Reform Commission released its report and recommended that Cairns amalgamate with the Shire of Douglas, and that the new Cairns Regional Council be undivided with 10 councilors and a mayor. On 15 March 2008, Cairns City and Douglas Shire ceased to exist, and elections were held on the same day to elect councilors and a mayor to the replacement Regional Council.

In 2012, a proposal was made to de-amalgamate the Shire of Douglas from the Cairns Region. On 9 March 2013, the citizens of the former Douglas shire voted in a referendum to de-amalgamate. The shire was re-established on 1 January 2014.

== Towns and localities ==
The Cairns Region includes the following settlements:

Cairns Central area:

- Aeroglen
- Bungalow
- Cairns City
- Cairns North
- Earlville
- Edge Hill
- Kanimbla
- Manoora
- Manunda
- Mooroobool
- Parramatta Park
- Portsmith
- Westcourt
- Whitfield

Northern Mulgrave area:

- Barron
- Barron Gorge
- Brinsmead
- Buchan Point
- Caravonica
- Clifton Beach
- Ellis Beach
- Freshwater
- Holloways Beach
- Kamerunga
- Kewarra Beach
- Lamb Range
- Macalister Range
- Machans Beach
- Palm Cove
- Redlynch
- Smithfield
- Stratford
- Trinity Beach
- Trinity Park
- Yorkeys Knob

Southern Mulgrave area:

- Aloomba
- Babinda
- Bartle Frere
- Bayview Heights
- Bellenden Ker
- Bentley Park
- Bramston Beach
- Deeral
- East Russell
- East Trinity
- Edmonton
- Eubenangee^{1}
- Fishery Falls
- Fitzroy Island
- Glen Boughton
- Goldsborough
- Gordonvale
- Green Hill
- Green Island
- Kamma
- Little Mulgrave
- Meringa
- Miriwinni
- Mount Peter
- Mount Sheridan
- Ngatjan^{1}
- Packers Camp
- Waugh Pocket
- White Rock
- Woopen Creek
- Wooroonooran^{2}
- Woree
- Wrights Creek

^{1} – shared with Cassowary Coast Region
^{2} – shared with Cassowary Coast Region and Tablelands Region

== Libraries ==
The Cairns Regional Council operate public libraries at Babinda, Cairns City, Earlville, Edmonton, Gordonvale, Manunda, Smithfield and Stratford.

== Demographics ==
The populations given relate to the component entities prior to 2008.

The only census in which the Cairns Region included the Douglas Shire was conducted in 2011.

Year	Total Region	Cairns (C)	Mulgrave (S)	Douglas (S)
1933	25,197	11,993	10,303	2,901
1947	29,622	16,644	10,485	2,493
1954	37,597	21,020	13,477	3,100
1961	42,985	25,204	14,427	3,354
1966	45,927	26,696	15,312	3,919
1971	51,345	30,288	16,985	4,072
1976	62,628	34,857	23,025	4,746
1981	76,388	39,096	31,335	5,957
1986	91,688	42,227	41,711	7,750
1991	116,584	49,361	54,783	12,440
1996	129,698	116,718		12,980
2001	133,903	119,937		13,966
2006	150,484	136,460		14,024
2011	167,355	156,169		11,186
2016	156,901			
2021	166,943			

In the 2016 census, the Cairns Region had a population of 156,901 people.

In the 2021 census, the Cairns Region had a population of 166,943 people. 34.4% described their ancestry as English. This is followed by 30.0% who described their ancestry as Australian, then Irish (10.5%), Scottish (9.3%) and Australian Aboriginal at 7.1%. 76.8% spoke only English at home followed by the next most common languages: 1.4% Japanese, 0.7% Mandarin, 0.7% Nepali, 0.6% Punjabi and 0.6% Creole. Indigenous Australians were listed as making up 9.7% of the Cairns Region population.

== Council ==
Cairns Regional Council

Type
- Type: Unicameral

Leadership
- Mayor: Amy Eden, Team Eden
- Deputy Mayor: Brett Olds, Independent One Nation

Structure
- Seats: 10 elected representatives, including a Mayor and 9 councillors
- Political groups: Independents (3); Cairns Unity (3); Team Eden (2); Independent LNP (1); QLD Socialists (1)

Elections
- Last election: 16 March 2024
- Next election: 25 March 2028

On 1 January 2014, Julia Leu ceased to be a Councillor upon the de-amalgamation of the Shire of Douglas, having been elected as mayor of the Shire of Douglas in November 2013.

On 31 January 2015, Rob Pyne was elected to the Legislative Assembly of Queensland and resigned as a Councillor. Cathy Zeiger was appointed on 12 March 2015 to replace Rob Pyne by a panel comprising Mayor Bob Manning and former Councillors Fran Lindsay and Jeff Pezzutti.

Bob Manning announced his retirement as mayor on 17 November 2023. Councillor Terry James was elected as mayor on 22 November 2023.

=== Current composition ===
The current council, elected in 2024, is:

Ward	Councillor	Party
Mayor	Amy Eden	Team Eden
Division 1	Brett Moller	Cairns Unity
Division 2	Matthew Tickner	Independent LNP
Division 3	Cathy Zeiger	Independent
Division 4	Trevor Tim	Team Eden
Division 5	Rob Pyne	QLD Socialists
Division 6	Kristy Vallely	Cairns Unity
Division 7	Anna Middleton	Independent
Division 8	Rhonda Coghlan	Cairns Unity
Division 9	Brett Olds	Independent One Nation

== Past councillors ==
=== 2008−present ===
Year	Division 1	Division 2	Division 3	Division 4	Division 5	Division 6	Division 7	Division 8	Division 9	Division 10
Year	Councillor	Councillor	Councillor	Councillor	Councillor	Councillor	Councillor	Councillor	Councillor	Councillor
2008	Paul Gregory (Ind.)	Nancy Lanskey (Ind.)	Rob Pyne (Ind. Labor)	Kristen Lesina (Ind.)	Alan Blake (Ind.)	Linda Cooper (Ind.)	Diane Forsyth (Ind.)	Margaret Cochrane (Ind.)	Sno Bonneau (Ind.)	Julia Leu (Ind.)
2012	Steve Brain (Ind.)	John Schilling (Unity)	Rob Pyne (Ind. Labor)	Terry James (Unity)	Richie Bates (Unity/Ind.)	Linda Cooper (Ind.)	Max O'Halloran (Unity)	Jessie Richardson (Unity)	Greg Fennell (Unity)	Julia Leu (Ind.)
2014	Steve Brain (Ind.)	John Schilling (Unity)	Rob Pyne (Ind. Labor)	Terry James (Unity)	Richie Bates (Unity/Ind.)	Linda Cooper (Ind.)	Max O'Halloran (Unity)	Jessie Richardson (Unity)	Greg Fennell (Unity)	9 wards (2014−present)
2015	Steve Brain (Ind.)	John Schilling (Unity)	Cathy Zeiger (Ind.)	Terry James (Unity)	Richie Bates (Unity/Ind.)	Linda Cooper (Ind.)	Max O'Halloran (Unity)	Jessie Richardson (Unity)	Greg Fennell (Unity)	9 wards (2014−present)
2016	Brett Moller (Unity)	John Schilling (Unity)	Cathy Zeiger (Ind.)	Terry James (Unity)	Richie Bates (Unity/Ind.)	Linda Cooper (Ind.)	Max O'Halloran (Unity)	Jessie Richardson (Unity)	Brett Olds (Ind. LNP/Ind.)	9 wards (2014−present)
2017	Brett Moller (Unity)	John Schilling (Unity)	Cathy Zeiger (Ind.)	Terry James (Unity)	Richie Bates (Unity/Ind.)	Linda Cooper (Ind.)	Max O'Halloran (Unity)	Jessie Richardson (Unity)	Brett Olds (Ind. LNP/Ind.)	9 wards (2014−present)
2020	Brett Moller (Unity)	Rob Pyne (Ind. Socialist/ Ind. Socialist Alliance)	Cathy Zeiger (Ind.)	Terry James (Unity)	Amy Eden (Unity/Team Eden)	Kristy Vallely (Unity)	Max O'Halloran (Unity)	Rhonda Coghlan (Unity)	Brett Olds (Ind. LNP/Ind.)	9 wards (2014−present)
2020	Brett Moller (Unity)	Rob Pyne (Ind. Socialist/ Ind. Socialist Alliance)	Cathy Zeiger (Ind.)	Terry James (Unity)	Amy Eden (Unity/Team Eden)	Kristy Vallely (Unity)	Max O'Halloran (Unity)	Rhonda Coghlan (Unity)	Brett Olds (Ind. LNP/Ind.)	9 wards (2014−present)
2021	Brett Moller (Unity)	Rob Pyne (Ind. Socialist/ Ind. Socialist Alliance)	Cathy Zeiger (Ind.)	Terry James (Unity)	Amy Eden (Unity/Team Eden)	Kristy Vallely (Unity)	Max O'Halloran (Unity)	Rhonda Coghlan (Unity)	Brett Olds (Ind. LNP/Ind.)	9 wards (2014−present)
2023	Brett Moller (Unity)	Rob Pyne (Ind. Socialist/ Ind. Socialist Alliance)	Cathy Zeiger (Ind.)	Terry James (Unity)	Amy Eden (Unity/Team Eden)	Kristy Vallely (Unity)	Max O'Halloran (Unity)	Rhonda Coghlan (Unity)	Brett Olds (Ind. LNP/Ind.)	9 wards (2014−present)
2024a	Brett Moller (Unity)	Rob Pyne (Ind. Socialist/ Ind. Socialist Alliance)	Cathy Zeiger (Ind.)	Jeremy Neal (Unity)	Amy Eden (Unity/Team Eden)	Kristy Vallely (Unity)	Max O'Halloran (Unity)	Rhonda Coghlan (Unity)	Brett Olds (Ind. LNP/Ind.)	9 wards (2014−present)
2024	Brett Moller (Unity)	Matthew Tickner (Ind. LNP)	Cathy Zeiger (Ind.)	Trevor Tim (Team Eden)	Rob Pyne (QLD Socialists)	Kristy Vallely (Unity)	Anna Middleton (Ind.)	Rhonda Coghlan (Unity)	Brett Olds (Ind. LNP/Ind.)	9 wards (2014−present)
2024b	Brett Moller (Unity)	Matthew Tickner (Ind. LNP)	Cathy Zeiger (Ind.)	Trevor Tim (Team Eden)	Rob Pyne (QLD Socialists)	Kristy Vallely (Unity)	Anna Middleton (Ind.)	Rhonda Coghlan (Unity)	Brett Olds (Ind. LNP/Ind.)	9 wards (2014−present)
2026	Brett Moller (Unity)	Matthew Tickner (Ind. LNP)	Cathy Zeiger (Ind.)	Trevor Tim (Team Eden)	Rob Pyne (QLD Socialists)	Kristy Vallely (Unity)	Anna Middleton (Ind.)	Rhonda Coghlan (Unity)	Brett Olds (Ind. LNP/Ind.)	9 wards (2014−present)

== Election results ==
=== 2024 ===
2024 Queensland local elections: Cairns
Party	Votes	%	Swing	Seats	Change
Cairns Unity				3	▼2
Independent				3	▲1
Team Eden				1	Steady
Independent LNP				1	▲1
Independent Socialist Alliance				1	Steady
Community First				0	Steady
Independent Labor				0	Steady
Independent Democratic				0	Steady
