= Aboriginal Shire of Yarrabah =

Coordinates: 16°55′14″S 145°52′21″E

- Local government area
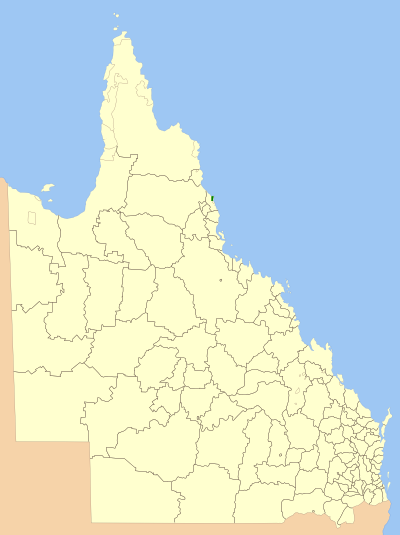
- Location within Queensland

- Interactive map of Aboriginal Shire of Yarrabah
- Country: Australia
- State: Queensland
- Region: Far North
- Established: 1987
- Council seat: Yarrabah

Government
  - Mayor: Ross Andrews
  - State electorate: Mulgrave
  - Federal division: Kennedy

Area
  - Total: 159 km^{2} (61 sq mi)

Population
  - Total: 2,505 (2021 census)
  - Density: 15.75/km^{2} (40.80/sq mi)
- Website: Aboriginal Shire of Yarrabah
LGAs around Aboriginal Shire of Yarrabah
| Cairns | Coral Sea | Coral Sea |
| Cairns | Aboriginal Shire of Yarrabah | Coral Sea |
| Cairns | Cairns | Cairns |

The Aboriginal Shire of Yarrabah is a special local government area in Far North Queensland, Queensland, Australia, east and southeast of Cairns on Cape Grafton. It is managed under a Deed of Grant in Trust under the Local Government (Community Government Areas) Act 2004.

In the 2021 census, the Aboriginal Shire of Yarrabah had a population of 2,505 people.

== History ==
The area originally was set up as an Anglican Mission in 1892. Aboriginal people from the region were gradually drawn or relocated from their traditional lands into the mission settlement. The Gungganydji people were the main group to be settled there.

In the 1960s, the Anglican Church relinquished control of the mission. The Department of Aboriginal and Islander Affairs, a government department, under the Act continued running the affairs of the community.

On 29 October 1987, under the Community Services (Aborigines) Act 1984, a Deed of Grant in Trust was given to the Yarrabah community over the Cape Grafton area. Like other DOGIT communities of the time, Yarrabah had a Community Council elected by Aboriginal people living in the community.

== Demographics ==
In the 2016 census, the Aboriginal Shire of Yarrabah had a population of 2,559 people.

In the 2021 census, the Aboriginal Shire of Yarrabah had a population of 2,505 people.

== Responsibilities ==
As the Shire is not operated under the Local Government Act and operates the land on behalf of the community, the Shire Council's responsibilities are quite different from a typical local government body. This includes responsibility for fisheries, alcohol management and employment initiatives.

The Yarrabah Aboriginal Shire Council operates an Indigenous Knowledge Centre at Noble Drive in Yarrabah.

== Mayors ==
- 2004–2008: Vincent Mundraby
- 2008–2012: Percy Conrad Neal
- 2012–2016 : Errol Neal
- 2016–present: Ross James Andrews

== See also ==
- Yarrabah, Queensland
