= Mulgrave River =

River in Queensland, Australia

Mulgrave
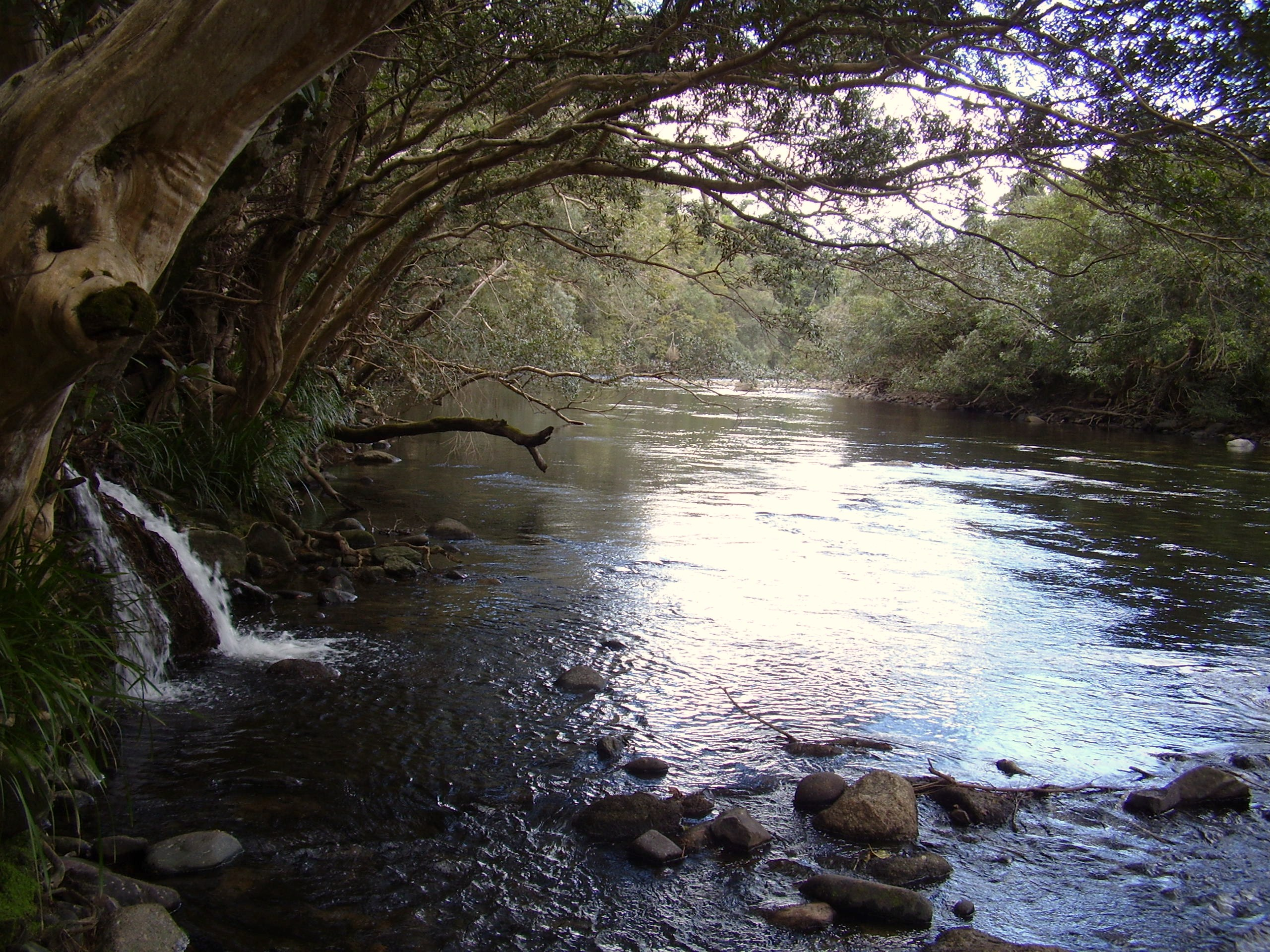
- The Mulgrave River in the Goldsbrough Valley

- Location of Mulgrave River river mouth in Queensland

Location
- Country: Australia
- State: Queensland
- Region: Far North Queensland

Physical characteristics
- Source: Bellenden Ker Range
- 2nd source: West Mulgrave River
  - location: west of Babinda
  - coordinates: 17°21′16″S 145°46′52″E
  - elevation: 376 m (1,234 ft)
- 3rd source: East Mulgrave River
  - location: below South Peak
  - coordinates: 17°17′37″S 145°51′00″E
  - elevation: 665 m (2,182 ft)
- Source confluence: West and East branches of the Mulgrave River
  - location: south of Little Mulgrave
  - coordinates: 17°17′50″S 145°48′01″E
  - elevation: 120 m (390 ft)
- Mouth: Coral Sea
  - location: Mutchero Inlet
  - coordinates: 17°13′18″S 145°58′30″E
  - elevation: 0 m (0 ft)
- Length: 70 km (43 mi)
- Basin size: 1,315 km^{2} (508 sq mi)
- Discharge
  - location: Near mouth
  - average: 86.4 m^{3}/s (2,730 GL/a)

Basin features
- Tributaries
  - right: Russell River
- National parks: Wooroonooran National Park; Russell River National Park

The Mulgrave River, incorporating the East Mulgrave River and the West Mulgrave River, is a river system in Far North Queensland, Australia. The 70-kilometre (43 mi)-long river flows towards the Coral Sea and is located approximately 50 kilometres (31 mi) south of Cairns.

== Location and features ==
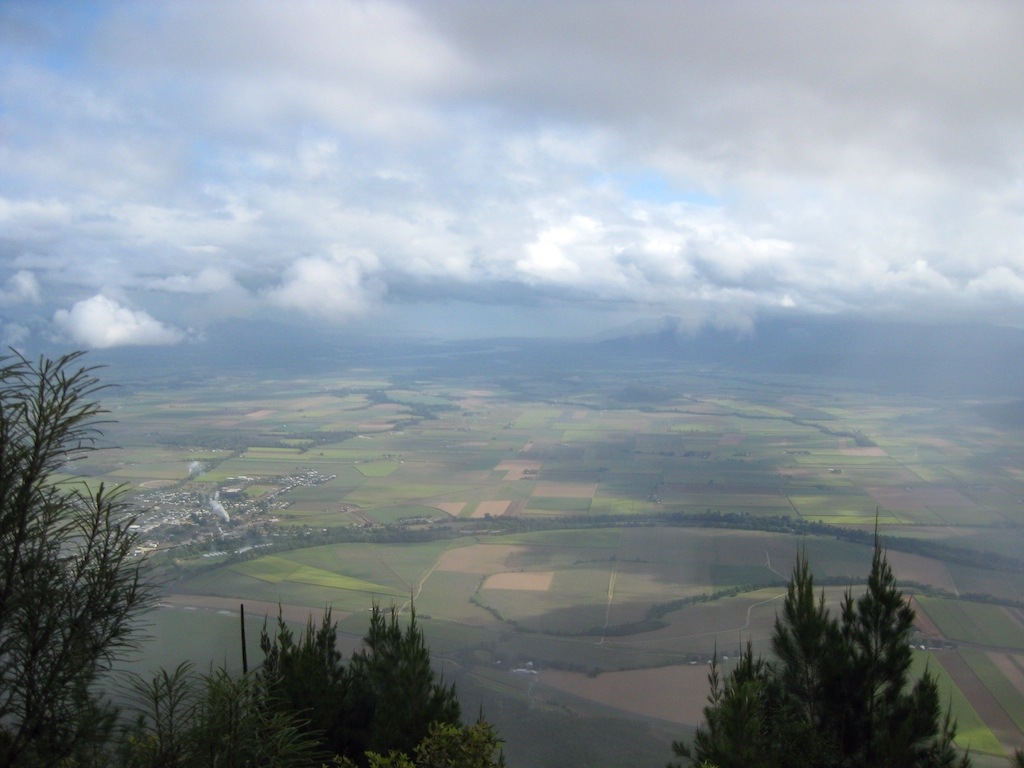
Catchment of the Mulgrave River southeast of Gordonvale

Sourced by runoff from the Bellenden Ker Range, the headwaters of the Mulgrave River rise as the east and west branches of the river below South Peak and west of Babinda, respectively. The two branches form their confluence within the Wooroonooran National Park and the Wet Tropics World Heritage Area. The Mulgrave River flows generally north towards Little Mulgrave, through the outskirts of Gordonvale, and continues through the Goldsborough Valley. From Gordonvale, the river flows east by south and then south, eventually emptying into the Coral Sea 30 kilometres (19 mi) south at the southern extremity of the Yarrabah Hills range, where it meets the Russell River. The Trinity Inlet was once the river mouth of the Mulgrave River. Volcanic activity that resulted in the rise of Green Hill in the Mulgrave Valley blocked the river from entering the sea near present-day Cairns. However, further research has shown river sediments above the basalt flows, suggesting that other factors, such as alluvial sediments, may have altered the river's course, possibly causing it to alternate between the two mouths over time.

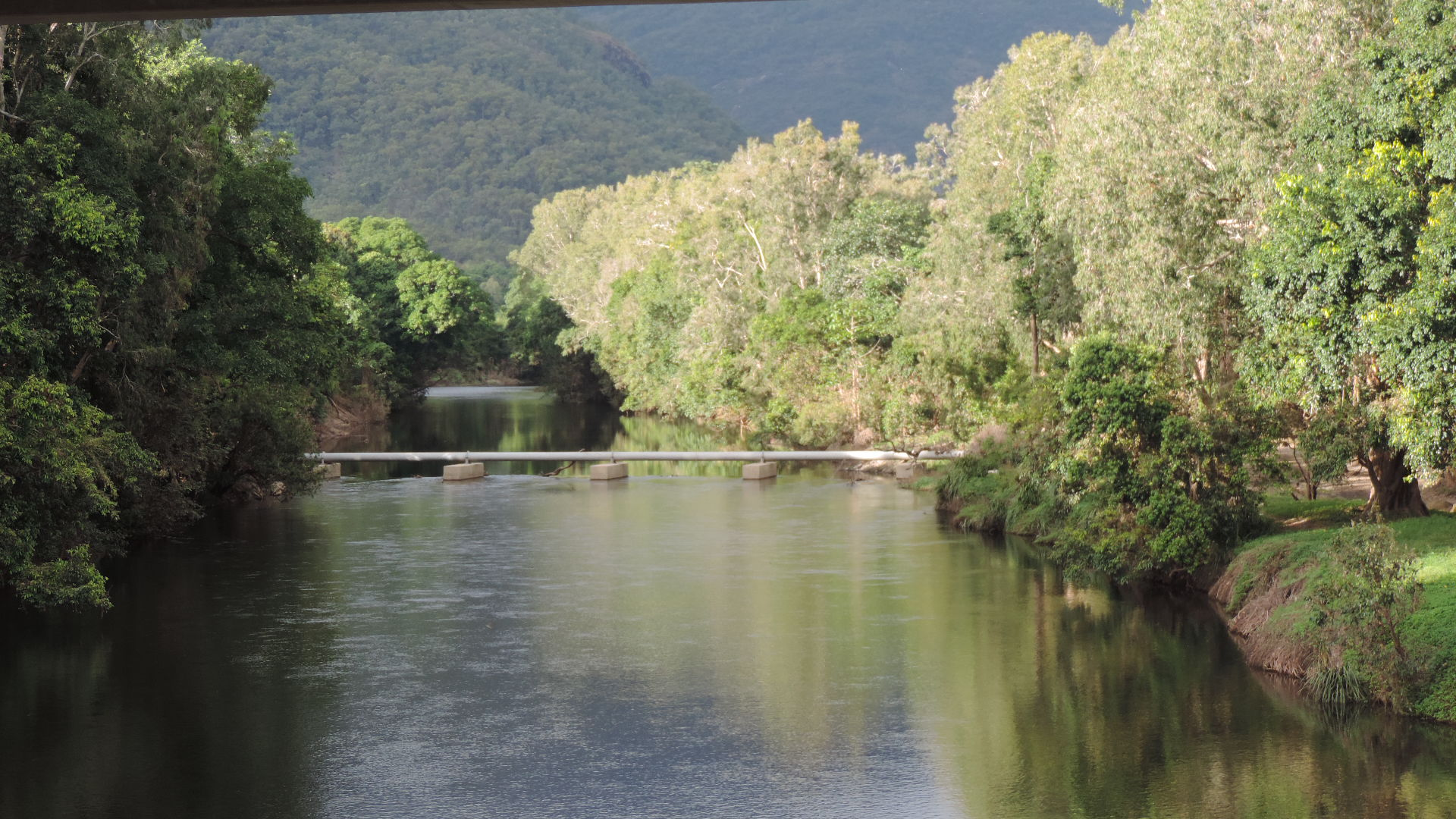
Looking upstream on the Mulgrave River from under the Desmond Trannore Bridge, 2018

The river has a catchment area of 1,315 square kilometres (508 sq mi). From source to mouth, incorporating the east and west branches of the river, the river descends 665 metres (2,182 ft) over a combined 78-kilometre (48 mi) course.

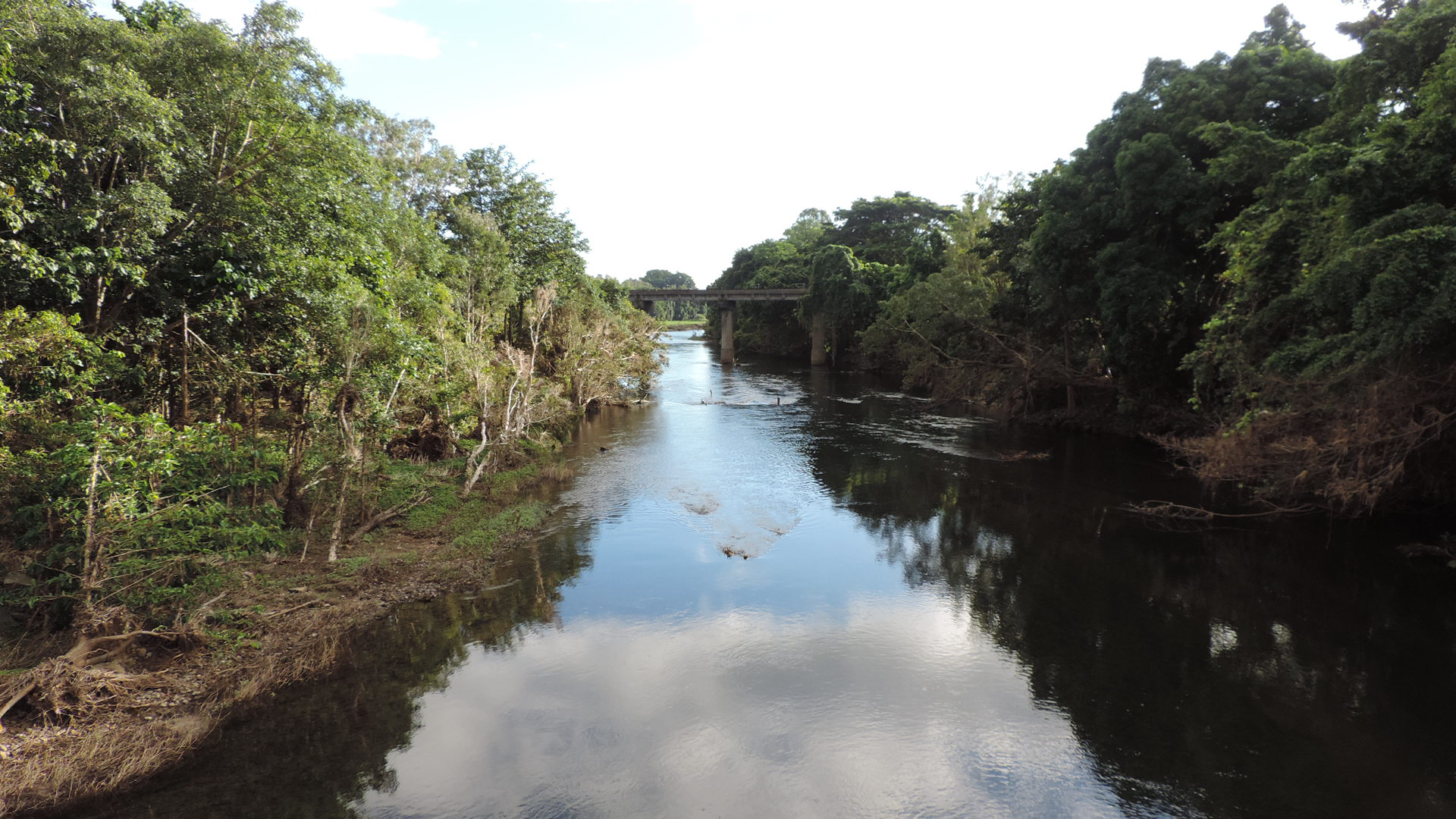
Looking downstream along the Mulgrave River from the Desmond Trannore bridge, 2018

The river is crossed by the Bruce Highway south of Gordonvale via the Desmond Trannore Bridge.

== History ==
Gold was discovered in the river in the 1870s, bringing considerable change to the Goldsborough Valley. Gravel is now extracted from the riverbed.

Together with the Russell River, the Mulgrave River has a well-recorded flood history with documented evidence of flooding beginning in the late 19th century.

== Fauna ==
Freshwater stonefish and crocodiles are found in the river, so caution is advised if swimming in the river. The pest fish tilapia have been discovered in the river and have been the target of eradication efforts.

== Language ==
Yidinji (also known as Yidinj, Yidiny, and Idindji) is an Australian Aboriginal language. Its traditional language region is within the local government areas of Cairns Region and Tablelands Region, in such localities as Cairns, Gordonvale, and the Mulgrave River, and the southern part of the Atherton Tableland including Atherton and Kairi.

== See also ==
- Kearneys Falls
- List of rivers of Australia § Queensland
