= List of mayors of Cairns =

Mayor of Cairns
- Incumbent; Amy Eden since 16 March 2024
- Inaugural holder: Richard Ash Kingsford
- Formation: 1885

The City of Cairns, in Far North Queensland, was originally established as a borough with a chairman from 1885 until 1903, when the Local Authorities Act 1902 transformed it into a town with a mayor. The town achieved city status in 1923. In 1995, when the Shire of Mulgrave amalgamated into the City, the mayor was elected by a much larger base of voters. In 2008, when the City was amalgamated with the Shire of Douglas into the Cairns Region, the mayor's voter base expanded yet again.

== Borough of Cairns (1885–1903) ==
The mayors of the Borough of Cairns were:

Chairman	Term	Notes
Richard Ash Kingsford	1885–1886	
Louis Severin	1886–1888	
Richard Ash Kingsford	1889	
Callaghan Walsh	1890	
Louis Severin	1891	
Alexander Frederick John "AJ" Draper	1891–1893	
Daniel Patience	1893–1894	
James Lyons	1895–1896	
AJ Draper	1897	
Karl Aumuller	1898	
Lyne Brown	1899	
Richard Alfred Tills	1900–1901	
AJ Draper	1902	

== Town of Cairns (1903–1923) ==
The mayors of the Town of Cairns were:

Mayor	Term
Louis Severin	1903
Donald McLachlan	1904
Charles McKenzie	1905
Edward Earl	1906
Richard Alfred Tills	1907
Sinclair Miller	1908
John Coxall	1909
Andrew Hartill-Law	1910
John George Hoare	1911
Charles McKenzie	1912–1913
Thomas Dillon	1914
John Griffiths	1915
Thomas Dillon	1915–1916
Thomas Henry Donaldson	1917
AJ Draper	1918–1919
Richard Cowle Foxdale Gelling	1919
John George Hoare	1920–1923

== City of Cairns Council (1923–1995) ==
The mayors of the City of Cairns (prior to amalgamation) were:

Mayor	Term	Notes
John George Hoare	1923–1924	
AJ Draper	1924–1927	
William Aloysius Collins	1927–1949	
William Henry Murchison	1949–1952	
Bill Fulton	1952–1960	
S. Darcy Chataway	1960–1967	
Colin Penridge	1967–1969	
David Thomas De Jarlais	1969–1973	
Kevin Francis Crathern	1973–1978	
Ronald (Ron) Davis	1979–1988	
Keith Goodwin	1988–1990	
John Peter Cleland	1990–1991	
Kevin Byrne	1992–1995	

== City of Cairns Council (Amalgamated) (1995–2008) ==
The mayors of the City of Cairns (following amalgamation):

Mayor	Term
Tom Pyne	1995–2000
Kevin Byrne	2000–2008

== Cairns Regional Council ==
=== 2008–present ===
No.	Portrait	Mayor	Party	Term start	Term end	Notes	Council control (term)
1		Val Schier	Independent	3 April 2008	28 April 2012	First female mayor of Cairns. Lost re-election	Independents majority (2008–2012)
2		Bob Manning	Unity	28 April 2012	17 November 2023	Retired	Unity majority (2012–2024)
3		Terry James	Unity	22 November 2023	16 March 2024	Division 4 councillor 2012–2023. Lost re-election	Unity majority (2012–2024)
4		Amy Eden	Team Eden	16 March 2024	present	Division 5 councillor 2020–2024. Incumbent	No overall control (2024–present)

== Election results ==
=== 2024 ===
2024 Queensland mayoral elections: Cairns
Party	Candidate	Votes	%	±%
Team Eden	Amy Eden	25,782	30.70	+30.70
Cairns Unity	Terry James	20,187	24.04	−42.93
Independent	Paul Taylor	19,532	23.26	+23.26
Community First	Denis Walls	10,745	12.79	+12.79
Independent	John Kel	3,854	4.59	+4.59
Independent	Leah Potter	2,747	3.27	+3.27
Independent	Warren Binda	1,139	1.36	+1.36
Turnout		88,650	75.39	+4.83
Two-candidate-preferred result
Team Eden	Amy Eden	30,364	56.64	+56.64
Cairns Unity	Terry James	23,242	43.36	−37.89
Team Eden gain from Cairns Unity		Swing	N/A	

=== 2020 ===
2020 Queensland mayoral elections: Cairns
Party	Candidate	Votes	%	±%
Cairns Unity	Bob Manning	47,171	66.97	
Independent	Georgia Babatsikos	8,161	11.59	
Independent LNP	Ian Lydiard	7,837	11.13	
Cairns N.Q.S.A. Team	Jen Sackley	7,266	10.32	
Turnout		73,850	70.56	
Two-candidate-preferred result
Cairns Unity	Bob Manning	49,048	81.25	
Independent	Georgia Babatsikos	11,320	18.75	
Cairns Unity hold		Swing		

=== 1933 ===
1933 Queensland mayoral elections: Cairns
Party	Candidate	Votes	%	±%
Independent	William Aloysius Collins	unopposed		
Independent hold		Swing		
