= Bob Manning (mayor) =

Australian politician

Bob Manning OAM

Mayor of Cairns
- In office 28 April 2012 – 17 November 2023
- Preceded by: Val Schier
- Succeeded by: Terry James

Leader of Cairns Unity
- In office 18 January 2012 – 17 November 2023
- Preceded by: Party established
- Succeeded by: Terry James

Personal details
- Born: Robert Charles Manning; 16 October 1945 (age 80) Cairns, Queensland
- Party: Cairns Unity
- Spouse: Claire Manning
- Children: 2
- Education: Edge Hill State School; Cairns State High School
- Alma mater: University of Southern Queensland

Military service
- Allegiance: Australia
- Branch/service: Australian Army
- Years of service: c. 1968 – 1971
- Rank: (Temporary) Lieutenant
- Unit: Royal Australian Army Medical Corps
- Battles/wars: Vietnam War (1970 – 1971)
- Service number: 1734304

Robert Charles Manning OAM (born 16 October 1945) is an Australian former politician who served as mayor of Cairns from 2012 until his resignation in 2023.

== Early life ==
Manning was born in Cairns, and attended Edge Hill State School, and Cairns State High School. He graduated with a Bachelor of Business (Accounting) from the University of Southern Queensland. Manning served three years in the Australian Army including service in the Vietnam War from 1970 to 1971.

== Career ==
Manning's first major position was as CEO of the Longreach Shire Council for eight years. In 1984 he returned to Cairns and became Secretary and then CEO of the Cairns Port Authority (including the Cairns Airport) for eighteen years from 1984 to 2002. After resigning his role at the port as a stand against "bullying tactics" by the Queensland Government, Manning began consulting work in Jordan and South Korea. In 2004 Manning became the General Manager of NQEA Australia Pty Ltd before heading overseas again to take up the role of CEO of Hermes Airports Ltd (including Larnaca International Airport and Paphos International Airport) in Cyprus until 2008.

He has had a lengthy involvement with the Airports Council International from 1993 to 2000 (including president, vice-president and vice-chairman) and was the director/chairman of Tourism Tropical North Queensland (previously Far North Queensland Promotion Bureau) for eleven years from 1986 to 1997.

In 2012, Manning purchased nationally acclaimed company Events NQ. In February 2015, Events NQ was put into liquidation, with staff left without their entitlements and creditors unpaid.

=== Mayor ===
In January 2012, Manning announced his intention to run for mayor of Cairns at the upcoming local government elections with a team of candidates under the name "Unity 2012". Kevin Byrne, a former mayor, had previously run his team under the banner of "Cairns Unity Team". Manning considered the Unity 2012 team to be apolitical and publicly stated that Unity 2012 had no political affiliation.

Manning was successful, being elected with 55.61% of the vote. Following his victory, he borrowed $150,000 the following year from a developer lobbyist while he was facing bankruptcy — which would have automatically disqualified him from office. Queensland’s Crime and Corruption Commission (CCC) launched an investigation in February, after the state’s local government watchdog referred the matter as potential corrupt conduct. The lender was Ranjit Singh, a lawyer representing developers in some of Cairns biggest building projects. Authorities found the loan was interest-free, never formally documented and has not been repaid.

Manning announced his resignation, effective immediately, on 17 November 2023. He was replaced by deputy mayor Terry James.

== Family and personal life ==
Manning is married to Claire Manning and they have two grown children, Mark and Belinda. Bob Manning's father founded Manning's Pies, a local pie shop.

== Awards ==
In 2002 Manning was awarded Cairns Citizen of the Year.

In 2004 he was awarded the Medal of the Order of Australia for "service to the community of the Cairns region through the development and promotion of the tourism, maritime and aviation industries".
