= Kevin Byrne (mayor) =

Australian politician (1949–2023)

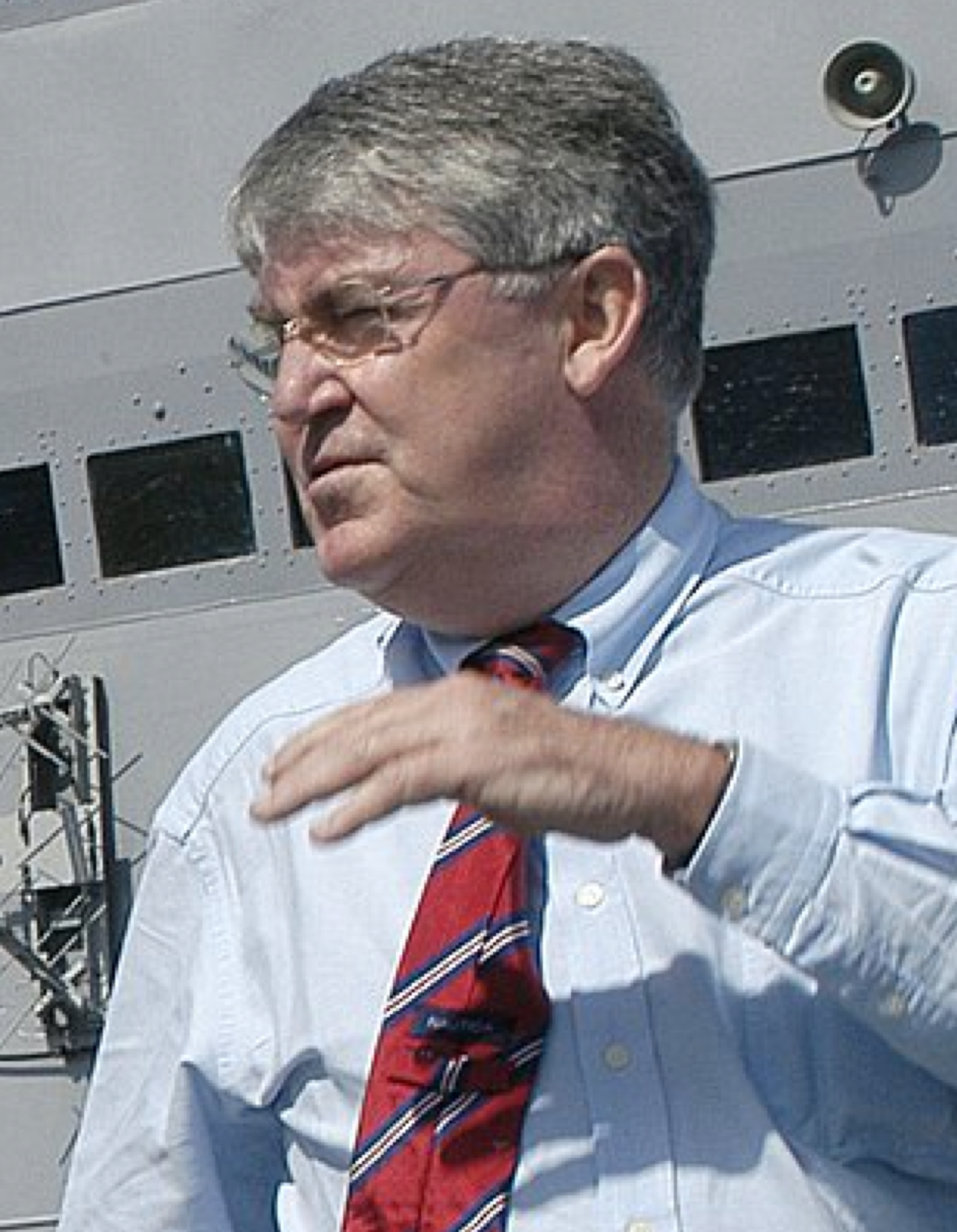

Mayor of Cairns
- In office 25 March 2000 – 3 April 2008
- Preceded by: Tom Pyne
- Succeeded by: Val Schier
- In office 1992 – 11 March 1995
- Succeeded by: Tom Pyne

Personal details
- Born: Kevin Michael Byrne; 1949 Lae, Territory of New Guinea
- Died: 21 September 2023 (aged 74)
- Spouse: Amanda Byrne
- Education: St Joseph's College, Nudgee
- Alma mater: OCS Portsea; Kensington University
- Civilian awards: Papua New Guinea Independence Medal (2000); Australian Centenary Medal (2001)

Military service
- Allegiance: Australia
- Branch/service: Australian Army
- Years of service: 1969–1987
- Commands: Senior Instructor at the Royal Military College, Duntroon
- Military awards: Sword of Honour for Leadership (OCS Portsea, 1969)

Kevin Michael Byrne (1949 – 21 September 2023) was an Australian politician who served as mayor of Cairns from 1992 to 1995 and then again from 2000 to 2008.

== Early life ==
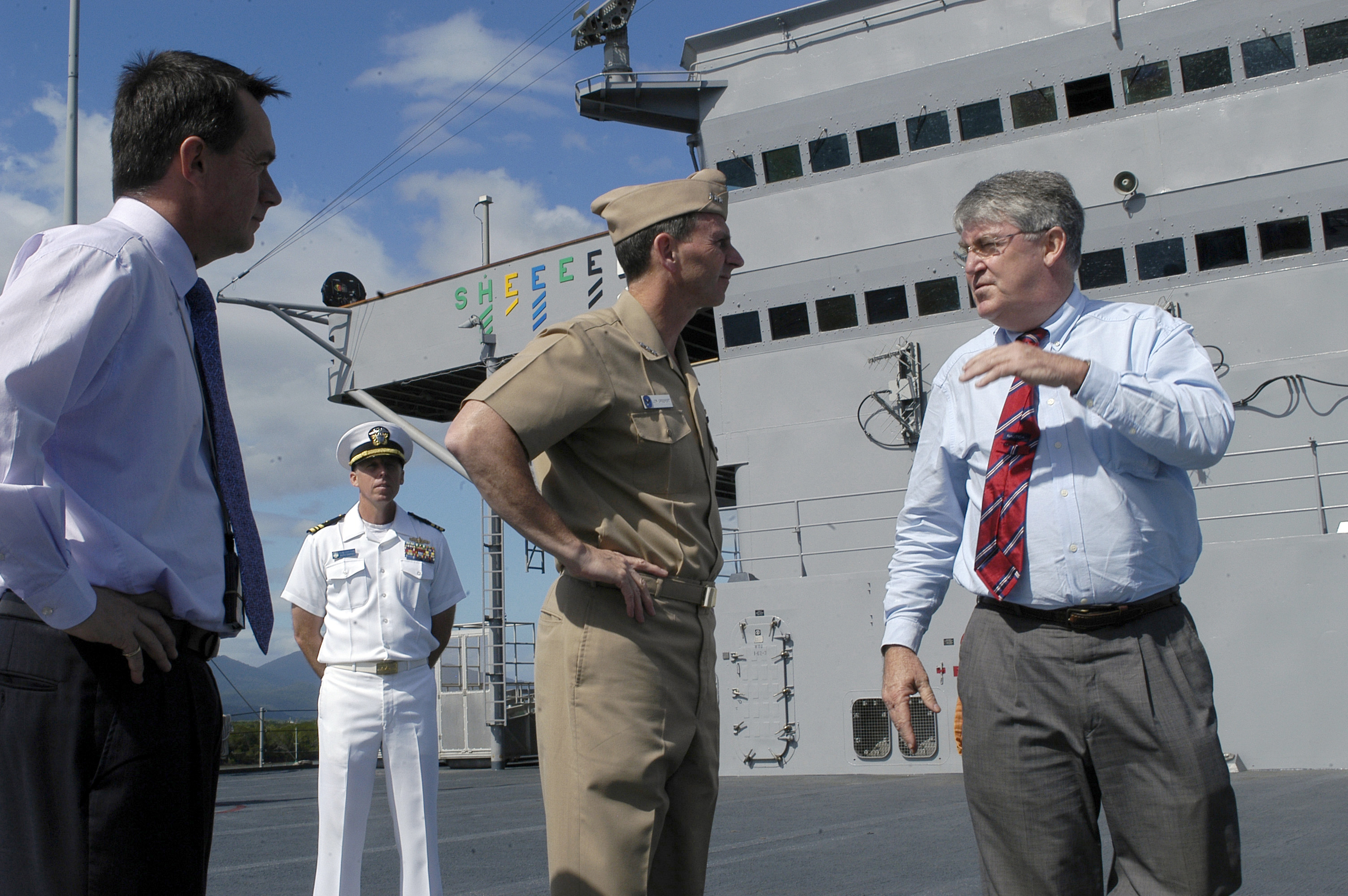
Bryrne (right) speaking with Jonathan Greenert on the main deck aboard the amphibious command ship USS Blue Ridge (LCC 19)

Kevin Michael Byrne was born in Lae in 1949. His family had first arrived in Papua New Guinea in 1906 when his grandfather was appointed Chief Collector of Customs in Port Moresby. His primary education was on Manus Island, Papua New Guinea and he attended Nudgee College, Brisbane from 1963 until 1967.

== Military career ==
Byrne graduated in 1969 from Officer Cadet School, Portsea, Victoria (OCS Portsea) with an Australian Army commission. He was awarded the Sword of Honour for Leadership in that year. His 17-year military career included Australian and overseas postings to Malaysia, Singapore, Papua New Guinea, Rhodesia and South Vietnam. His final military assignment was as a Senior Instructor at the Royal Military College, Duntroon, 1987.

== Professional life ==
Byrne served as the regional manager in the Office of Northern and Regional Development, Cairns, between 1987 and 1990. In 1990 he became the regional manager of the Queensland Confederation of Industry.

Byrne was elected Mayor of Cairns in 1992; and re-elected in 1994. In 1995, he was defeated by Tom Pyne.

Byrne served as the Administrative Director for an oil spill cleanup operation, funded by the World Bank and European Bank of Reconstruction and Development, in the Kolva Basin, in the Komi Republic, part of the Russian Federation. The Pechora River tributaries were remediated and 146,000 tonnes (161,000 short tons) of oil were recovered.

In December 1995, Byrne was appointed the Chief Executive of the Papua New Guinea Tourism Promotion Authority. He was a member of the national negotiating team for bilateral air service agreements; the acting chairman of the National Airline Commission for two years; deputy chairman of Air Niugini for eighteen months; and a national delegate to the APEC Working Groups on Tourism and Trade.

In December 1999, Byrne returned to Cairns; and was re-elected as Mayor of Cairns on 25 March 2000 and again in March 2004. In 2008 he was defeated by Val Schier for the position of mayor of the Cairns Regional Council.

== Controversy ==
Byrne was the subject of media attention and controversy for involvement with property developers, attitudes towards racial issues, and his approach to government and the electorate. Some examples of the allegations include:

Allegations of racism

An aborted attempt by the Byrne Council to secretly bus indigenous people from the Cairns region to the remote Lockhart River region.

Contravened electoral policies

Allegations (and subsequent referral to the Crime and Misconduct Commission) by a local ratepayers group that he contravened electoral and ethical policies by maintaining an undeclared involvement in other primary businesses during his mayoralty.

Close ties with developers

A self-acknowledged perception that he was 'in the developers pockets', ultimately attributed by him as the reason for his defeat in 2008. Three months later he accepted employment as a senior director with a Cairns property developer. Tragically, the managing director of the company was later murdered and the company went into receivership.

Ethical misconduct by his wife

An investigation of Lady Mayoress Amanda Byrne for ethical misconduct under the terms of the Property Agents and Motor Dealers Act 2000 (PAMD Act). She was ultimately found guilty of charges by the office of fair trading and, in a move unprecedented in Queensland, she was banned for life from practising as an accommodation manager.

Ignoring disaster risk advice

That advice from government environmental body Geoscience Australia that warned of a serious disaster risk in approving new development on the Cairns slopes and some low-lying areas was set-aside in favour of more favourable reports from the Council's own engineers.

=== Higher education ===
Byrne claimed formal qualifications from Kensington University. Located in Glendale, California, Kensington was an unaccredited distance education provider that was shut down by state authorities there after the state Council for Private Postsecondary and Vocational Education found that "little or no rigor or credible academic standards are necessary in order to be awarded an advanced degree at Kensington University." The attributed qualification is a Master of Arts (Business Administration and Management) with GPA 4, granted in 1993 by Kensington University.

== Death ==
Kevin Byrne died on 21 September 2023, aged 74.

== Awards ==
In 2000 Byrne was awarded the Papua New Guinea Independence Medal (25th Anniversary) for services to Aviation and Tourism; and the Australian Centenary Medal for services to Local Government, in 2001.
