= Local government in Queensland =

Types of LGAs in Queensland since 2014: Red=Aboriginal Shires Green=Cities Yellow=Regions Orange=Shires Purple=Town

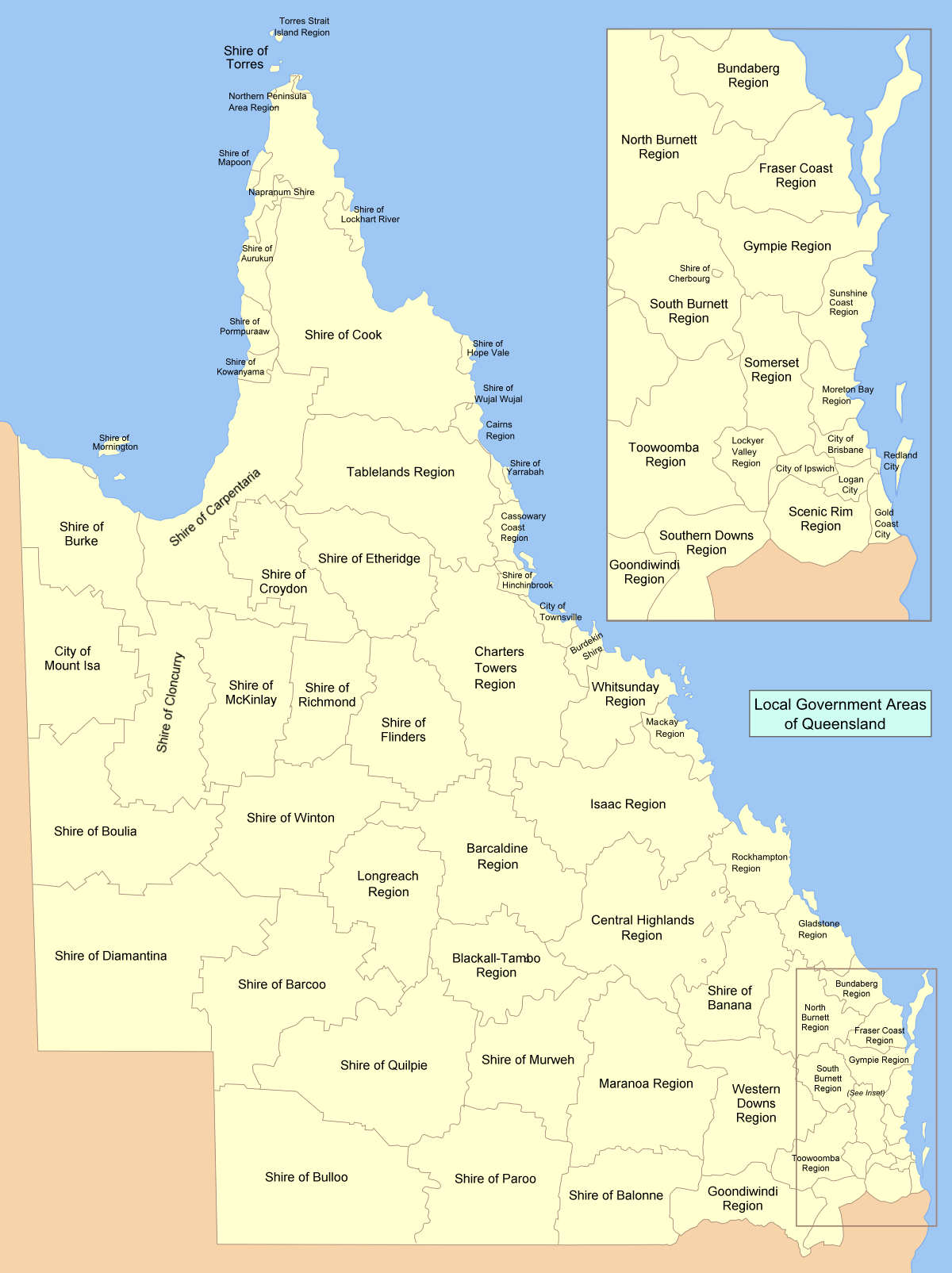
Map of local government areas in Queensland, 2008–2013

Local government in Queensland, Australia, includes the institutions and processes by which towns and districts can manage their own affairs to the extent permitted by the Local Government Act 1993–2007. Queensland is divided into 78 local government areas, which may be called Cities, Towns, Shires, or Regions. Each area has a council that is responsible for providing a range of public services and utilities and derives its income from both rates and charges on resident ratepayers and grants and subsidies from the state and Commonwealth governments.

As bodies which obtain their legitimacy from an Act of the Queensland Parliament, local councils are subordinate rather than sovereign entities and can be created, amalgamated, abolished, or dismissed by the state at will. In modern practice, however, decisions on such matters are made in response to recommendations by independent Reform Commissions, such as the Electoral and Administrative Reform Commission (1990–1993) and the Local Government Reform Commission (2007). Recent reforms, which took effect on 15 March 2008, resulted in over 70% of Queensland's local government areas being amalgamated into larger entities and generated a considerable degree of controversy, even attracting national interest in the context of a federal election campaign.

As a result of Queensland and New South Wales local government amalgamations, Australia's three largest-by-population local government areas are all in Queensland:

Rank	Local government area	Population (2018)	Population (2021)
1	City of Brisbane	1,231,605	1,242,825
2	City of Gold Coast	606,774	625,087
3	City of Moreton Bay	459,585	476,340

== History and development ==
=== Early history ===
The first example of local government in the Queensland area came before the separation of Queensland from New South Wales. The Municipalities Act 1858 allowed for the creation of a municipality upon the petition of not less than 50 householders within a defined area. If no counter-petition with more signatures was received, the governor was able to declare a municipality in the region. Two types of municipalities were possible under the act: boroughs, which had a minimum population of 1,000, a maximum area of 9 sq mi (23.3 km^{2}) and no two parts being more than 6 miles (9.66 km) apart; and municipal districts, with a minimum population of 500 and a maximum area of 50 sq mi (129.5 km^{2}). Once a municipality had been proclaimed, ratepayers could elect a council to represent them.

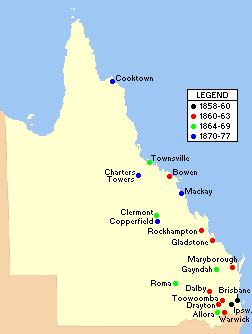
Municipalities created in Queensland, 1858–77

The first to be declared was Brisbane, with a population of 5,000 and an area of 14.25 square kilometres (5.5 sq mi). Its first attempt in January 1859 was unsuccessful due to a counter-petition, but its second attempt with 420 signatories was gazetted on 25 May 1859 and proclaimed by the Governor of New South Wales on 7 September 1859. On 16 November, a petition containing 91 signatures was received seeking to have Ipswich, which had 3,000 people, granted municipal town status. On 29 November, the letters patent authorised by Queen Victoria, which were to make Queensland a separate colony, were published in New South Wales, and the petition was forwarded to the new Queensland governor, Sir George Ferguson Bowen. On 10 December 1859, the same day that the letters patent were published in Queensland, the petition was regazetted. On 3 March 1860, the Town of Ipswich was proclaimed.

Following this, eight other councils obtained municipality status under the act: Toowoomba (19 November 1860), Rockhampton (13 December 1860), Maryborough (23 March 1861), Warwick (25 May 1861), Drayton (1862), Gladstone (20 February 1863), Bowen (7 August 1863) and Dalby (21 August 1863).

By 1879, almost all of Queensland was under some form of local administration, either as a municipality under the Local Government Act 1878 or as a division under the Divisional Boards Act 1879.

=== Municipal Institutions Act ===
In September 1864, the first comprehensive Queensland local government legislation, the Municipal Institutions Act 1864, was enacted, repealing the previous Act. The Act allowed municipalities to charge rates, borrow money, enact bylaws, control or regulate public infrastructure and utilities, and provide public amenities such as gardens and hospitals.

The system for creating new municipalities was redesigned. Firstly, a signed petition had to be presented to the Governor from a minimum of 100 householders to create a new district or divide an existing one, or a minimum of 50 householders to extend an existing district to cover a neighbouring rural area. Once this had been done, the Governor could proclaim the change, and residents could then elect a council to represent them. Any man over the age of 21 who was a tenant, occupier, landlord, or proprietor within the municipality could vote, and they were entitled to between one and three votes depending on the level of rates they paid. Only qualified voters could stand for council elections, conducted annually, with one-third of the councillors retiring at each election. Once the council was elected, they selected a mayor from among their number. For the first time, municipalities could be divided into wards upon their own request—from two wards for a population under 1,000 to four wards for a population over 5,000.

During the 14 years that the Act was in force, the Drayton municipality was abolished in 1875, and nine new municipalities were created: Townsville (15 February 1866), Gayndah (28 November 1866), Clermont (21 January 1867), Roma (21 May 1867), Allora (21 July 1869), Mackay (22 September 1869), Copperfield (10 May 1872), Cooktown (3 April 1876) and Charters Towers (21 June 1877).

=== The dual system ===
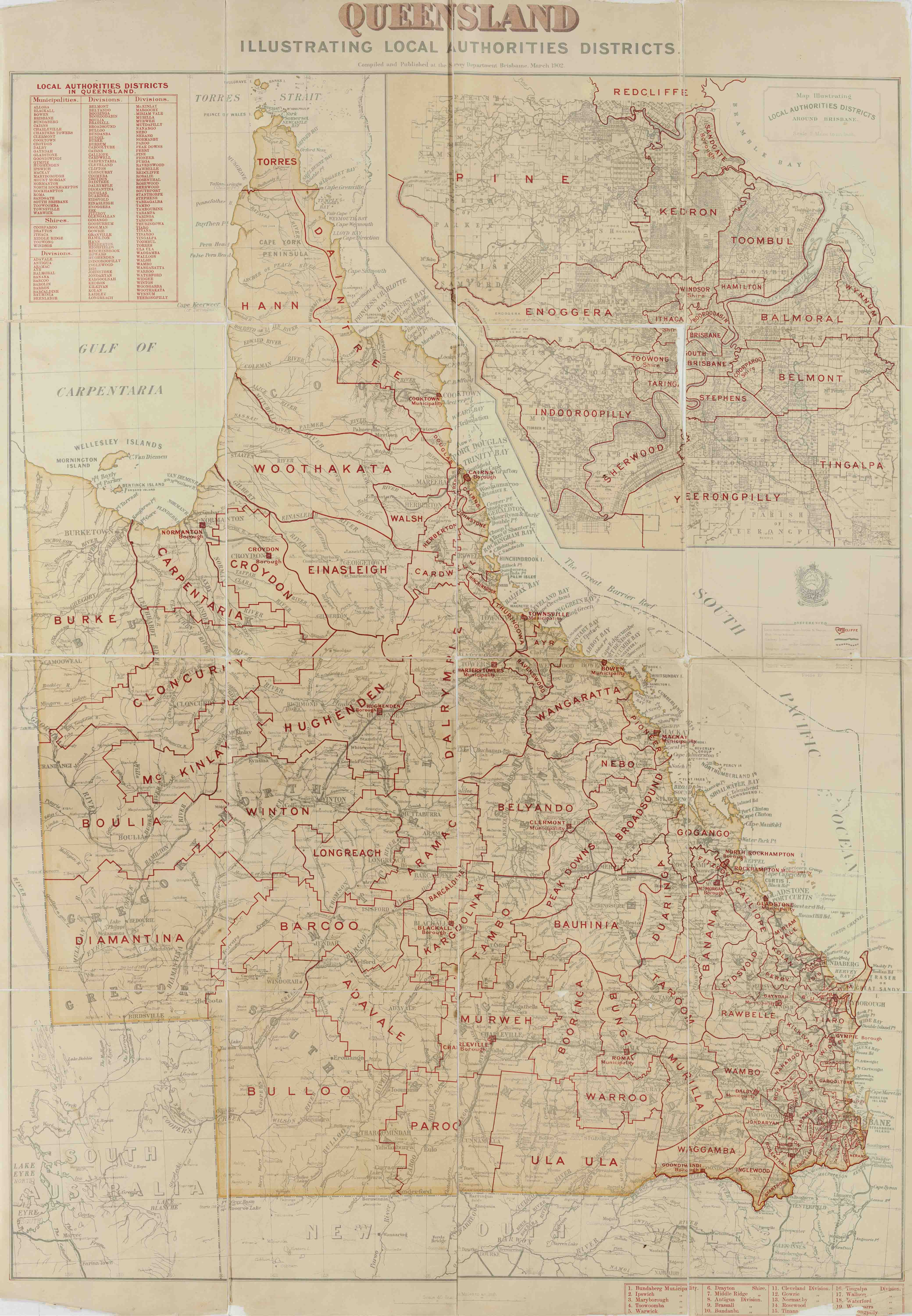
Map of local government divisions in Queensland, 1902

The Queensland Government passed the Local Government Act 1878 in August of that year. According to the act, the function of municipal councils was to maintain "the good rule and government of the municipality" and to provide public services and amenities. Examples of such anticipated by the act included parks and reserves, libraries, cemeteries, water and sanitation services, roads, bridges, wharves, street lighting, public health, fire prevention, the regulation of building construction, and the regulation and issuing of a range of licences for uses of land. It made provision for the creation of additional municipalities to be known as cities, boroughs, or shires, either upon or without petition. Any man or woman over the age of 21 who was liable to be rated on any property in the district was eligible to vote in elections, which were to be held every February. In most other respects, the Local Government Act 1878 followed on from the 1864 act.

The act was modelled on the Victorian Local Government Act 1874 (38 Vict. No. 506 (Vic.)), but the legislation soon proved unsuitable to Queensland's requirements given its large, sparsely populated areas. The government's response was the Divisional Boards Act 1879, which intended to extend local government to those areas of Queensland which could not be included in municipalities. The act divided all lands in the colony not already included into municipalities into 74 divisions, each governed by a Board of between three and nine members. Elections were to be conducted by postal ballot.

== Twentieth century ==
With the passing of the Local Authorities Act 1902, which repealed both previous acts and extended councils' authority over the areas they controlled, the municipalities became towns (unless they had city status), and the divisions became Shires on 31 March 1903. In 1915–1917 and again in 1949, significant changes were made to local government in south-eastern Queensland and far northern Queensland.

The Local Authorities Act Amendment Act 1920 was passed in late 1920. It introduced adult franchise into local government elections, bringing them into line with the state and federal parliament (previously, the voters were restricted to ratepayers). From July 1921, local councils were elected every three years instead of annually. Mayors and shire chairmen were elected directly by the electorate and did not represent any ward within the local government area; previously, the council members elected the mayor/chairman from among themselves. Minimum standards of competency were required for town/shire clerks.

By the time the Local Government Act 1936 came into effect, although the different categories of local government areas still existed, they were essentially a naming convention and had no practical meaning under the act. A city had to be proclaimed by the governor following certain criteria being met.

In 1925, a number of local governments in Brisbane were amalgamated into the City of Brisbane, covering what was then the entire metropolitan area. Its council, Brisbane City Council, effectively became a "super-council" with some powers normally reserved for the state. It has its own act of Parliament, the City of Brisbane Act 1924, and, as at 2021, a population of 1,242,825. Due to population growth and suburban spread, however, almost half of metropolitan Brisbane's population actually lives in neighbouring areas such as Ipswich, Logan, Moreton Bay, and Redland, which are all managed under the Local Government Act.

In 1989, the Electoral and Administrative Review Commission was set up to investigate and report on a range of reforms to Queensland public administration, and one area of its purview was the Local Government Act 1936 and local council boundaries. As a result of its recommendations, the Goss Labor government then in charge amalgamated several councils, and a new Local Government Act 1993 was introduced.

=== Indigenous councils ===
In the mid-1980s, with the passage of the Community Services (Torres Strait) Act 1984 and Community Services (Aborigines) Act 1984, many former Aboriginal reserves (created under the Aboriginals Protection and Restriction of the Sale of Opium Act 1897 and its successors) and missions (particularly in the Cape York region) and several Torres Strait islands were granted by way of a Deed of Grant in Trust to the Aboriginal and Torres Strait Island communities. Formally recognised management bodies known as Indigenous community councils (or DOGIT councils) were set up to administer the land covered in the deed on behalf of the community. These bodies had quite different responsibilities to traditional local governments due to the nature of land ownership involved and the different relationships of the council to the community. In 2005–2007, as part of the Queensland Government's response to the Cape York Justice Study undertaken by Justice Fitzgerald QC in November 2001, these bodies became "Aboriginal Shire Councils" and "Island Councils" and obtained additional powers associated with local governments. A considerable number of them were amalgamated in 2008 into either the Torres Strait Island Region or the Northern Peninsula Area Region, which are Local Government Act bodies with special features, with lower-order community councils once again managing individual deeds and grants.

== Twenty-first century ==
=== 2008 local government amalgamations ===
The Local Government Reform Commission was an independent, purpose-specific authority established by the Beattie Labor Queensland Government on 1 May 2007 to recommend the most appropriate future structure and boundaries for local government in Queensland. This was in part due to the number of financially weak councils with small populations in rural areas, dating from an earlier time when industry and population had justified their creation.

Every local government was reviewed, except Brisbane City Council, already having the largest population of any local government area in Australia.

==== Background ====
With concern about the sustainability of Queensland local governments, the Local Government Association of Queensland instigated reform of local government. Of the 156 councils, 118 agreed to investigate their long-term future through the Size, Shape, and Sustainability (SSS) program; however, it failed to deliver timely, meaningful reform. The Commission reported back on 27 July 2007, recommending massive amalgamations all over the state into "regions" administered by regional councils and centred on major towns or centres, based on a range of criteria such as economy of scale, the community of interest, and financial sustainability. Some changes happened in much larger areas as well – the Sunshine Coast was to come under one local authority instead of three, as was the Moreton Bay region to the north of Brisbane; Beaudesert was split into urban/planned urban and rural sections, with the former going to Logan, and the twin cities of Townsville and Thuringowa in North Queensland were merged.

The Minister for Local Government wrote to all Mayors in March 2007, requesting they assess the progress of the SSS program, what they believed the SSS reform agenda could achieve, and in what time frame. The responses to the Minister showed that significant reform was not going to be achieved by the SSS program before the next local government elections, due in March 2008.

The Queensland Treasury Corporation prepared financial sustainability reviews for 105 councils. The reviews found that some 40% were regarded as being in financially "weak", "very weak", or "distressed" conditions. Other studies by a number of independent bodies – such as the Queensland Auditor-General of Queensland, PricewaterhouseCoopers, and McGrath Nichol – found similar financial problems with the local government sector.

To effect significant reform, the independent Local Government Reform Commission was established to recommend the most appropriate boundaries and structure for Queensland's local governments.

The amalgamation program was not without considerable controversy in many of the affected areas and even a threat of Federal intervention from the Howard government, who funded plebiscites on the change in December 2007 in many affected areas, which recorded a strong "No" vote in most cases but with fairly low turnout by Australian referendum standards.

On 10 August 2007, the Commission's amalgamation recommendations were passed into law as the Local Government (Reform Implementation) Act 2007, with only a few name changes as alterations. "Local Transition Committees" (LTCs) were created for each new area, made up of councillors and staff from the original areas, and on 15 March 2008, the old entities formally ceased to exist, and elections were held to fill the new councils.

==== Commission members ====
The Commission was a panel of seven:

- Bob Longland (Chair) – a former Electoral Commissioner for Queensland.
- Di McCauley – former Queensland Local Government and Planning Minister from 1996 to 1998.
- Tom Pyne – former President of the Local Government Association of Queensland and former Mayor of Cairns.
- Sir Leo Hielscher – Chair of Queensland Treasury Corporation.
- Terry Mackenroth – former Deputy Premier and Treasurer and a Member of Queensland Parliament from 1977 to 2005.
- Bob Quinn – former Leader of the Queensland Liberal Party.
- Kevin Yearbury – former Electoral Commissioner and Director-General of the Local Government and Planning Department.

==== Report and recommendations ====
On 27 July 2007, the Commission handed down recommendations that included the names, classes, boundaries, and electoral arrangements for Queensland's new local government areas. The Commission recommended Queensland's 156 councils be reduced to 72, 32 Aboriginal and island councils will be reduced to 14, and as a result, 724 fewer elected council representatives.

The recommendations divided Queensland's mayors and sparked angry campaigns and protests against the reforms. Some affected councils proposed to hold referendums on amalgamations with threats of dismissal if they went ahead.

Then Premier Peter Beattie vowed to implement the proposed boundary changes "lock, stock, and barrel" although, at the time, he said he'd be open to consensus suggestions from the Councils to be amalgamated as to the names of the new Councils and the electoral divisions within the Local Government Areas.

The Opposition leader, Jeff Seeney, pledged to de-amalgamate councils with community support by way of a poll if they came to office.

==== Outcomes ====
The Parliament of Queensland passed the Local Government (Reform Implementation) Act 2007 on 10 August 2007, following which Local Transition Committees were established to guide the reforms and appoint interim CEOs (Chief Executive Officers) to manage changes from October through to February 2008.

In September 2007, Premier Beattie resigned from the Queensland Parliament, and, under the new Premier, Anna Bligh, on 15 March 2008, local government elections were held successfully, and on this date, the Local Government Reform Commission's recommended local government areas came into being across the whole of Queensland.

=== De-amalgamation ===
Despite the creation of the new local government authorities in 2008, many citizens continued to object to the council amalgamations. During the 2012 Queensland state election campaign, the Liberal National Party promised to reconsider the amalgamations. Having won government on 24 March 2012, they invited former shires wishing to de-amalgamate to make submissions which:

- demonstrated that it was financially viable to de-amalgamate
- accepted that the re-established shire would bear the full costs of de-amalgamation
- was supported by the signatures of at least 20% of the voters in the former shires.

Viable proposals would then be put to a referendum of citizens in the former shire for a majority vote on de-amalgamation. Submissions were received from 19 communities, but only four submissions were found to be viable proposals: Douglas, Livingstone, Mareeba, and Noosa.

On 9 March 2013, citizens of the former shires of Douglas, Livingstone, Mareeba and Noosa voted in de-amalgamation referendums. In all four cases, a majority voted in favour of de-amalgamation. As a result, the Queensland Government enacted the Local Government (De-amalgamation Implementation) Regulation 2013 on 11 April 2013 to implement the de-amalgamations, which will separate:

- the Shire of Douglas from the Cairns Region
- the Shire of Livingstone from the Rockhampton Region
- the Shire of Mareeba from the Tablelands Region
- the Shire of Noosa from the Sunshine Coast Region

based on the boundaries of the four former shires at the time of amalgamation in 2008. Elections for the four affected shires were held on 9 November 2013, and the changes officially took effect from 1 January 2014, and

== Political composition ==
LGA	Elected mayor		Council control	
LGA	Mayor	Party	2020 result	2024 result
Aurukun	Barbara Bandicootcha	Independent	Independent	Independent
Balonne	Samantha O'Toole	Independent	Independent	Independent
Banana	Neville Ferrier	Independent	Independent	Independent
Barcaldine	Rob Chandler	Independent	Independent	Independent
Barcoo	Sally O'Neil	Independent	Independent	Independent
Blackall-Tambo	Andrew Martin	Independent LNP	Independent	Independent
Boulia	Eric (Rick) Britton	Independent	Independent	Independent
Brisbane	Adrian Schrinner	Liberal National	Liberal National	Liberal National
Bulloo	John (Tractor) Ferguson	Independent	Independent	Independent
Bundaberg	Helen Blackburn	Independent	Independent	Independent
Burdekin	Pierina Dalle Cort	Independent	Independent	Independent
Burke	Ernie Camp	Independent	Independent	Independent
Cairns	Amy Eden	Team Eden	Cairns Unity	No overall control
Carpentaria	Jack Bawden	Independent	Independent	Independent
Cassowary Coast	Teresa Millwood	Independent	Independent	Independent
Central Highlands	Janice Moriarty	Independent	Independent	Independent
Charters Towers	Liz Schmidt	Independent LNP	Independent	Independent
Cherbourg	Bruce Simpson	Independent	Independent	Independent
Cloncurry	Greg Campbell	Independent	Independent	Independent
Cook	Robyn Holmes	Independent	Independent	Independent
Croydon	Trevor Pickering	Independent	Independent	Independent
Diamantina	Francis Murray	Independent	Independent	Independent
Doomadgee	Fredrick O'Keefe	Independent	Independent	Independent
Douglas	Lisa Scomazzon	Independent	Independent	Independent
Etheridge	Barry Hughes	Independent	Independent	Independent
Flinders	Kate Peddle	Independent	Independent	Independent
Fraser Coast	George Seymour	Independent	Independent	Independent
Gladstone	Matt Burnett	Independent	Independent	Independent
Gold Coast	Tom Tate	Independent LNP	Independent LNP	Independent LNP
Goondiwindi	Laurence Springborg	Independent LNP	Independent	Independent
Gympie	Glen Hartwig	Independent	Independent	Independent
Hinchinbrook	Ramon Jayo	Independent	Independent	Independent
Hope Vale	Bruce Gibson	Independent	Independent	Independent
Ipswich	Teresa Harding	Independent LNP	No overall control	No overall control
Isaac	Kelly Vea Vea	Independent Labor	Independent	Independent
Kowanyama	Territa Dick	Independent	Independent	Independent
Livingstone	Adam Belot	Independent	Independent	Independent
Lockhart River	Wayne Butcher	Independent	Independent	Independent
Lockyer Valley	Tanya Milligan	Independent	Independent	Independent
Logan	Jon Raven	Independent Labor	Independent	Independent
Longreach	Tony Rayner	Independent	Independent	Independent
Mackay	Greg Williamson	Team Greg Williamson	Greg Williamson Alliance	No overall control
Mapoon	Ronaldo Guivarro	Independent	Independent	Independent
Maranoa	Wendy Taylor	Independent	Independent	Independent
Mareeba	Angela Toppin	Independent	Independent	Independent
McKinlay	Janene Fegan	Independent	Independent	Independent
Moreton Bay	Peter Flannery	Independent	Independent	Independent
Mornington	Richard Sewter	Independent	Independent	Independent
Mount Isa	Peta MacRae	Team MacRae		
Murweh	Shaun Radnedge	Independent	Independent	Independent
Napranum	Roy Chevathen	Independent	Independent	Independent
Noosa	Frank Wilkie	Independent	Independent	Independent
North Burnett	Les Hotz	Independent	Independent	Independent
Northern Peninsula	Robert Poipoi	Independent	Independent	Independent
Palm Island	Alf Lacey	Independent	Independent	Independent
Paroo	Suzette Beresford	Independent	Independent	Independent
Pormpuraaw	Ralph Kendall	Independent	Independent	Independent
Quilpie	Benjamin Hall	Independent	Independent	Independent
Redland	Jos Mitchell	Leading Change	Independent	Independent
Richmond	John Wharton	Independent	Independent	Independent
Rockhampton	Tony Williams	Independent Labor	Independent	Independent
Scenic Rim	Tom Sharp	Independent	Independent	Independent
Somerset	Jason Wendt	Independent	Independent	Independent
South Burnett	Kathy Duff	Independent LNP	Independent	Independent
Southern Downs	Melissa Hamilton	Independent	Independent	Independent
Sunshine Coast	Rosanna Natoli	Independent	Independent	Independent
Tablelands	Rod Marti	Independent	Independent	Independent
Toowoomba	Geoff McDonald	Independent	Independent	Independent
Torres	Elsie Seriat	Independent	Independent	Independent
Torres Strait Islands	Phillemon Mosby	Independent	Independent	Independent
Townsville	Troy Thompson	Independent	Team Jenny Hill	No overall control
Western Downs	Andrew Smith	Independent	Independent	Independent
Whistunday	Ry Collins	Independent	Independent	Independent
Winton	Cathy White	Independent	Independent	Independent
Woorabinda	Terence Munns	Independent	Independent	Independent
Wujal Wujal	Alister Gibson	Independent	Independent	Independent
Yarrabah	Daryl Sexton	Independent	Independent	Independent
