= 2024 Queensland local elections =

Australian local elections

- 16 March 2024
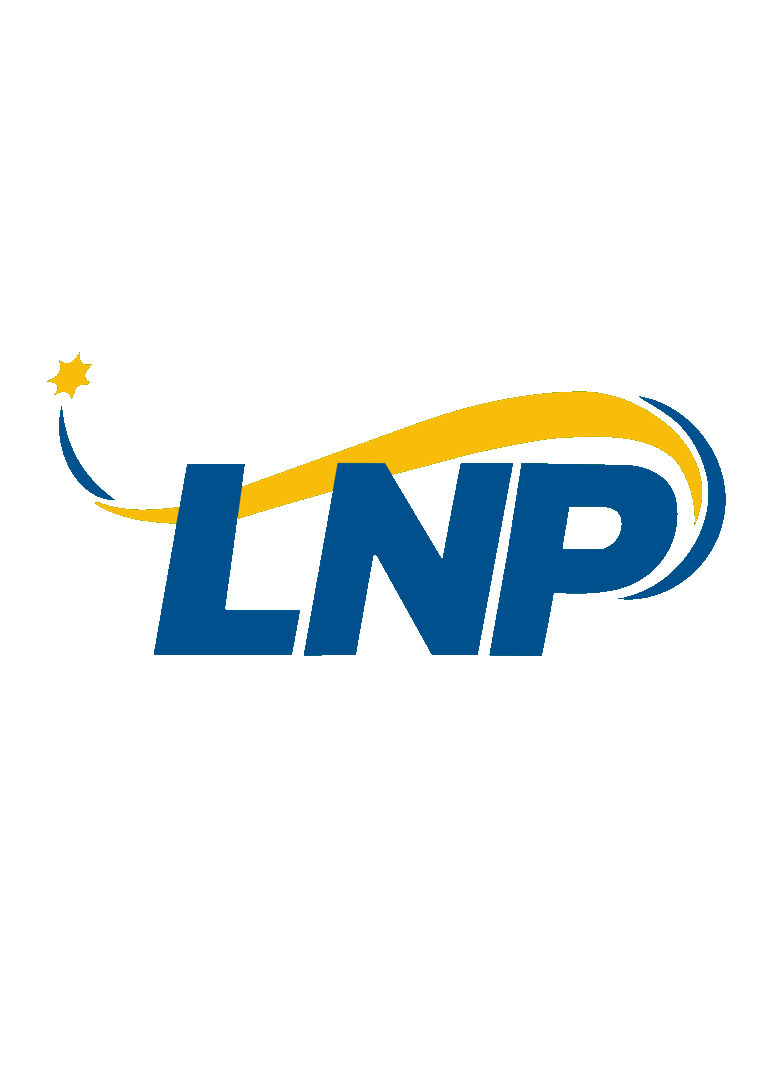

	First party	Second party
	IND
Party	Independents	Liberal National
Last election	424 seats	19 seats
Seats before	424	19
Seats won	446	18
Seat change	▲22	▼1
	Third party	Fourth party
Party	Labor	Greens
Last election	5 seats	1 seat
Seats before	5	1
Seats won	5	2
Seat change	Steady	▲1

The 2024 Queensland local elections were held on 16 March 2024 to elect the mayors and councils of the 77 local government areas in Queensland, Australia.

The original scheduled elections date of 30 March 2024 was moved ahead to 16 March to avoid clashing with Easter holidays.

The elections were held on the same day as the state by-elections in Inala and Ipswich West.

There was a surprisingly large number of candidates elected unopposed in many council elections across Queensland, including some mayoral races. The lack of opposition to these candidates was criticised by experts as being bad for democracy.

== Electoral systems ==
Like at state and federal elections, voting at Queensland local elections is compulsory. The elections are conducted by the Electoral Commission of Queensland (ECQ).

=== Mayors and single-member wards ===
All 77 councils use optional preferential voting (OPV) for mayoral elections. Under this system, voters are only required to vote for one candidate, although they can choose to preference other candidates.

In the 22 councils that use single-member wards (including Brisbane, Gold Coast and Townsville) OPV is also used.

=== Multi-member wards ===
Only Ipswich uses multi-member wards, with four two-member wards (resulting in eight total councillors).

No form of preferential voting is in place, with plurality block voting − also referred to as first-past-the-post by the ECQ − instead used. Voters are only required to mark the same amount of candidates as there are positions to be elected (in the case of Ipswich, two candidates).

=== Undivided councils ===
54 councils are undivided, meaning they do not use any forms of wards and all councillors are elected to a single area representing the entire council.

Plurality block voting is used for these councils.

== Candidates ==
1,422 candidates were nominated for the elections at the close of nominations on 14 February 2024.

Steve "Jacko" Jackson, a former rugby league footballer, ran for mayor of Mackay. Former MP George Christensen contested Mackay Regional Council as a candidate for Jackson's Mackay First ticket.

Another former federal MP, Andrew Laming, ran for mayor of Redland. On 25 January 2024, he confirmed he had dropped his Liberal National Party (LNP) membership, saying it had "no place" at a local level". 15 mayoral positions and 46 councillor positions were uncontested, the highest number since 2012.

On 21 February, the LNP disendorsed Brisbane City Council candidate Brock Alexander after comments he allegedly made about the parents of Daniel Morecombe came to light. Alexander was a candidate for Deagon Ward, and his name still appeared on the ballot as he was disendorsed after the close of nominations.

An analysis from the ABC found that over 10% of independents in the elections were members of a political party.

== Party changes before elections ==
A number of councillors joined, left or formed parties before the 2024 elections.

Council	Ward	Councillor	Former party	New party	Date
Gold Coast	Division 9	Glenn Tozer	Independent LNP	Independent	June 2020
Cairns	Division 2	Rob Pyne	Independent Socialist	Socialist Alliance	23 September 2020
Redland	Mayor	Karen Williams	Independent	Independent LNP	17 May 2021
Cairns	Division 9	Brett Olds	Independent LNP	Independent	20 September 2021
Moreton Bay	Division 7	Yvonne Barlow	Independent LNP	Independent	2022
Scenic Rim	Mayor	Greg Christensen	Independent LNP	Independent	26 April 2023
Cairns	Division 5	Amy Eden	Cairns Unity	Team Eden	14 July 2023
Mackay	Unsubdivided	Belinda Hassan	Greg Williamson Alliance	Independent Labor	15 December 2023
Mackay	Unsubdivided	Fran Mann	Greg Williamson Alliance	Independent Labor	15 December 2023
Mackay	Unsubdivided	Justin Englert	Greg Williamson Alliance	Independent	15 December 2023
Mackay	Unsubdivided	Pauline Townsend	Greg Williamson Alliance	Independent	15 December 2023

== Results ==
All changes compared with the 2020 elections.

Party	Votes	%	Swing	Seats		Councils	
Party	Votes	%	Swing	Number	Change	Number	Change
Liberal National	329,282			18	▼1	1	Steady
Mackay First	233,137			4	▲4	0	Steady
Labor	188,946			5	Steady	0	Steady
Say NO to WOKE	50,418			0	Steady	0	Steady
Westgarths	43,665			0	Steady	0	Steady
Your Voice Of Experience	27,288			2	Steady	0	Steady
Better Brighter Ipswich	23,613			1	▲1	0	Steady
Working For Our Community	21,621			0	Steady	0	Steady
Independent Federation	18,801			0	Steady	0	Steady
Community Centred and Connected	16,715			0	Steady	0	Steady
Team Sheila Ireland	10,256			0	Steady	0	Steady
Independent Socialist Alliance	2,296			1	▲1	0	Steady
Independent United Australia	2,220			0	Steady	0	Steady
Independent Democratic	545			0	Steady	0	Steady
Independent				446			
Independent Liberal National				40		1	Steady
Independent Labor				29		0	Steady
Greens				2	▲1	0	Steady
Animal Justice				0	Steady	0	Steady
Independent Animal Justice				1	▲1	0	Steady
Team Eden				1	▲1	0	Steady
Cairns Unity Team				3	▼3	0	▼1
Jos Mitchell Leading Change				3	▲3	0	Steady
Team Jenny Hill				4	▼5	0	▼1
Team Barwick				0		0	Steady
Community First				0	Steady	0	Steady
TownsvilleCHANGE				2	▲2	0	Steady
Team MacRae				4		0	Steady
A Better Lockyer				1	Steady	0	Steady
Unity Maranoa				1		0	Steady
Team Greg Williamson				2	▼4 (Note: When compared to the Greg Williamson Alliance at the 2020 election)	0	▼1
Locals United - Back to Basics				0	Steady	0	Steady
Independent Legalise Cannabis				0	Steady	0	Steady
Independent One Nation				0	Steady	0	Steady
Independent National				0	Steady	0	Steady
Independent Indigenous				0	Steady	0	Steady
Independent Democrats				0	Steady	0	Steady
Formal votes							
Informal votes							
Total (Note: Most local councils are undivided, meaning the total number of votes is greater than the total number of ballots. This row lists the number of ballots.)							
Registered voters / turnout							

=== Council control ===
LGA	Elected mayor		Council control	
LGA	Mayor	Party	2020 result	2024 result
Aurukun	Barbara Bandicootcha	Independent	Independent	Independent
Balonne	Samantha O'Toole	Independent	Independent	Independent
Banana	Neville Ferrier	Independent	Independent	Independent
Barcaldine	Rob Chandler	Independent	Independent	Independent
Barcoo	Sally O'Neil	Independent	Independent	Independent
Blackall-Tambo	Andrew Martin	Independent LNP	Independent	Independent
Boulia	Eric (Rick) Britton	Independent	Independent	Independent
Brisbane	Adrian Schrinner	Liberal National	Liberal National	Liberal National
Bulloo	John (Tractor) Ferguson	Independent	Independent	Independent
Bundaberg	Helen Blackburn	Independent	Independent	Independent
Burdekin	Pierina Dalle Cort	Independent	Independent	Independent
Burke	Ernie Camp	Independent	Independent	Independent
Cairns	Amy Eden	Team Eden	Cairns Unity	No overall control
Carpentaria	Jack Bawden	Independent	Independent	Independent
Cassowary Coast	Teresa Millwood	Independent	Independent	Independent
Central Highlands	Janice Moriarty	Independent	Independent	Independent
Charters Towers	Liz Schmidt	Independent LNP	Independent	Independent
Cherbourg	Bruce Simpson	Independent	Independent	Independent
Cloncurry	Greg Campbell	Independent	Independent	Independent
Cook	Robyn Holmes	Independent	Independent	Independent
Croydon	Trevor Pickering	Independent	Independent	Independent
Diamantina	Francis Murray	Independent	Independent	Independent
Doomadgee	Fredrick O'Keefe	Independent	Independent	Independent
Douglas	Lisa Scomazzon	Independent	Independent	Independent
Etheridge	Barry Hughes	Independent	Independent	Independent
Flinders	Kate Peddle	Independent	Independent	Independent
Fraser Coast	George Seymour	Independent	Independent	Independent
Gladstone	Matt Burnett	Independent	Independent	Independent
Gold Coast	Tom Tate	Independent LNP	Independent LNP	Independent LNP
Goondiwindi	Laurence Springborg	Independent LNP	Independent	Independent
Gympie	Glen Hartwig	Independent	Independent	Independent
Hinchinbrook	Ramon Jayo	Independent	Independent	Independent
Hope Vale	Bruce Gibson	Independent	Independent	Independent
Ipswich	Teresa Harding	Independent LNP	No overall control	No overall control
Isaac	Kelly Vea Vea	Independent Labor	Independent	Independent
Kowanyama	Territa Dick	Independent	Independent	Independent
Livingstone	Adam Belot	Independent	Independent	Independent
Lockhart River	Wayne Butcher	Independent	Independent	Independent
Lockyer Valley	Tanya Milligan	Independent	Independent	Independent
Logan	Jon Raven	Independent Labor	Independent	Independent
Longreach	Tony Rayner	Independent	Independent	Independent
Mackay	Greg Williamson	Team Greg Williamson	Greg Williamson Alliance	No overall control
Mapoon	Ronaldo Guivarro	Independent	Independent	Independent
Maranoa	Wendy Taylor	Independent	Independent	Independent
Mareeba	Angela Toppin	Independent	Independent	Independent
McKinlay	Janene Fegan	Independent	Independent	Independent
Moreton Bay	Peter Flannery	Independent	Independent	Independent
Mornington	Richard Sewter	Independent	Independent	Independent
Mount Isa	Peta MacRae	Team MacRae		
Murweh	Shaun Radnedge	Independent	Independent	Independent
Napranum	Roy Chevathen	Independent	Independent	Independent
Noosa	Frank Wilkie	Independent	Independent	Independent
North Burnett	Les Hotz	Independent	Independent	Independent
Northern Peninsula	Robert Poipoi	Independent	Independent	Independent
Palm Island	Alf Lacey	Independent	Independent	Independent
Paroo	Suzette Beresford	Independent	Independent	Independent
Pormpuraaw	Ralph Kendall	Independent	Independent	Independent
Quilpie	Benjamin Hall	Independent	Independent	Independent
Redland	Jos Mitchell	Leading Change	Independent	Independent
Richmond	John Wharton	Independent	Independent	Independent
Rockhampton	Tony Williams	Independent Labor	Independent	Independent
Scenic Rim	Tom Sharp	Independent	Independent	Independent
Somerset	Jason Wendt	Independent	Independent	Independent
South Burnett	Kathy Duff	Independent LNP	Independent	Independent
Southern Downs	Melissa Hamilton	Independent	Independent	Independent
Sunshine Coast	Rosanna Natoli	Independent	Independent	Independent
Tablelands	Rod Marti	Independent	Independent	Independent
Toowoomba	Geoff McDonald	Independent	Independent	Independent
Torres	Elsie Seriat	Independent	Independent	Independent
Torres Strait Islands	Phillemon Mosby	Independent	Independent	Independent
Townsville	Troy Thompson	Independent	Team Jenny Hill	No overall control
Western Downs	Andrew Smith	Independent	Independent	Independent
Whistunday	Ry Collins	Independent	Independent	Independent
Winton	Cathy White	Independent	Independent	Independent
Woorabinda	Terence Munns	Independent	Independent	Independent
Wujal Wujal	Alister Gibson	Independent	Independent	Independent
Yarrabah	Daryl Sexton	Independent	Independent	Independent

== See also ==
- 2024 Queensland mayoral elections
- 2024 Brisbane City Council election
- 2024 Cairns Regional Council election
- 2024 Ipswich City Council election
- 2024 Gold Coast City Council election
- 2024 Townsville City Council election
