= Results of the 2024 Queensland local elections =

This is a list of local government area results for the 2024 Queensland local elections.

== Aurukun ==
2024 Queensland local elections: Aurukun
Party	Candidate	Votes	%	±%
Independent	Craig Koomeeta (elected)	433	20.54	+2.80
Independent	Leona Nanette Yunkaporta (elected)	424	20.11	+20.11
Independent	Eloise Yunkaporta (elected)	375	17.79	+17.79
Independent	Jayden Marriott (elected)	369	17.50	+17.50
Independent	Kempo Tamwoy	317	15.04	−3.60
Independent	Bobby Adidi	190	9.01	+0.38
Total formal votes		527	93.61	+6.53
Informal votes		36	6.39	−6.53
Turnout		563	60.28	−6.63

== Banana ==
=== Division 1 ===
2024 Queensland local elections: Division 1
Party	Candidate	Votes	%	±%
Independent	Adam Burling	549	46.33	+46.33
Independent	John Ramsey	432	36.46	−13.77
Independent	Jason Williams	204	17.22	−32.55
Total formal votes		1,185	99.0	+1.64
Informal votes		12	1.0	−0.34
Turnout		1,197	69.55	+0.02
Independent gain from Independent		Swing	+46.33	

=== Division 2 ===
2024 Queensland local elections: Division 2
Party	Candidate	Votes	%	±%
Independent LNP	Ashley Jensen	691	50.66	+50.66
Independent	Col Neville	673	49.34	+8.11
Total formal votes		1,364	98.77	−0.17
Informal votes		17	1.23	+0.17
Turnout		1,381	76.76	+3.93
Independent LNP gain from Independent		Swing	+50.66	

- Incumbent councillor Judith Pender (Independent) did not seek re-election.

=== Division 3 ===
2024 Queensland local elections: Division 3
Party	Candidate	Votes	%	±%
Independent	Phillip Casey	unopposed		
Independent hold		Swing	N/A	

=== Division 4 ===
2024 Queensland local elections: Division 4
Party	Candidate	Votes	%	±%
Independent LNP	Kerrith Bailey	unopposed		
Independent LNP gain from Independent		Swing	N/A	

- Incumbent councillor Colin Semple (Independent) did not seek re-election.

=== Division 5 ===
2024 Queensland local elections: Division 5
Party	Candidate	Votes	%	±%
Independent	Brooke Leo	unopposed		
Independent hold		Swing	N/A	

=== Division 6 ===
2024 Queensland local elections: Division 6
Party	Candidate	Votes	%	±%
Independent LNP	Terri Boyce	751	56.13	+56.13
Independent	Harold Ball	587	43.87	+43.87
Total formal votes		1,338	99.33	+99.33
Informal votes		9	0.67	+0.67
Turnout		1,347	82.74	+82.74
Independent LNP hold		Swing	+56.13	

== Brisbane ==
2024 Queensland local elections: Brisbane
Party	Votes	%	Swing	Seats	Change
Liberal National	329,337	46.87	+0.99	18	▼1
Labor	188,967	26.91	−5.99	5	Steady
Greens	162,608	23.15	+5.35	2	▲1
Independent	21,390	3.05	−0.15	1	Steady
Two-party-preferred vote
Liberal National		55.4	+1.8		
Labor		44.6	−1.8		

=== Bracken Ridge ===
2024 Queensland local elections: Bracken Ridge Ward
Party	Candidate	Votes	%	±%
Liberal National	Sandy Landers	14,997	56.91	+6.87
Labor	Thomas Stephen	7,836	29.74	−7.80
Greens	John Harbison	3,519	13.35	+0.93
Total formal votes		26,352	97.63	+0.54
Informal votes		640	2.37	−0.54
Turnout		26,992	85.84	+4.58
Two-party-preferred result
Liberal National	Sandy Landers	15,418	61.37	+7.22
Labor	Thomas Stephen	9,704	38.63	−7.22
Liberal National hold		Swing	+7.22	

=== Calamvale ===
2024 Queensland local elections: Calamvale Ward
Party	Candidate	Votes	%	±%
Liberal National	Angela Owen	13,447	45.02	−3.31
Labor	Emily Kim	13,280	44.46	+2.52
Greens	Andrea Wildin	3,141	10.52	+0.79
Total formal votes		29,868	97.81	+0.55
Informal votes		668	2.19	−0.55
Turnout		30,536	85.51	+3.38
Two-party-preferred result
Labor	Emily Kim	14,824	51.71	+3.95
Liberal National	Angela Owen	13,842	48.29	−3.95
Labor gain from Liberal National		Swing	+3.95	

=== Central ===
2024 Queensland local elections: Central Ward
Party	Candidate	Votes	%	±%
Liberal National	Vicki Howard	11,674	46.69	−1.71
Greens	Wendy Aghdam	8,888	35.55	+8.05
Labor	Ash Murray	4,440	17.76	−6.34
Total formal votes		25,002	98.37	+0.39
Informal votes		414	1.63	−0.39
Turnout		25,416	76.05	+6.63
Two-party-preferred result
Liberal National	Vicki Howard	12,331	52.98	−4.79
Greens	Wendy Aghdam	10,944	47.02	+4.79
Liberal National hold		Swing	−4.79	

=== Chandler ===
2024 Queensland local elections: Chandler Ward
Party	Candidate	Votes	%	±%
Liberal National	Ryan Murphy	17,167	65.43	+1.54
Labor	Tabatha Young	5,748	21.91	−3.48
Greens	Alex David	3,321	12.66	+1.94
Total formal votes		26,236	98.16	+0.50
Informal votes		493	1.84	−0.50
Turnout		26,729	88.42	+4.23
Two-party-preferred result
Liberal National	Ryan Murphy	17,517	70.11	+1.78
Labor	Tabatha Young	7,467	29.89	−1.78
Liberal National hold		Swing	+1.78	

=== Coorparoo ===
2024 Queensland local elections: Coorparoo Ward
Party	Candidate	Votes	%	±%
Liberal National	Fiona Cunningham	12,226	44.87	0.0
Greens	Kath Angus	9,500	34.86	+7.24
Labor	Alicia Weiderman	5,523	20.27	−7.24
Total formal votes		27,249	98.4	
Informal votes		435	1.6	
Turnout		27,684	83.37	+6.07
Two-party-preferred result
Liberal National	Fiona Cunningham	13,132	52.3	−3.37
Greens	Kath Angus	11,976	47.7	+3.37
Liberal National hold		Swing	−3.37	

=== Deagon ===
2024 Queensland local elections: Deagon Ward
Party	Candidate	Votes	%	±%
Labor	Jared Cassidy	16,672	58.46	+7.12
Liberal National	Brock Alexander (disendorsed)	7,092	24.87	−10.01
Greens	Edward Naus	4,754	16.67	+5.20
Total formal votes		28,518	96.61	−0.77
Informal votes		1001	3.39	+0.77
Turnout		29,519	84.24	+3.09
Two-party-preferred result
Labor	Jared Cassidy	19,302	72.14	+10.64
Liberal National	Brock Alexander (disendorsed)	7,374	27.86	−10.64
Labor hold		Swing	+10.64	

=== Doboy ===
2024 Queensland local elections: Doboy Ward
Party	Candidate	Votes	%	±%
Liberal National	Lisa Atwood	15,377	58.90	+4.17
Labor	Alex Cossu	6,757	25.88	−19.39
Greens	James Smart	3,971	15.21	+15.21
Total formal votes		26,105	97.87	+0.67
Informal votes		568	2.13	−0.67
Turnout		26,673	86.50	+4.35
Two-party-preferred result
Liberal National	Lisa Atwood	15,886	64.06	+9.36
Labor	Alex Cossu	8,912	35.94	−9.36
Liberal National hold		Swing	+9.36	

=== Enoggera ===
2024 Queensland local elections: Enoggera Ward
Party	Candidate	Votes	%	±%
Liberal National	Andrew Wines	12,467	45.38	+0.28
Greens	Quintessa Denniz	8,487	30.89	+14.79
Labor	Taylar Wojtasik	6,521	23.73	−10.77
Total formal votes		27,475	98.27	
Informal votes		485	1.73	
Turnout		27,960	85.26	
Two-candidate-preferred result
Liberal National	Andrew Wines	13,428	53.24	+ 1.34
Greens	Quintessa Denniz	11,990	46.76	+46.76
Liberal National hold		Swing	+1.34	

=== Forest Lake ===
2024 Queensland local elections: Forest Lake Ward
Party	Candidate	Votes	%	±%
Labor	Charles Strunk	10,654	39.71	−13.09
Liberal National	Kylie Gates	9,237	34.43	+3.53
Greens	Vi Phuong Nguyen	6,941	25.87	+9.57
Total formal votes		26,832	97.35	
Informal votes		731	2.65	
Turnout		27,563	80.61	
Two-party-preferred result
Labor	Charles Strunk	12,800	55.33	−8.07
Liberal National	Kylie Gates	10,333	44.67	+8.07
Labor hold		Swing	−8.07	

=== Hamilton ===
2024 Queensland local elections: Hamilton Ward
Party	Candidate	Votes	%	±%
Liberal National	Julia Dixon	16,862	63.26	−0.48
Greens	Edward Cordery	5,297	19.87	+3.45
Labor	Leah Malzard	4,498	16.87	−2.97
Total formal votes		26,657	98.45	+0.74
Informal votes		421	1.55	−0.74
Turnout		26,657	80.45	+6.01
Two-candidate-preferred result
Liberal National	Julia Dixon	17,531	71.13	+0.63
Greens	Edward Cordery	7,115	28.87	+28.87
Liberal National hold		Swing	+0.63	

=== Holland Park ===
2024 Queensland local elections: Holland Park Ward
Party	Candidate	Votes	%	±%
Liberal National	Krista Adams	13,121	47.76	−0.64
Labor	Shane Warren	7,543	27.46	−3.24
Greens	David Ford	6,807	24.78	+3.88
Total formal votes		27,421	98.01	
Informal votes		558	1.99	
Turnout		28,029	86.93	
Two-party-preferred result
Liberal National	Krista Adams	13,794	53.72	−1.08
Labor	Shane Warren	11,882	46.28	+1.08
Liberal National hold		Swing	−1.08	

=== Jamboree ===
2024 Queensland local elections: Jamboree Ward
Party	Candidate	Votes	%	±%
Liberal National	Sarah Hutton	17,391	65.90	+10.96
Labor	Leili Golafshani	5,007	18.97	−13.68
Greens	Chris Richardson	3,991	15.12	+2.71
Total formal votes		26,389	97.85	+0.82
Informal votes		580	2.15	−0.82
Turnout		26,969	86.89	+2.71
Two-party-preferred result
Liberal National	Sarah Hutton	18,008	71.90	+12.60
Labor	Leili Golafshani	7,038	28.10	−12.60
Liberal National hold		Swing	+12.60	

=== MacGregor ===
2024 Queensland local elections: MacGregor Ward
Party	Candidate	Votes	%	±%
Liberal National	Steven Huang	15,165	60.34	+0.95
Labor	Ashwina Gotame	5,957	23.70	−5.05
Greens	Brent Tideswell	4,009	15.96	+4.10
Total formal votes		25,131	97.82	+0.55
Informal votes		561	2.18	−0.55
Turnout		25,692	83.71	+2.63
Two-party-preferred result
Liberal National	Steven Huang	15,655	66.44	+2.34
Labor	Ashwina Gotame	7,909	33.56	−2.34
Liberal National hold		Swing	+2.34	

=== Marchant ===
2024 Queensland local elections: Marchant Ward
Party	Candidate	Votes	%	±%
Liberal National	Danita Parry	13,200	46.74	−2.56
Labor	Darren Mitchell	8,610	30.49	−2.21
Greens	Mekayla Anog	6,429	22.77	+4.77
Total formal votes		28,239	97.78	
Informal votes		641	2.22	
Turnout		28,880	84.18	
Two-party-preferred result
Liberal National	Danita Parry	13,762	52.20	−2.70
Labor	Darren Mitchell	12,601	47.80	+2.70
Liberal National hold		Swing	+2.70	

=== McDowall ===
2024 Queensland local elections: McDowall Ward
Party	Candidate	Votes	%	±%
Liberal National	Tracy Davis	17,056	60.62	+1.44
Labor	Mark Wolhuter	6,093	21.65	−8.08
Greens	Joshua Sanderson	3,885	13.81	+2.72
Independent	David Dallaston	1,103	3.92	+3.92
Total formal votes		28,137	98.00	+0.28
Informal votes		575	2.00	−0.28
Turnout		28,712	86.84	+4.51
Two-party-preferred result
Liberal National	Tracy Davis	17,695	67.44	+3.84
Labor	Mark Wolhuter	7,919	32.56	−3.84
Liberal National hold		Swing	+3.84	

=== Moorooka ===
2024 Queensland local elections: Moorooka Ward
Party	Candidate	Votes	%	±%
Labor	Steve Griffiths	11,269	45.63	−4.27
Greens	Melissa McArdle	6,910	27.98	+7.78
Liberal National	Peter Zhuang	6,515	26.38	+1.28
Total formal votes		24,694	97.31	
Informal votes		683	2.69	
Turnout		25,377	82.40	
Notional two-party-preferred count
Labor	Steve Griffiths	12,559	69.5	−0.1
Liberal National	Peter Zhuang	5,467	30.5	+0.1
Two-candidate-preferred result
Labor	Steve Griffiths	12,588	62.78	−6.88
Greens	Melissa McArdle	7,463	37.22	+37.22
Labor hold		Swing	−6.88	

=== Morningside ===
2024 Queensland local elections: Morningside Ward
Party	Candidate	Votes	%	±%
Liberal National	Allie Griffin	10,600	40.14	+3.24
Labor	Lucy Collier	9,173	34.73	−13.17
Greens	Linda Barry	6,637	25.13	+9.93
Total formal votes		26,410	98.32	
Informal votes		450	1.68	
Turnout		26,860	85.10	
Two-party-preferred result
Labor	Lucy Collier	13,393	54.51	−5.09
Liberal National	Allie Griffin	11,176	45.49	+5.09
Labor hold		Swing	−5.09	

=== Northgate ===
2024 Queensland local elections: Northgate Ward
Party	Candidate	Votes	%	±%
Liberal National	Adam Allan	12,930	45.89	−0.81
Labor	Vicki Ryan	9,725	34.42	−1.88
Greens	Tiana Peneha	5,520	19.59	+2.69
Total formal votes		28,175	97.94	
Informal votes		593	2.06	
Turnout		28,768	97.94	
Two-party-preferred result
Liberal National	Adam Allan	13,472	50.81	−0.99
Labor	Vicki Ryan	13,041	49.19	+0.99
Liberal National hold		Swing	−0.99	

=== Paddington ===
2024 Queensland local elections: Paddington Ward
Party	Candidate	Votes	%	±%
Liberal National	Clare Jenkinson	12,090	43.86	−1.64
Greens	Seal Chong Wah	10,863	39.41	+1.11
Labor	Sún Etheridge	4,613	16.73	+0.53
Total formal votes		27,566	98.57	
Informal votes		400	1.43	
Turnout		27,966	83.82	
Two-candidate-preferred result
Greens	Seal Chong Wah	13,241	50.76	+1.46
Liberal National	Clare Jenkinson	12,845	49.24	−1.46
Greens gain from Liberal National		Swing	+1.46	

=== Pullenvale ===
2024 Queensland local elections: Pullenvale Ward
Party	Candidate	Votes	%	±%
Liberal National	Greg Adermann	15,590	53.82	+12.14
Greens	Charles Druckmann	7,001	24.17	−0.21
Labor	Roberta Albrecht	3,312	11.43	−2.78
Independent	Kate Richards	3,062	10.57	−9.16
Total formal votes		28,965	98.2	+0.6
Informal votes		539	1.8	−0.6
Turnout		29,504	89.5	+6.8
Two-candidate-preferred result
Liberal National	Greg Adermann	16,902	64.32	+4.39
Greens	Charles Druckmann	9,374	35.68	−4.39
Liberal National hold		Swing	+4.39	

=== Runcorn ===
2024 Queensland local elections: Runcorn Ward
Party	Candidate	Votes	%	±%
Liberal National	Kim Marx	13,086	50.85	−3.25
Labor	John Prescott	8,952	34.79	−0.71
Greens	Emma Eastaughffe	3,695	14.36	+3.96
Total formal votes		25,733	97.36	
Informal votes		686	2.64	
Turnout		26,430	83.41	
Two-party-preferred result
Liberal National	Kim Marx	13,541	55.82	−2.48
Labor	John Prescott	10,716	44.18	+2.48
Liberal National hold		Swing	−2.48	

=== Tennyson ===
2024 Queensland local elections: Tennyson Ward
Party	Candidate	Votes	%	±%
Independent	Nicole Johnston	13,991	53.92	+2.86
Liberal National	Henry Swindon	4,844	18.67	−0.72
Greens	River Kearns	4,233	16.31	+2.82
Labor	Kane Hart	2,881	11.10	−3.07
Total formal votes		25,949	98.50	+0.14
Informal votes		396	1.5	−0.14
Turnout		26,345	86.74	+7.57
Two-candidate-preferred result
Independent	Nicole Johnston	17,799	75.90	+2.5
Liberal National	Henry Swindon	5,652	24.10	−2.5
Independent hold		Swing	+2.5	

=== The Gabba ===
2024 Queensland local elections: The Gabba Ward
Party	Candidate	Votes	%	±%
Greens	Trina Massey	11,463	45.12	−0.48
Liberal National	Laura Wong	7,899	31.09	+1.69
Labor	Rebecca McIntosh	6,043	23.79	−1.21
Total formal votes		25,405	98.28	
Informal votes		444	1.72	
Turnout		25,849	78.92	
Two-candidate-preferred result
Greens	Trina Massey	13,554	60.84	−1.46
Liberal National	Laura Wong	8,995	39.16	+1.46
Greens hold		Swing	−1.46	

=== The Gap ===
2024 Queensland local elections: The Gap Ward
Party	Candidate	Votes	%	±%
Liberal National	Steven Toomey	15,210	52.44	+1.87
Greens	Ann Aitken	8,026	27.67	+10.71
Labor	Ben Long	5,767	19.88	−10.85
Total formal votes		29,003	98.30	+0.24
Informal votes		502	1.70	−0.24
Turnout		29,505	89.49	+6.44
Two-candidate-preferred result
Liberal National	Steven Toomey	16,054	60.16	+3.06
Greens	Ann Aitken	10,632	39.84	+39.84
Liberal National hold		Swing	+3.06	

=== Walter Taylor ===
2024 Queensland local elections: Walter Taylor Ward
Party	Candidate	Votes	%	±%
Liberal National	Penny Wolff	13,281	46.68	−0.22
Greens	Michaela Sargent	11,271	39.62	+4.72
Labor	Rebecca Hack	3,897	13.70	−1.60
Total formal votes		28,449	98.61	
Informal votes		402	1.39	
Turnout		28,581	85.79	
Two-candidate-preferred result
Liberal National	Penny Wolff	14,002	51.71	−2.19
Greens	Michaela Sargent	13,075	48.29	+2.19
Liberal National hold		Swing	−2.19	

=== Wynnum Manly ===
2024 Queensland local elections: Wynnum Manly Ward
Party	Candidate	Votes	%	±%
Liberal National	Alexandra Givney	10,813	41.13	+5.13
Labor	Sara Whitmee	8,196	31.17	−22.63
Greens	Bel Ellis	4,049	15.4	+5.2
Independent	Craig Moore	3,234	12.3	+12.3
Total formal votes		26,292	97.58	
Informal votes		652	2.42	
Turnout		26,944	85.08	
Two-party-preferred result
Liberal National	Alex Givney	11,913	51.13	+12.53
Labor	Sara Whitmee	11,385	48.87	−12.53
Liberal National gain from Labor		Swing	+12.53	

== Cairns ==
2024 Queensland local elections: Cairns
Party	Votes	%	Swing	Seats	Change
Cairns Unity				3	▼2
Independent				3	▲1
Team Eden				1	Steady
Independent LNP				1	▲1
Independent Socialist Alliance				1	Steady
Community First				0	Steady
Independent Labor				0	Steady
Independent Democratic				0	Steady

=== Division 1 ===
2024 Queensland local elections: Division 1
Party	Candidate	Votes	%	±%
Cairns Unity	Brett Moller	unopposed		
Cairns Unity hold		Swing		

=== Division 2 ===
2024 Queensland local elections: Division 2
Party	Candidate	Votes	%	±%
Independent LNP	Matthew Tickner	3,137	32.44	
Independent	John Schilling	1,702	17.60	
Cairns Unity	Nikki Giumelli	1,541	15.94	
Independent Labor	Steve Lippingwell	1,530	15.82	
Team Eden	Kesa Strieby	1,160	12.00	
Community First	Patricia Courtenay	600	6.20	
Turnout		10,212	73.48	
Two-candidate-preferred result
Independent LNP gain from Ind. Socialist Alliance		Swing		

- Incumbent councillor Rob Pyne (Ind. Socialist, later Ind. Socialist Alliance) contested Division 5.

=== Division 3 ===
2024 Queensland local elections: Division 3
Party	Candidate	Votes	%	±%
Independent	Cathy Zeiger	6,467	70.04	
Cairns Unity	Heidi Healy	1,604	17.37	
Community First	Marisa Seden	1,162	12.59	
Turnout		9,593	74.80	
Independent hold		Swing		

=== Division 4 ===
2024 Queensland local elections: Division 4
Party	Candidate	Votes	%	±%
Cairns Unity	Jeremy Neal	2,750	32.28	
Team Eden	Trevor Tim	2,591	30.41	
Independent	Cate Mahoney	586	19.73	
Independent Democratic	Shane Cuthbert	545	18.35	
Turnout		8,949	74.18	
Two-candidate-preferred result
Team Eden gain from Cairns Unity		Swing		

=== Division 5 ===
2024 Queensland local elections: Division 5
Party	Candidate	Votes	%	±%
Ind. Socialist Alliance	Rob Pyne	2,296	30.01	
Team Eden	Emma Gelling	1,882	24.59	
Cairns Unity	Nathan Lee Long	1,851	24.19	
Independent	Birgit Ariane Machnitzke	948	12.39	
Independent	James Coll	675	8.82	
Turnout		8,097	63.93	
Two-candidate-preferred result
Ind. Socialist Alliance gain from Team Eden		Swing		

- Incumbent councillor Amy Eden (Independent, later Team Eden) ran for mayor and therefore did not recontest.

=== Division 6 ===
2024 Queensland local elections: Division 6
Party	Candidate	Votes	%	±%
Cairns Unity	Kristy Vallely	3,984	39.52	
Team Eden	Shane Trimby	2,609	25.88	
Community First	Nicole Sleeman	1,981	19.65	
Independent	Alan Benn	1,506	14.94	
Turnout		10,465	82.25	
Two-candidate-preferred result
Cairns Unity hold		Swing		

=== Division 7 ===
2024 Queensland local elections: Division 7
Party	Candidate	Votes	%	±%
Independent	Anna Middleton	2,554	29.08	
Cairns Unity	Matthew Calanna	2,395	27.27	
Community First	Renee Lees	2,130	24.25	
Team Eden	Ian Moller-Nielsen	1,703	19.39	
Turnout		9,273	73.82	
Two-candidate-preferred result
Independent gain from Cairns Unity		Swing		

=== Division 8 ===
2024 Queensland local elections: Division 8
Party	Candidate	Votes	%	±%
Cairns Unity	Rhonda Coghlan	3,155	33.95	
Team Eden	Jo Piggott	2,532	27.25	
Community First	Phillip Musumeci	1,965	21.95	
Independent LNP	Hannah Boon	1,640	17.65	
Turnout		9,942	71.13	
Two-candidate-preferred result
Cairns Unity hold		Swing		

=== Division 9 ===
2024 Queensland local elections: Division 9
Party	Candidate	Votes	%	±%
Independent	Brett Olds	8,029	76.80	
Community First	Carine Visschers	2,425	23.20	
Turnout		10,822	79.45	
Independent hold		Swing		

- Incumbent councillor Brett Olds was elected as Independent LNP but left the LNP in September 2021.

== Cassowary Coast ==
=== Division 1 ===
2024 Queensland local elections: Division 1
Party	Candidate	Votes	%	±%
Independent	Peter Reed	1,467	54.11	+54.11
Independent	Chris Littlemore	1,244	45.89	+45.89
Total formal votes		2,711	96.82	−0.37
Informal votes		89	3.18	+0.37
Turnout		2,800	79.03	−1.77
Independent gain from Independent				

=== Division 2 ===
2024 Queensland local elections: Division 2
Party	Candidate	Votes	%	±%
Independent	Barry Barnes	1,156	41.32	+41.32
Independent	Ellen Jessop	1,121	40.06	+40.06
Independent	Marcus Thomas	521	18.62	+18.62
Total formal votes		2,798	95.53	−0.01
Informal votes		131	4.47	+0.01
Turnout		2,929	78.25	+0.30
Two-candidate-preferred result
Independent	Ellen Jessop			
Independent	Barry Barnes			
Independent gain from Independent				

- Incumbent councillor Teresa Millwood (Independent) ran for mayor and therefore did not recontest.

=== Division 3 ===
2024 Queensland local elections: Division 3
Party	Candidate	Votes	%	±%
Independent	Trudy Tschui	1,681	59.80	+18.04
Independent	Kimberley Wayne	1,130	40.20	+16.80
Total formal votes		2,811	95.71	−1.44
Informal votes		126	4.29	+1.44
Turnout		2,937	74.60	+3.53
Independent hold		Swing	+6.20	

=== Division 4 ===
2024 Queensland local elections: Division 4
Party	Candidate	Votes	%	±%
Independent	Nicholas Pervan	unopposed	N/A	N/A
Independent hold				

=== Division 5 ===
2024 Queensland local elections: Division 5
Party	Candidate	Votes	%	±%
Independent	Jeffrey Baines	unopposed	N/A	N/A
Independent hold				

=== Division 6 ===
2024 Queensland local elections: Division 6
Party	Candidate	Votes	%	±%
Independent	Renee McLeod	unopposed	N/A	N/A
Independent hold				

== Cherbourg ==
2024 Queensland local elections: Cherbourg
Party	Candidate	Votes	%	±%
Independent	Carla Fisher (elected)	169	11.42	
Independent	Thomas Langton (elected)	164	11.08	
Independent	Daniel Weazel (elected)	160	10.81	
Independent	Gordon Wragge (elected)	145	9.80	
Independent	Luella Watson	142	9.59	
Independent	Errol Simpson	139	9.39	
Independent	James Dodd Saltner	123	8.31	
Independent	Fred Cobbo	104	7.03	
Independent	Leighton Costello	92	6.22	
Independent	Bronwyn Murray	88	5.95	
Independent	Elgan Saunders	88	5.95	
Independent	Cindy Button	66	4.46	
Turnout		379	50.00	

== Gold Coast ==
2024 Queensland local elections: Gold Coast
Party	Votes	%	Swing	Seats	Change
Independent	202,972	66.98		7	
Independent LNP	89,919	29.67		7	
Animal Justice	7,942	2.62		0	Steady
Independent UAP	2,222	0.73		0	Steady

=== Division 1 ===
2024 Queensland local elections: Division 1
Party	Candidate	Votes	%	±%
Independent	Mark Hammel	19,347	76.91	+31.12
Animal Justice	Lisa Findlay	5,810	23.09	
Turnout		26,281	77.80	
Independent hold		Swing		

=== Division 2 ===
2024 Queensland local elections: Division 2
Party	Candidate	Votes	%	±%
Independent LNP	Naomi Fowler	18,734	73.35	
Independent	Ben Findlay	6,807	26.65	
Turnout		26,535	81.97	
Independent LNP hold		Swing		

- Incumbent councillor William Owen-Jones (Independent LNP) did not recontest.

=== Division 3 ===
2024 Queensland local elections: Division 3
Party	Candidate	Votes	%	±%
Independent	Donna Gates	15,852	68.01	−8.12
Independent	Michael Banham	5,233	22.45	
Independent UAP	Tamzin Revell	2,222	9.53	
Turnout		24,553	77.15	
Independent hold		Swing		

=== Division 4 ===
2024 Queensland local elections: Division 4
Party	Candidate	Votes	%	±%
Independent LNP	Shelley Curtis	unopposed		
Turnout				
Independent LNP hold		Swing	N/A	

- Incumbent councillor Cameron Caldwell (Independent LNP) did not recontest after winning the 2023 Fadden by-election.

=== Division 5 ===
2024 Queensland local elections: Division 5
Party	Candidate	Votes	%	±%
Independent	Peter Young	15,349	61.83	
Independent	Martin Vincent	5,106	20.57	
Independent	Katherine Brooke	3,797	15.29	
Independent	Craig Bastin	574	2.31	
Turnout		26,104	82.33	
Independent hold		Swing		

=== Division 6 ===
2024 Queensland local elections: Division 6
Party	Candidate	Votes	%	±%
Independent LNP	Brooke Patterson	10,820	50.81	+11.54
Independent	Samantha Delmege	8,422	39.55	
Independent	David E. Woodley	2,055	9.65	
Turnout		22,274	76.52	
Independent LNP hold		Swing		

=== Division 7 ===
2024 Queensland local elections: Division 7
Party	Candidate	Votes	%	±%
Independent LNP	Joe Wilkinson	5,882	24.32	
Independent	Jenna Schroeder	5,311	21.96	
Independent LNP	Ryan Bayldon-Lumsden	5,234	21.64	−39.59
Independent	Joel McInnes	3,285	13.58	
Independent	Edward Sarroff	3,016	12.47	
Independent	Bruce Byatt	1,460	6.04	
Turnout		25,426	80.64	
Two-candidate-preferred result
Independent LNP	Joe Wilkinson	8,410	53.22	
Independent	Jenna Schroeder	7,392	46.78	
Independent LNP gain from Independent LNP		Swing		

=== Division 8 ===
2024 Queensland local elections: Division 8
Party	Candidate	Votes	%	±%
Independent LNP	Bob La Castra	14,463	64.93	+12.34
Independent	Monique Jeremiah	7,813	35.07	
Turnout		23,332	80.92	
Independent LNP hold		Swing		

=== Division 9 ===
2024 Queensland local elections: Division 9
Party	Candidate	Votes	%	±%
Independent	Glenn Tozer	16,589	69.09	+8.70
Independent	Sarah Denny	7,422	30.91	
Turnout		24,947	83.18	
Independent hold		Swing		

- Incumbent councillor Glenn Tozer was elected as Independent LNP but left the LNP in June 2020.

=== Division 10 ===
2024 Queensland local elections: Division 10
Party	Candidate	Votes	%	±%
Independent LNP	Darren Taylor	14,196	60.48	+9.82
Independent	Mona Hecke	9,279	39.52	
Turnout		24,523	75.91	
Independent LNP hold		Swing		

=== Division 11 ===
2024 Queensland local elections: Division 11
Party	Candidate	Votes	%	±%
Independent LNP	Dan Doran	14,189	60.65	
Independent LNP	Nicholas Rone	9,207	39.35	
Turnout		24,798	80.46	
Independent LNP hold		Swing		

- Incumbent councillor Hermann Vorster (Independent LNP) did not recontest.

=== Division 12 ===
2024 Queensland local elections: Division 12
Party	Candidate	Votes	%	±%
Independent	Nick Marshall	8,392	37.73	
Independent	Cathy Osborne	7,450	33.49	+5.53
Independent LNP	Luke Henderson	6,401	28.78	
Turnout		23,228	78.73	
Independent hold		Swing		

- Incumbent councillor Pauline Young (Independent) did not recontest.

=== Division 13 ===
2024 Queensland local elections: Division 13
Party	Candidate	Votes	%	±%
Independent	Josh Martin	12,015	54.84	
Independent	Nikki Archer	9,896	45.16	
Turnout		23,050	78.01	
Independent hold		Swing		

- Incumbent councillor Daphne McDonald (Independent) did not recontest.

=== Division 14 ===
2024 Queensland local elections: Division 14
Party	Candidate	Votes	%	±%
Independent	Gail O'Neill	9,844	45.94	−16.41
Independent	Kath Down	9,451	44.11	
Animal Justice	Benjamin Theakstone	2,132	9.95	
Turnout		22,618	77.05	
Independent hold		Swing		

== Ipswich ==
2024 Queensland local elections: Ipswich
Party	Votes	%	Swing	Seats	Change
Independent Labor	83,359	37.07	−3.34	4	▲2
Independent	43,406	19.30	+2.81	1	Steady
Your Voice of Experience	27,288	12.13	−8.37	2	Steady
Better Brighter Ipswich	23,613	10.50	+10.50	1	▼1
Working For Our Community	21,621	9.61	+9.61	0	Steady
Greens	15,355	6.83	+6.83	0	Steady
Team Sheila Ireland	10,256	4.56	+4.56	0	▼1
Formal votes	224,898	100.0			
Formal ballots	112,449	89.32	+0.58		
Informal ballots	13,450	10.68	−0.58		
Total	125,899	100.0		8	
Registered voters / turnout	155,753	80.83	+2.87		

=== Division 1 ===
2024 Queensland local elections: Division 1
Party	Candidate	Votes	%	±%
Independent Labor	Jacob Madsen (elected)	16,520	30.17	+11.35
Independent Labor	Pye Augustine (elected)	14,306	26.13	+12.94
Independent	Simon Ingram	13,674	24.97	+10.90
Team Sheila Ireland	Josh Addison	10,256	18.73	−0.91
Turnout		31,171	80.43	+2.00
Independent Labor hold		Swing	+11.35	
Independent Labor gain from Team Sheila Ireland		Swing	N/A	

- Incumbent councillor Sheila Ireland (Independent, later Team Sheila Ireland) ran for mayor and therefore did not recontest.
- Josh Addison compared with Sheila Ireland at the 2020 election.

=== Division 2 ===
2024 Queensland local elections: Division 2
Party	Candidate	Votes	%	±%
Your Voice Of Experience	Paul Tully (elected)	13,953	22.68	+0.81
Your Voice Of Experience	Nicole Jonic (elected)	13,335	21.68	+5.58
Working For Community	Helen Youngberry	10,980	17.85	+17.85
Working For Community	Steven Purcell	10,641	17.30	+7.43
Independent Labor	Neetu Singh Suhag	6,476	10.53	+10.53
Independent Labor	Vincent Do	6,133	9.97	+9.97
Turnout		33,850	81.81	+2.91
Your Voice Of Experience hold		Swing	+0.81	
Your Voice Of Experience hold		Swing	+5.58	

=== Division 3 ===
2024 Queensland local elections: Division 3
Party	Candidate	Votes	%	±%
Better Brighter Ipswich	Marnie Doyle (elected)	12,944	22.69	+1.03
Independent	Andrew Antoniolli (elected)	11,387	19.96	+19.96
Better Brighter Ipswich	Andrew Fechner	10,669	18.70	+6.74
Greens	Danielle Mutton	7,805	13.68	+13.68
Greens	Tracey Nayler	7,550	13.23	+13.23
Independent	David Box	6,695	11.74	+2.44
Turnout		31,850	79.30	+3.49
Better Brighter Ipswich hold		Swing	+1.03	
Independent gain from Better Brighter Ipswich		Swing	N/A	

- Incumbent councillors Marnie Doyle and Andrew Fechner (both independents) formed Better Brighter Ipswich in 2024.

=== Division 4 ===
2024 Queensland local elections: Division 4
Party	Candidate	Votes	%	±%
Independent Labor	Jim Madden (elected)	15,950	30.93	+30.93
Independent Labor	David Cullen (elected)	13,378	25.94	+25.94
Independent	Russell Milligan	11,650	22.59	+4.49
Independent Labor	Sue Dunne	10,596	20.55	+3.05
Turnout		29,028	81.87	+2.98
Independent Labor hold		Swing	N/A	
Independent Labor gain from Independent		Swing	N/A	

- Incumbent councillor Kate Kunzelmann (Independent Labor) did not recontest.

== Livingstone ==
2024 Queensland local elections: Livingstone
Party	Candidate	Votes	%	±%
Independent	Glenda Mather (elected)	12,635	9.07	
Independent	Pat Eastwood (elected)	11,975	8.59	
Independent	Lance Warcon (elected)	11,323	8.12	
Independent	Rhodes Watson (elected)	10,936	7.85	
Independent	Andrea Friend (elected)	10,816	7.76	
Independent	Wade Rothery (elected)	10,285	7.38	
Independent	Trish Bowman	10,283	7.38	
Independent	Bill Ludwig	10,246	7.35	
Independent	Helen Schweikert	9,629	6.91	
Independent	Jillian Neyland	7,300	5.24	
Independent	Kristan Casuscelli	6,977	5.01	
Independent	Clint Swadling	6,700	4.81	
Independent	Brett Svendsen	6,459	4.63	
Independent	Cameron Kinsey	4,874	3.50	
Independent	Paul Mitchell	4,840	3.47	
Independent	Mike Decman	4,096	2.94	
Total formal votes		139,374	100.0	
Total formal ballots		23,229	92.09	
Informal ballots		1,995	7.91	
Turnout		25,224		

== Logan ==
=== Division 1 ===
2024 Queensland local elections: Division 1
Party	Candidate	Votes	%	±%
Independent	Lisa Bradley	8,140	58.36	−21.79
Independent	Peta Duffy	3,289	23.58	+23.58
Independent	Alex Fisher	2,520	18.07	+18.07
Total formal votes		14,178	96.20	
Informal votes		560	3.80	
Turnout		14,504		
Independent hold		Swing	−21.79	

=== Division 2 ===
2024 Queensland local elections: Division 2
Party	Candidate	Votes	%	±%
Independent Labor	Teresa Lane	7,605	60.52	
Independent	Reese Preston-Smith	3,085	24.55	
Independent	Jacinta Paper	1,876	14.93	
Total formal votes		12,566	93.07	
Informal votes		935	6.93	
Turnout		13,501		
Independent Labor hold		Swing		

=== Division 3 ===
2024 Queensland local elections: Division 3
Party	Candidate	Votes	%	±%
Independent Labor	Mindy Russell	11,108	84.16	
Independent	Kahil Evens	2,091	15.84	
Total formal votes		13,199	95.83	
Informal votes		639	4.62	
Turnout		13,838		
Independent Labor hold		Swing		

=== Division 4 ===
2024 Queensland local elections: Division 4
Party	Candidate	Votes	%	±%
Independent	Nathan St Ledger	6,430	45.60	+45.60
Independent	Lucy Reilly	4,110	29.14	+29.14
Independent Labor	Joshua Lucey	3,562	25.26	+25.26
Total formal votes		14,102	94.97	
Informal votes		747	5.03	
Turnout		14,849		
Independent gain from Independent		Swing		

- Incumbent Councillor Laurie Koranski (Independent) did not recontest.

=== Division 5 ===
2024 Queensland local elections: Division 5
Party	Candidate	Votes	%	±%
Independent	Paul Jackson	5,301	42.91	+42.91
Independent Labor	Sovannary Uk	4,296	34.77	+34.77
Independent	Zoe McDonnell	2,758	22.32	+22.32
Total formal votes		12,355	93.70	
Informal votes		830	6.30	
Turnout		13,185		
Independent gain from Independent Labor		Swing		

- Incumbent Councillor Jon Raven (Independent Labor) did not recontest in order to run for mayor.

=== Division 6 ===
2024 Queensland local elections: Division 6
Party	Candidate	Votes	%	±%
Independent	Tony Hall	unopposed		
Independent hold		Swing	N/A	

=== Division 7 ===
2024 Queensland local elections: Division 7
Party	Candidate	Votes	%	±%
Independent Labor	Tim Frazer	8,471	62.26	
Independent	Anthony Shorten	5,135	37.74	
Total formal votes		13,606	94.35	
Informal votes		815	5.65	
Turnout		14,421		
Independent Labor hold		Swing		

=== Division 8 ===
2024 Queensland local elections: Division 8
Party	Candidate	Votes	%	±%
Independent	Jacob Heremaia	unopposed		
Independent hold		Swing	N/A	

=== Division 9 ===
2024 Queensland local elections: Division 9
Party	Candidate	Votes	%	±%
Independent	Scott Bannan	unopposed		
Independent hold		Swing	N/A	

=== Division 10 ===
2024 Queensland local elections: Division 10
Party	Candidate	Votes	%	±%
Independent	Miriam Stemp	unopposed		
Independent hold		Swing	N/A	

=== Division 11 ===
2024 Queensland local elections: Division 11
Party	Candidate	Votes	%	±%
Independent	Natalie Willcocks	unopposed		
Independent hold		Swing	N/A	

=== Division 12 ===
2024 Queensland local elections: Division 12
Party	Candidate	Votes	%	±%
Independent	Karen Murphy	6,975	51.34	
Independent	Nate Hamon	6,612	48.66	
Total formal votes		13,587	94.74	
Informal votes		754	5.26	
Turnout		14,341		
Independent hold		Swing		

== Mackay ==
2024 Queensland local elections: Mackay
Party	Candidate	Votes	%	±%
Independent Labor	Belinda Hassan (elected)	26,376	4.16	
Mackay First	George Christensen (elected)	25,556	4.03	
Mackay First	Namarca Corowa (elected)	25,440	4.01	
Independent	Martin Bella (elected)	25,364	4.00	
Independent	Peter Sheedy (elected)	25,118	3.96	
Team Greg Williamson	Ash-Lee Johnson (elected)	24,404	3.85	
Independent	Alison Jones (elected)	24,399	3.84	
Mackay First	Nathenea MacRae (elected)	24,149	3.80	
Mackay First	Heath Paton (elected)	24,084	3.79	
Team Greg Williamson	Karen May (elected)	24,000	3.78	
Team Greg Williamson	Michelle Green	23,941	3.77	
Independent	Pauline Townsend	23,601	3.72	
Mackay First	Melissa Fowler	23,486	3.70	
Independent Labor	Fran Mann	23,118	3.64	
Mackay First	Keith Hicks	22,705	3.58	
Mackay First	Jeff Keioskie	22,390	3.53	
Mackay First	Kylee Stanton	22,274	3.51	
Mackay First	Ian Christensen	21,831	3.44	
Team Greg Williamson	Neil Wallace	21,730	3.42	
Mackay First	Lindsay Temple	21,222	3.34	
Independent	Justin Englert	19,432	3.06	
Independent	Greg Fisher	19,076	3.01	
Team Greg Williamson	Peter Freeleagus	18,902	2.98	
Independent	Russell Seymour	18,063	2.85	
Independent	Kimberly Doyle	17,805	2.81	
Team Greg Williamson	Stephen Cutting	17,792	2.80	
Independent	Les Scott	17,462	2.75	
Team Greg Williamson	Joshua Thornton	17,370	2.74	
Independent LNP	Ian Rowan	13,580	2.14	
Turnout		73,008	82.16	
Party total votes
Mackay First		233,137	36.73	+36.73
Independent		190,320	29.98	
Team Greg Williamson		148,139	23.34	
Independent Labor		49,494	7.80	
Independent LNP		13,580	2.14	
Party total seats			Seats	±
Mackay First			4	▲4
Independent			3	▼1
Team Greg Williamson			2	▼4
Independent Labor			1	▲1

- Team Greg Williamson changed compared with Greg Williamson Alliance at 2020 election.
- Belinda Hassan was elected as Greg Williamson Alliance but became Independent Labor in December 2023.
- Fran Mann was elected as Greg Williamson Alliance but became Independent Labor in December 2023.
- Justin Englert was elected as Greg Williamson Alliance but became independent in December 2023.
- Pauline Townsend was elected as Greg Williamson Alliance but became independent in December 2023.

== Mapoon ==
2024 Queensland local elections: Mapoon
Party	Candidate	Votes	%	±%
Independent	Allena Tabuai			
Independent	Janelle Ling			
Independent	Linda McLachlan			
Independent	Eli Tabuai			
Independent	Maria Pitt			
Independent	Justina Reid			
Independent	Sheree Jia			
Turnout				

== McKinlay ==
2024 Queensland local elections: McKinlay
Party	Candidate	Votes	%	±%
Independent	Fiona Malone			
Independent	Shauna Royes			
Independent	Michele Zadow			
Independent	Sheree Pratt			
Independent	John Lynch			
Independent	Amanda Stevens			
Independent	Luke Spreadborough			
Turnout				

== Moreton Bay ==
2024 Queensland local elections: Moreton Bay
Party	Votes	%	Swing	Seats	Change
Independent	87,701	56.81		10	Steady
Independent Labor	24,169	15.66		2	Steady
Community Centred and Connected	16,715	10.83		0	Steady
Independent LNP	10,274	6.65		0	Steady
Greens	8,939	5.79		0	Steady
Independent Democrat	3,322	2.15		0	Steady
Animal Justice	3,240	2.10		0	Steady
Formal votes	154,360	92.42			
Informal votes	12,664	7.58			
Total	167,024	100.0			

=== Division 1 ===
2024 Queensland local elections: Division 1
Party	Candidate	Votes	%	±%
Independent	Brooke Savige	unopposed		
Independent hold		Swing	N/A	

=== Division 2 ===
2024 Queensland local elections: Division 2
Party	Candidate	Votes	%	±%
Independent	Mark Booth	20,267	86.22	+47.50
Animal Justice	Gregory Dillon	3,240	13.78	+13.78
Turnout		24,731	79.79	
Independent hold		Swing	+47.50	

=== Division 3 ===
2024 Queensland local elections: Division 3
Party	Candidate	Votes	%	±%
Independent	Adam Hain	14,614	64.58	+6.31
Community Centred	Kerri-Maree Raedel	8,017	35.42	
Turnout		23,903	76.92	
Independent hold		Swing	+6.31	

=== Division 4 ===
2024 Queensland local elections: Division 4
Party	Candidate	Votes	%	±%
Independent	Jodie Shipway	unopposed		
Independent hold		Swing	N/A	

=== Division 5 ===
2024 Queensland local elections: Division 5
Party	Candidate	Votes	%	±%
Independent	Sandra Ruck	11,716	50.15	
Independent LNP	Dean Teasdale	8,934	38.24	
Independent	Garry Ohlson	2,712	11.61	
Turnout		24,796	80.36	
Two-candidate-preferred result
Independent	Sandra Ruck	12,393	56.52	
Independent LNP	Dean Teasdale	9,535	43.48	
Independent hold		Swing		

=== Division 6 ===
2024 Queensland local elections: Division 6
Party	Candidate	Votes	%	±%
Independent Labor	Karl Winchester	15,836	71.27	
Greens	Benita Suckling	6,384	28.73	
Turnout		23,286	80.70	
Independent Labor hold		Swing		

=== Division 7 ===
2024 Queensland local elections: Division 7
Party	Candidate	Votes	%	±%
Independent	Yvonne Barlow	unopposed		
Independent hold		Swing	N/A	

- Barlow was elected at a 2021 by-election following resignation of Denise Sims (Independent).

=== Division 8 ===
2024 Queensland local elections: Division 8
Party	Candidate	Votes	%	±%
Independent Labor	Jim Moloney	8,333	39.43	
Independent	Jamie Walter	5,689	26.92	
Independent	Sue Laird	3,219	15.23	
Greens	Tara Seiffert-Smith	2,555	12.09	
Independent LNP	Stephen Huxtable	1,340	6.34	
Turnout		22,203	82.27	
Independent Labor hold		Swing		

- Incumbent councillor Mick Gillam (Independent Labor) did not recontest.

=== Division 9 ===
2024 Queensland local elections: Division 9
Party	Candidate	Votes	%	±%
Independent	Cath Tonks	unopposed		
Independent hold		Swing	N/A	

=== Division 10 ===
2024 Queensland local elections: Division 10
Party	Candidate	Votes	%	±%
Independent	Matt Constance	14,799	65.29	
Greens	Brent McDowall	4,544	20.05	
Independent Democrat	Andrew Murphy	3,322	14.66	
Turnout		23,403	87.69	
Two-candidate-preferred result
Independent	Matt Constance	15,969	75.69	
Greens	Brent McDowall	5,128	24.31	
Independent hold		Swing		

=== Division 11 ===
2024 Queensland local elections: Division 11
Party	Candidate	Votes	%	±%
Independent	Darren Grimwade	unopposed		
Independent hold		Swing	N/A	

=== Division 12 ===
2024 Queensland local elections: Division 12
Party	Candidate	Votes	%	±%
Independent	Tony Latter	12,367	52.69	
Community Centred	Adrian Raedel	8,698	37.20	
Independent	Errol O'Brien	2,318	9.91	
Turnout		24,702	82.59	
Two-candidate-preferred result
Independent	Tony Latter	12,910	58.38	
Community Centred	Adrian Raedel	9,205	41.62	
Independent hold		Swing		

=== 2025 Division 11 by-election ===
2025 Division 11 by-election (27 September 2025)
Party	Candidate	Votes	%	±%
Independent	Ellie Smith	10,304	48.22	
Independent LNP	Dean Clements	4,972	23.27	
Independent	Paul Smith	2,035	9.52	
Independent Labor	Carl Enchelmaier	1,773	8.30	
Independent	Mal Gibson	1,132	5.30	
Independent	Clayton Connor	589	2.76	
Independent	Caleb Wells	565	2.64	
Total formal votes		21,370	98.35	
Informal votes		359	1.65	
Turnout		21,729	74.80	
Two-candidate-preferred result
Independent	Ellie Smith	11,305	65.67	
Independent LNP	Dean Clements	5,910	34.33	
Independent gain from Independent LNP		Swing	N/A	

- By-election held following resignation of Darren Grimwade (Independent) on 10 July 2025

|}

== Napranum ==
2024 Queensland local elections: Napranum
Party	Candidate	Votes	%	±%
Independent	Margie Adidi			
Independent	Egito Mairu			
Independent	Rex Burke			
Independent	Tam Wees			
Independent	Ernest Madua Jnr			
Independent	Robert Wigness			
Turnout				

== Noosa ==
2024 Queensland local elections: Noosa
Party	Candidate	Votes	%	±%
Independent	Amelia Lorenston (elected)	17,494	9.11	
Independent	Jess Phillips (elected)	17,416	9.07	
Independent Labor	Nicola Wilson (elected)	17,159	8.94	
Independent Labor	Brian Stockwell (elected)	15,685	8.17	
Independent	Tom Wegener (elected)	15,584	8.12	
Independent	Karen Finzel (elected)	15,248	7.94	
Independent LNP	Alecia Staines	15,120	7.88	
Independent LNP	Leigh McCready	15,096	7.86	
Independent	Finoa Jacobs	14,353	7.48	
Independent	Joe Jurisevic	14,275	7.43	
Independent	Chris Darwen	11,420	5.95	
Independent	Mat Bankes	8,467	4.41	
Independent	Andrea Newland	8,289	4.32	
Independent	Michelle Ngatai-Stokes	6,394	3.33	
Turnout		35,633		

== Richmond ==
2024 Queensland local elections: Richmond
Party	Candidate	Votes	%	±%
Independent	Nick Buick	253	11.05	
Independent	Judy Brown	281	12.27	
Independent	Clay Kennedy	170	7.42	
Independent	Will Guy	197	8.60	
Independent	Terry Flute	372	16.24	
Independent	Megan Easton	277	12.10	
Independent	Sherreen Johnston	347	15.15	
Independent	Patsy-Ann Fox	393	17.16	
Turnout		2,290		

== Rockhampton ==
=== Division 1 ===
2024 Queensland local elections: Division 1
Party	Candidate	Votes	%	±%
Independent	Shane Latcham	unopposed		
Independent hold		Swing		

=== Division 2 ===
2024 Queensland local elections: Division 2
Party	Candidate	Votes	%	±%
Independent	Neil Fisher	3,591	54.97	
Independent	Elliot Hilse	2,942	45.03	
Total formal votes		6,533	95.99	
Informal votes		273	4.01	
Independent hold		Swing		

=== Division 3 ===
2024 Queensland local elections: Division 3
Party	Candidate	Votes	%	±%
Independent	Grant Mathers	unopposed		
Independent hold		Swing		

=== Division 4 ===
2024 Queensland local elections: Division 4
Party	Candidate	Votes	%	±%
Independent	Edward Oram	3,972	54.67	
Independent	Ellen Smith	3,293	45.33	
Total formal votes		7,265	95.83	
Informal votes		316	4.17	
Independent gain from Independent		Swing		

=== Division 5 ===
2024 Queensland local elections: Division 5
Party	Candidate	Votes	%	±%
Independent	Cherie Rutherford	unopposed		
Independent hold		Swing		

=== Division 6 ===
2024 Queensland local elections: Division 6
Party	Candidate	Votes	%	±%
Independent Labor	Drew Wickerson	unopposed		
Independent Labor hold		Swing		

=== Division 7 ===
2024 Queensland local elections: Division 7
Party	Candidate	Votes	%	±%
Independent	Marika Taylor	3,304	52.20	
Independent	David Bond	1,337	21.12	
Independent Labor	Will Field	1,009	15.94	
Independent	Jamie Scott	679	10.73	
Total formal votes		6,329	94.92	
Informal votes		339	5.08	
Independent hold		Swing		

== Townsville ==
=== Division 1 ===
2024 Queensland local elections: Division 1
Party	Candidate	Votes	%	±%
TownsvilleCHANGE	Paul Jacob	6,669	55.99	
Team Jenny Hill	Margie Ryder	5,327	44.41	
Turnout		12,462	80.93	
TownsvilleCHANGE gain from Team Jenny Hill		Swing		

=== Division 2 ===
2024 Queensland local elections: Division 2
Party	Candidate	Votes	%	±%
Independent	Brodie Phillips	6,888	62.48	
Team Jenny Hill	Shari Fabbro	2,797	25.36	
TownsvilleCHANGE	Jai Philpots	1,343	12.18	
Turnout		11,400	80.32	
Two-candidate-preferred result
Independent	Brodie Phillips	7,346	71.72	
Team Jenny Hill	Shari Fabbro	2,897	28.28	
Independent hold		Swing		

- Incumbent councillor Sue Blom (Independent) did not recontest.

=== Division 3 ===
2024 Queensland local elections: Division 3
Party	Candidate	Votes	%	±%
Team Jenny Hill	Ann-Maree Greaney	4,971	47.46	
Independent	Alan Sheret	2,803	26.76	
TownsvilleCHANGE	Jake Farrell	2,701	25.79	
Turnout		10,909	75.04	
Two-candidate-preferred result
Team Jenny Hill	Ann-Maree Greaney	5,305	58.87	
Independent	Alan Sheret	3,706	41.83	
Team Jenny Hill hold		Swing		

=== Division 4 ===
2024 Queensland local elections: Division 4
Party	Candidate	Votes	%	±%
Independent	Kristian Price	5,637	54.78	
Team Jenny Hill	Mark Molachino	4,653	45.22	
Turnout		10,716	75.14	
Independent gain from Team Jenny Hill		Swing		

=== Division 5 ===
2024 Queensland local elections: Division 5
Party	Candidate	Votes	%	±%
TownsvilleCHANGE	Vera Dirou	5,478	51.03	
Team Jenny Hill	Russ Cook	5,256	48.97	
Turnout		11,115	80.47	
TownsvilleCHANGE gain from Team Jenny Hill		Swing		

=== Division 6 ===
2024 Queensland local elections: Division 6
Party	Candidate	Votes	%	±%
Team Jenny Hill	Suzy Batkovic	unopposed		
Registered electors				
Team Jenny Hill hold		Swing		

=== Division 7 ===
2024 Queensland local elections: Division 7
Party	Candidate	Votes	%	±%
Team Jenny Hill	Kurt Rehbein	unopposed		
Registered electors				
Team Jenny Hill hold		Swing		

=== Division 8 ===
2024 Queensland local elections: Division 8
Party	Candidate	Votes	%	±%
Team Jenny Hill	Rachael Armstrong	4,164	40.45	
Independent	Andrew Robinson	3,717	36.11	
TownsvilleCHANGE	Guy Reece	2,412	23.43	
Turnout		10,732	77.95	
Two-candidate-preferred result
Independent	Andrew Robinson	4,524	50.64	
Team Jenny Hill	Rachael Armstrong	4,409	49.36	
Independent gain from Team Jenny Hill		Swing		

=== Division 9 ===
2024 Queensland local elections: Division 9
Party	Candidate	Votes	%	±%
Team Jenny Hill	Liam Mooney	3,721	37.87	
Independent	Erica Keam	2,811	28.61	
Independent	Michael Edmonds	1,844	18.77	
Greens	Benjamin Tiley	1,450	14.76	
Turnout		10,162	75.09	
Two-candidate-preferred result
Team Jenny Hill	Liam Mooney	4,183	52.62	
Independent	Erica Keam	3,767	47.38	
Team Jenny Hill hold		Swing		

=== Division 10 ===
2024 Queensland local elections: Division 10
Party	Candidate	Votes	%	±%
Independent LNP	Brady Ellis	4,776	44.06	
Team Jenny Hill	Ben Fusco	4,355	40.18	
Independent	Kate Annetts	1,709	15.77	
Turnout		11,101	81.20	
Two-candidate-preferred result
Independent LNP	Brady Ellis	5,323	53.84	
Team Jenny Hill	Ben Fusco	4,563	46.16	
Independent LNP gain from NQ State Alliance		Swing		

- Won by NQ State Alliance at a 2021 by-election after resignation of Les Walker (Team Jenny Hill)
- Incumbent councillor Fran O'Callaghan (NQ State Alliance) did not recontest.
