= 2024 Queensland mayoral elections =

- 16 March 2024

63 of the 77 mayors in Queensland (14 elected unopposed)
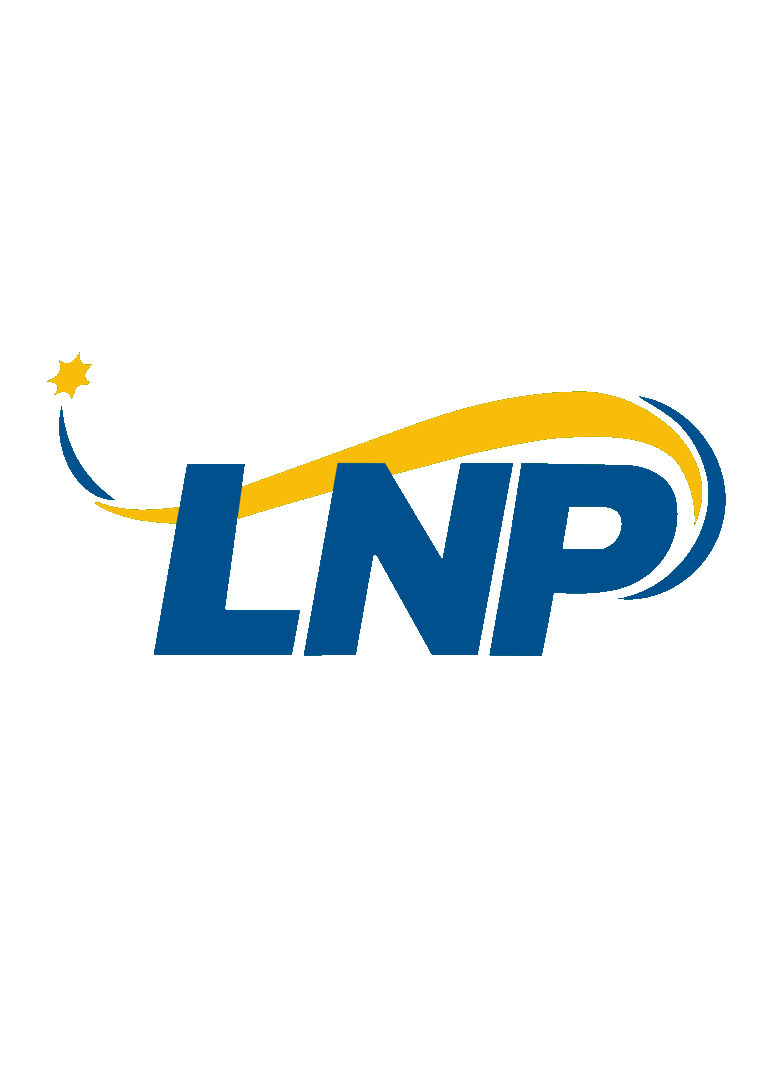
	First party	Second party
	IND
Party	Independents	Liberal National
Last election	69 mayors	1 mayor
Seats won	63	1
Seat change	▼9	Steady

The 2024 Queensland mayoral elections was held on 16 March 2024 to elect the mayors of the 77 local government areas in Queensland The elections were held as part of the statewide local elections. 14 mayors were elected unopposed.

== Background ==
Karen Williams, the mayor of Redland, joined the Liberal National Party in 2021.

Scenic Rim mayor Greg Christensen resigned from the LNP on 26 April 2023.

Bob Manning, the mayor of Cairns, announced his retirement as mayor on 17 November 2023. Councillor Terry James was elected as mayor by a vote of fellow councillors on 22 November 2023 to serve the remainder of Manning's term.

== Results ==
=== Aurukun ===
2024 Queensland mayoral elections: Aurukun
Party	Candidate	Votes	%	±%
Independent	Barbara Sue Bandicootcha	242	43.37	+18.69
Independent	Keri Tamwoy	192	34.41	−21.06
Independent	Dereck Walpo	124	22.22	+2.37
Total formal votes		558	99.11	−0.15
Informal votes		5	0.89	+0.15
Turnout		563	60.28	−6.76
Two-candidate-preferred result
Independent	Barbara Sue Bandicootcha	254	55.46	+24.24
Independent	Keri Tamwoy	204	44.54	−24.24
Independent gain from Independent		Swing	+24.24	

=== Balonne ===
2024 Queensland mayoral elections: Balonne
Party	Candidate	Votes	%	±%
Independent	Samantha O'Toole	unopposed		
Independent hold		Swing	N/A	

=== Banana ===
2024 Queensland mayoral elections: Banana
Party	Candidate	Votes	%	±%
Independent	Neville Ferrier	unopposed		
Independent hold		Swing	N/A	

=== Barcaldine ===
2024 Queensland mayoral elections: Barcaldine
Party	Candidate	Votes	%	±%
Independent	Rob Chandler	783	45.26	+9.53
Independent	Gary Peoples	722	41.73	+41.73
Independent Labor	Sharon Broughton	225	13.01	+7.19
Total formal votes		1,730	99.31	+0.05
Informal votes		12	0.69	−0.05
Turnout		1,742	80.50	−4.89
Two-candidate-preferred result
Independent	Rob Chandler	823	51.63	+5.57
Independent	Gary Peoples	771	48.37	+48.37
Independent gain from Independent LNP		Swing	N/A	

=== Barcoo ===
2024 Queensland mayoral elections: Barcoo
Party	Candidate	Votes	%	±%
Independent	Sally O'Neil	123	71.93	+11.70
Independent	Steve Sigler	48	28.07	+28.07
Total formal votes		171	98.84	0.00
Informal votes		2	1.16	0.00
Turnout		173	74.89	−7.89
Independent hold		Swing		

=== Blackall-Tambo ===
2024 Queensland mayoral elections: Blackall-Tambo
Party	Candidate	Votes	%	±%
Independent LNP	Andrew Martin	976	81.13	+16.21
Independent	Michael Ellison	227	18.87	+18.87
Total formal votes		1,203	99.26	−0.17
Informal votes		9	0.74	+0.17
Turnout		1,212	81.67	−4.95
Independent LNP hold		Swing		

=== Boulia ===
2024 Queensland mayoral elections: Boulia
Party	Candidate	Votes	%	±%
Independent	Eric (Rick) Britton	unopposed		
Independent hold		Swing	N/A	

=== Brisbane ===
2024 Queensland mayoral elections: Brisbane
Party	Candidate	Votes	%	±%
Liberal National	Adrian Schrinner	343,330	48.59	+0.85
Labor	Tracey Price	186,250	26.36	−4.58
Greens	Jonathan Sriranganathan	137,454	19.45	+4.05
Legalise Cannabis	Clive Brazier	23,580	3.34	+3.34
Independent	Bruce Tanti	10,070	1.43	+1.43
Independent	Gilbert Holmes	5,958	0.84	+0.84
Total formal votes		706,642	97.97	+0.66
Informal votes		14,656	2.03	−0.66
Turnout		721,298	85.31	
Two-party-preferred result
Liberal National	Adrian Schrinner	362,411	56.35	+0.03
Labor	Tracey Price	280,696	43.65	−0.03
Liberal National hold		Swing	+0.03	

=== Bulloo ===
2024 Queensland mayoral elections: Bulloo
Party	Candidate	Votes	%	±%
Independent	John (Tractor) Ferguson	82	44.32	−21.02
Independent	Jimmy Abbot	43	23.24	+23.24
Independent	Shirley Girdler	31	16.76	+16.76
Independent	Vaughan Collins	29	15.68	+15.68
Total formal votes		185	98.93	−0.51
Informal votes		2	1.07	+0.51
Turnout		187	84.23	−3.83
Two-candidate-preferred result
Independent	John (Tractor) Ferguson	89	64.96	−2.29
Independent	Jimmy Abbot	48	35.04	+35.04
Independent hold		Swing	N/A	

=== Bundaberg ===
2024 Queensland mayoral elections: Bundaberg
Party	Candidate	Votes	%	±%
Independent	Helen Blackburn	37,627	58.05	+26.39
Independent	Jack Dempsey	20,905	32.25	−32.91
Independent	Levi Horvath	6,281	9.69	+9.69
Total formal votes		64,813	97.00	−0.21
Informal votes		2,007	3.00	+0.21
Turnout		66,820	85.97	+4.50
Two-candidate-preferred result
Independent	Helen Blackburn	39,295	64.40	+31.40
Independent	Jack Dempsey	21,721	35.60	−31.40
Independent gain from Independent		Swing	+31.40	

=== Burdekin ===
2024 Queensland mayoral elections: Burdekin
Party	Candidate	Votes	%	±%
Independent	Pierina Dalle Cort	5,533	52.77	+20.45
Independent	Lyn McLaughlin	4,953	47.23	−1.69
Total formal votes		10,486	98.07	−0.31
Informal votes		206	1.93	+0.31
Turnout		10,692	87.30	+2.67
Independent gain from Independent		Swing		

=== Burke ===
2024 Queensland mayoral elections: Burke
Party	Candidate	Votes	%	±%
Independent	Ernie Camp	unopposed		
Independent hold		Swing	N/A	

=== Cairns ===
2024 Queensland mayoral elections: Cairns
Party	Candidate	Votes	%	±%
Team Eden	Amy Eden	25,782	30.70	+30.70
Cairns Unity	Terry James	20,187	24.04	−42.93
Independent	Paul Taylor	19,532	23.26	+23.26
Community First	Denis Walls	10,745	12.79	+12.79
Independent	John Kel	3,854	4.59	+4.59
Independent	Leah Potter	2,747	3.27	+3.27
Independent	Warren Binda	1,139	1.36	+1.36
Turnout		88,650	75.39	+4.83
Two-candidate-preferred result
Team Eden	Amy Eden	30,364	56.64	+56.64
Cairns Unity	Terry James	23,242	43.36	−37.89
Team Eden gain from Cairns Unity		Swing	N/A	

=== Carpentaria ===
2024 Queensland mayoral elections: Carpentaria
Party	Candidate	Votes	%	±%
Independent	Jack Bawden	539	64.01	−6.77
Independent	Ashley Gallagher	303	35.99	+35.99
Total formal votes		842	98.48	−1.12
Informal votes		13	1.52	+1.12
Turnout		855	68.84	−2.68
Independent hold		Swing		

=== Cassowary Coast ===
2024 Queensland mayoral elections: Cassowary Coast
Party	Candidate	Votes	%	±%
Independent	Teresa Millwood	10,038	61.49	+61.49
Independent	Mark Nolan	6,287	38.51	+0.24
Total formal votes		16,325	96.35	−0.91
Informal votes		619	3.65	+0.91
Turnout		16,944	78.43	+0.55
Independent gain from Independent				

=== Central Highlands ===
2024 Queensland mayoral elections: Central Highlands
Party	Candidate	Votes	%	±%
Independent	Janice Moriarty	7,666	59.11	+59.11
Independent	Kerry Hayes	5,302	40.89	+40.89
Total formal votes		12,968	96.67	+96.67
Informal votes		447	3.33	+3.33
Turnout		13,415	74.22	
Independent gain from Independent				

=== Charters Towers ===
2024 Queensland mayoral elections: Charters Towers
Party	Candidate	Votes	%	±%
Independent LNP	Liz Schmidt	2,641	41.41	+2.12
Independent LNP	Frank Beveridge	2,637	41.35	−1.22
Independent	Tony McDonald	1,100	17.25	−0.89
Total formal votes		6,378	97.31	+0.07
Informal votes		176	2.69	−0.07
Turnout		6,554	80.29	+0.48
Two-candidate-preferred result
Independent LNP	Liz Schmidt	2,847	50.45	+2.96
Independent LNP	Frank Beveridge	2,796	49.55	−2.96
Independent LNP gain from Independent LNP		Swing	+2.96	

=== Cherbourg ===
2024 Queensland mayoral elections: Cherbourg
Party	Candidate	Votes	%	±%
Independent	Bruce Simpson	200	52.91	+52.91
Independent	Elvie Sandow	100	26.46	−5.62
Independent	Arnold Murray	78	20.63	+13.08
Total formal votes		378	99.74	+0.01
Informal votes		1	0.26	−0.01
Turnout		379	50.00	−27.18
Two-candidate-preferred result
Independent	Bruce Simpson	203	66.56	+66.56
Independent	Elvie Sandow	102	33.44	−23.47
Independent gain from Independent		Swing	N/A	

=== Cloncurry ===
2024 Queensland mayoral elections: Cloncurry
Party	Candidate	Votes	%	±%
Independent	Greg Campbell	834	68.53	+68.53
Independent	Jen Sackley	383	31.47	+31.47
Total formal votes		1,217	98.94	+98.94
Informal votes		13	1.06	+1.06
Turnout		1,230	63.93	
Independent hold				

=== Cook ===
2024 Queensland mayoral elections: Cook
Party	Candidate	Votes	%	±%
Independent	Robyn Holmes	988	53.29	+53.29
Independent	Kenny Reid	547	29.50	+29.50
Independent	Ian Murray	319	17.21	+17.21
Total formal votes		1,854	97.73	−0.32
Informal votes		43	2.27	+0.32
Turnout		1,897	64.83	−1.77
Two-candidate-preferred result
Independent	Robyn Holmes	1,043	63.37	+63.37
Independent	Kenny Reid	603	36.63	+36.63
Independent gain from Independent		Swing	N/A	

=== Croydon ===
2024 Queensland mayoral elections: Croydon
Party	Candidate	Votes	%	±%
Independent	Trevor Pickering	96	62.34	+0.80
Independent	Jarrod Antony Pickering	58	37.66	+37.66
Total formal votes		154	99.35	+0.87
Informal votes		1	0.65	−0.87
Turnout		155	82.45	+3.41
Independent hold				

=== Diamantina ===
2024 Queensland mayoral elections: Diamantina
Party	Candidate	Votes	%	±%
Independent	Francis Murray	unopposed		
Independent hold		Swing	N/A	

=== Doomadgee ===
2024 Queensland mayoral elections: Doomadgee
Party	Candidate	Votes	%	±%
Independent	Fredrick O'Keefe	143	32.57	+8.44
Independent	Byron Diamond	74	16.86	+16.86
Independent	Clarence Walden	71	16.17	+2.47
Independent	Myron Johnny	41	9.34	+9.34
Independent	Dean Jupiter	33	7.52	−2.50
Independent	Tony William Douglas	31	7.06	−7.66
Independent	Athol Walden	24	5.47	+5.47
Independent	Stephen McNamee	22	5.01	+5.01
Total formal votes		439	98.65	−1.15
Informal votes		6	1.35	+1.15
Turnout		445	60.22	−14.93
Two-candidate-preferred result
Independent	Fredrick O'Keefe	154	62.60	+13.21
Independent	Clarence Walden	92	37.40	+37.40
Independent gain from Independent		Swing	N/A	

=== Douglas ===
2024 Queensland mayoral elections: Douglas
Party	Candidate	Votes	%	±%
Independent	Lisa Scomazzon	3,427	48.38	+48.38
Independent	David Haratsis	3,150	44.47	+44.47
Independent	Stacy Wilkinson	506	7.14	+7.14
Total formal votes		7,083	97.27	−0.85
Informal votes		199	2.73	+0.85
Turnout		7,282	77.90	+2.27
Two-candidate-preferred result
Independent	Lisa Scomazzon	3,476	52.02	+52.02
Independent	David Haratsis	3,206	47.98	+47.98
Independent gain from Independent		Swing	N/A	

=== Etheridge ===
2024 Queensland mayoral elections: Etheridge
Party	Candidate	Votes	%	±%
Independent	Barry Hughes	unopposed		
Independent hold		Swing	N/A	

=== Flinders ===
2024 Queensland mayoral elections: Flinders
Party	Candidate	Votes	%	±%
Independent	Kate Peddle	475	50.11	+50.11
Independent LNP	Jane McNamara	473	49.89	+7.05
Total formal votes		948	99.58	+0.13
Informal votes		4	0.42	−0.13
Turnout		952	79.20	+0.36
Independent gain from Independent LNP				

=== Fraser Coast ===
2024 Queensland mayoral elections: Fraser Coast
Party	Candidate	Votes	%	±%
Independent Labor	George Seymour	54,100	74.89	−2.88
Independent	Grant Reynolds	18,138	25.11	+25.11
Total formal votes		72,238	95.70	−0.22
Informal votes		3,248	4.30	+0.22
Turnout		75,486	84.29	+5.29
Independent Labor hold				

=== Gladstone ===
2024 Queensland mayoral elections: Gladstone
Party	Candidate	Votes	%	±%
Independent	Matt Burnett	unopposed		
Independent hold		Swing	N/A	

=== Gold Coast ===
2024 Queensland mayoral elections: Gold Coast
Party	Candidate	Votes	%	±%
Independent LNP	Tom Tate	170,150	51.82	−3.91
Independent	Eddy Sarroff	68,061	20.73	+20.73
Independent	Danielle Dunsmore	25,983	7.91	+7.91
Animal Justice	Jennifer Horsburgh	18,130	5.52	+5.52
Independent	Rosie Foster	14,642	4.46	+4.46
Independent	Lavinia Rampino	9,137	2.78	+2.78
Independent LNP	Virginia Freebody	7,800	2.38	−3.23
Independent	Brett Lambert	7,581	2.31	−3.97
Independent	Gary Pead	6,846	2.09	−0.43
Total formal votes		328,330	95.45	+0.86
Informal votes		15,641	4.55	−0.86
Turnout		343,971	79.94	+5.82
Two-candidate-preferred result
Independent LNP	Tom Tate	177,666	66.32	−0.61
Independent	Eddy Sarroff	90,218	33.68	+33.68
Independent LNP hold				

=== Goondiwindi ===
2024 Queensland mayoral elections: Goondiwindi
Party	Candidate	Votes	%	±%
Independent LNP	Lawrence Springborg	unopposed		
Registered electors		7,911		
Independent LNP hold		Swing	N/A	

=== Gympie ===
2024 Queensland mayoral elections: Gympie
Party	Candidate	Votes	%	±%
Independent	Glen Hartwig	18,756	54.55	+3.70
Independent	Naomi Wilson	8,731	25.39	+25.39
Independent	Mark McDonald	6,897	20.06	+20.06
Total formal votes		34,384	95.71	−0.90
Informal votes		1,542	4.29	+0.90
Turnout		35,926	84.40	+4.65
Two-candidate-preferred result
Independent	Glen Hartwig	19,884	65.98	+5.44
Independent	Naomi Wilson	10,254	34.02	+34.02
Independent hold		Swing	N/A	

=== Hinchinbrook ===
2024 Queensland mayoral elections: Hinchinbrook
Party	Candidate	Votes	%	±%
Independent	Ramon Jayo	unopposed		
Independent hold		Swing	N/A	

=== Hope Vale ===
2024 Queensland mayoral elections: Hope Vale
Party	Candidate	Votes	%	±%
Independent	Jason Woibo	74	17.49	−16.09
Independent	Bruce Gibson	70	16.55	+16.55
Independent	June Pearson	65	15.37	+15.37
Independent	Bruce Woibo	48	11.35	+11.35
Independent	Preston Deemal	47	11.11	+11.11
Independent	Neville Bowen	43	10.17	+10.17
Independent	Trevor Shane Gibson	35	8.27	+0.43
Independent	Stephen Wallace	30	7.09	−3.45
Independent	Timothy McGreen	11	2.60	+2.60
Total formal votes		423	97.47	−1.32
Informal votes		11	2.53	+1.32
Turnout		434	60.96	−9.52
Two-candidate-preferred result
Independent	Bruce Gibson	96	51.06	+51.06
Independent	Jason Woibo	92	48.94	−18.15
Independent gain from Independent		Swing	N/A	

=== Ipswich ===
2024 Queensland mayoral elections: Ipswich
Party	Candidate	Votes	%	±%
Independent LNP	Teresa Harding	54,721	45.62	+4.51
Independent	David Martin	38,029	31.70	+8.04
Team Sheila Ireland	Sheila Ireland	12,857	10.72	+10.72
Independent	Peter Robinson	8,338	6.95	+6.95
Independent	Ken Salter	3,428	2.86	+2.86
Independent	Karakan Kochardy	2,576	2.15	+0.64
Turnout		126,812	81.42	
Two-candidate-preferred result
Independent LNP	Teresa Harding	58,413	57.73	−5.25
Independent	David Martin	42,771	42.27	+5.25
Independent LNP hold		Swing		

=== Isaac ===
2024 Queensland mayoral elections: Isaac
Party	Candidate	Votes	%	±%
Independent Labor	Kelly Vea Vea	unopposed		
Independent Labor gain from Independent		Swing	N/A	

- Incumbent mayor Anne Baker (Independent) did not recontest

=== Kowanyama ===
2024 Queensland mayoral elections: Kowanyama
Party	Candidate	Votes	%	±%
Independent	Territa Chey-Anne Dick	112	26.29	+26.29
Independent	Leslie Gilbert	99	23.24	+23.24
Independent	Aaron Teddy	72	16.90	+2.88
Independent	Robbie Sands	49	11.50	−51.71
Independent	Michael Yam	43	10.09	−4.34
Independent	Thomas Hudson	20	4.69	−1.81
Independent	Jacob Josiah	19	4.46	+4.46
Independent	Robert Holness	12	2.82	+2.82
Total formal votes		426	98.38	−1.22
Informal votes		7	1.62	+1.22
Turnout		433	56.75	−20.44
Two-candidate-preferred result
Independent	Territa Chey-Anne Dick	127	53.14	+53.14
Independent	Leslie Gilbert	112	46.86	+46.86
Independent gain from Independent		Swing	N/A	

=== Livingstone ===
2024 Queensland mayoral elections: Livingstone
Party	Candidate	Votes	%	±%
Independent	Adam Belot	7,550	31.04	+31.04
Independent	Andrew Ireland	7,070	29.07	−17.14
Independent	Grantley Douglas Jack	6,263	25.75	+25.75
Independent	Kelvin Appleton	3,437	14.13	+14.13
Total formal votes		24,320	96.32	−0.95
Informal votes		930	3.68	+0.95
Turnout		25,250	85.01	+4.27
Two-candidate-preferred result
Independent	Adam Belot	8,854	51.41	+51.41
Independent	Andrew Ireland	8,367	48.59	−4.90
Independent gain from Independent		Swing	N/A	

=== Lockhart River ===
2024 Queensland mayoral elections: Lockhart River
Party	Candidate	Votes	%	±%
Independent	Wayne William Butcher	134	56.54	+8.31
Independent	Rodney Daniel Accoom	103	43.46	+13.81
Total formal votes		237	98.75	+0.06
Informal votes		3	1.25	−0.06
Turnout		240	60.45	−0.29
Independent hold				

=== Lockyer Valley ===
2024 Queensland mayoral elections: Lockyer Valley
Party	Candidate	Votes	%	±%
Independent	Tanya Milligan	10,776	44.62	+44.62
Independent	Kyle Burnett	7,117	29.47	+29.47
Independent	Maree Rosier	6,258	25.91	+25.91
Total formal votes		24,151	94.83	+94.83
Informal votes		1,317	5.17	+5.17
Turnout		25,468	85.28	
Two-candidate-preferred result
Independent	Tanya Milligan	11,726	58.27	+58.27
Independent	Kyle Burnett	8,397	41.73	+41.73
Independent hold		Swing	N/A	

=== Logan ===
2024 Queensland mayoral elections: Logan
Party	Candidate	Votes	%	±%
Independent Labor	Jon Raven	92,858	55.58	+55.58
Independent	Brett Raguse	49,997	29.92	+11.01
Independent	James Reid	24,221	14.50	+14.50
Total formal votes		167,076	93.57	+1.73
Informal votes		11,486	6.43	−1.73
Turnout		178,562	78.60	+2.43
Two-candidate-preferred result
Independent Labor	Jon Raven	96,472	63.59	+63.59
Independent	Brett Raguse	55,229	36.41	+0.45
Independent Labor gain from Independent		Swing	N/A	

- Incumbent mayor Darren Power (Independent) did not recontest

=== Longreach ===
2024 Queensland mayoral elections: Longreach
Party	Candidate	Votes	%	±%
Independent	Tony Rayner	unopposed		
Independent hold		Swing	N/A	

=== Mackay ===
2024 Queensland mayoral elections: Mackay
Party	Candidate	Votes	%	±%
Team Greg Williamson	Greg Williamson	29,637	41.88	−58.12
Mackay First	Steve Jackson	27,368	38.68	+38.68
Independent	Laurence Bonaventura	13,756	19.44	+19.44
Turnout		73,111	82.28	
Two-candidate-preferred result
Team Greg Williamson	Greg Williamson	32,701	51.56	+51.56
Mackay First	Steve Jackson	30,722	48.44	+48.44
Team Greg Williamson hold		Swing	N/A	

=== Mapoon ===
2024 Queensland mayoral elections: Mapoon
Party	Candidate	Votes	%	±%
Independent	Ronaldo Guivarra	41	29.93	+29.93
Independent	Kiri Tabuai	39	28.47	+28.47
Independent	Cameron Hudson	34	24.82	+24.82
Independent	Daphne De Jersey	23	16.79	+16.79
Total formal votes		137	98.56	−0.72
Informal votes		2	1.44	+0.72
Turnout		139	58.16	−11.34
Two-candidate-preferred result
Independent	Ronaldo Guivarra	54	53.47	+53.47
Independent	Kiri Tabuai	47	46.53	+46.53
Independent gain from Independent		Swing	N/A	

=== Maranoa ===
2024 Queensland mayoral elections: Maranoa
Party	Candidate	Votes	%	±%
Independent	Wendy Taylor	3,529	47.59	+47.59
Independent	Tyson Golder	2,075	27.98	−39.09
Independent	Geoff McMullen	1,396	18.83	+18.83
Independent	David Schefe	415	5.60	−6.17
Total formal votes		7,415	98.84	−0.14
Informal votes		87	1.16	+0.14
Turnout		7,502	81.26	−0.54
Two-candidate-preferred result
Independent	Wendy Taylor	4,031	63.26	+63.26
Independent	Tyson Golder	2,341	36.74	−35.61
Independent gain from Independent		Swing	N/A	

=== Mareeba ===
2024 Queensland mayoral elections: Mareeba
Party	Candidate	Votes	%	±%
Independent	Angela Toppin	unopposed		
Independent hold		Swing	N/A	

=== McKinlay ===
2024 Queensland mayoral elections: McKinlay
Party	Candidate	Votes	%	±%
Independent	Janene Fegan	256	69.38	+69.38
Independent	Nyssa Currin	113	30.62	−7.33
Total formal votes		369	99.73	+0.44
Informal votes		1	0.27	−0.44
Turnout		370	72.41	−8.43
Independent gain from Independent				

=== Moreton Bay ===
2024 Queensland mayoral elections: Moreton Bay
Party	Candidate	Votes	%	±%
Independent	Peter Flannery	unopposed		
Independent hold		Swing	N/A	

=== Mornington ===
2024 Queensland mayoral elections: Mornington
Party	Candidate	Votes	%	±%
Independent	Richard Sewter	157	37.83	+4.01
Independent	Kyle Yanner	76	18.31	−33.41
Independent	Dwayne Rogers	67	16.14	+16.14
Independent	Joel Ah Kit	64	15.42	+15.42
Independent	Lyle Wilson	51	12.29	+12.29
Total formal votes		415	97.65	+2.99
Informal votes		10	2.35	−2.99
Turnout		425	58.78	−11.30
Two-candidate-preferred result
Independent	Richard Sewter	199	68.38	+28.33
Independent	Kyle Yanner	92	31.62	−28.33
Independent gain from Independent		Swing	+28.33	

=== Mount Isa ===
2024 Queensland mayoral elections: Mount Isa
Party	Candidate	Votes	%	±%
Team MacRae	Peta MacRae	2,493	33.89	+33.89
Community Team	Danielle Dee Slade	2,186	29.71	−14.42
Team Barwick	Phil Barwick	1,568	21.31	+21.31
Independent	David Fletcher	1,110	15.09	+1.39
Total formal votes		7,357	96.98	−0.79
Informal votes		229	3.02	+0.79
Turnout		7,586	63.66	−6.14
Two-candidate-preferred result
Team MacRae	Peta MacRae	2,917	54.24	+54.24
Community Team	Danielle Dee Slade	2,461	45.76	−6.49
Team MacRae gain from Community Team		Swing	N/A	

=== Murweh ===
2024 Queensland mayoral elections: Murweh
Party	Candidate	Votes	%	±%
Independent	Shaun Radnedge	unopposed		
Independent hold		Swing	N/A	

=== Napranum ===
2024 Queensland mayoral elections: Napranum
Party	Candidate	Votes	%	±%
Independent	Roy Chevathen	230	66.67	+20.94
Independent	Janita Gertrude Motton	115	33.33	−6.89
Total formal votes		345	98.57	+0.46
Informal votes		5	1.43	−0.46
Turnout		350	54.26	−11.34
Independent gain from Independent				

=== Noosa ===
2024 Queensland mayoral elections: Noosa
Party	Candidate	Votes	%	±%
Independent	Frank Wilkie	13,846	40.13	+40.13
Independent	Ingrid Jackson	8,074	23.40	+23.40
Independent	Nick Hluszko	7,245	21.00	+21.00
Independent	John Morrall	5,334	15.46	+15.46
Total formal votes		34,499	94.76	−2.14
Informal votes		1,909	5.24	+2.14
Turnout		36,408	82.51	+6.98
Two-candidate-preferred result
Independent	Frank Wilkie	15,364	56.83	+56.83
Independent	Ingrid Jackson	11,673	43.17	+43.17
Independent gain from Independent LNP		Swing	N/A	

- Incumbent mayor Clare Stewart (Independent LNP) did not recontest

=== North Burnett ===
2024 Queensland mayoral elections: North Burnett
Party	Candidate	Votes	%	±%
Independent	Les Hotz	2,342	38.14	+38.14
Independent LNP	Robbie Radel	2,010	32.73	+32.73
Independent	Peter Huth	1,789	29.13	+29.13
Total formal votes		6,141	98.87	+98.87
Informal votes		70	1.13	+1.13
Turnout		6,211	81.62	
Two-candidate-preferred result
Independent	Les Hotz	2,603	53.37	+53.37
Independent LNP	Robbie Radel	2,274	46.63	+46.63
Independent gain from Independent		Swing	N/A	

=== Northern Peninsula Area ===
2024 Queensland mayoral elections: Northern Peninsula Area
Party	Candidate	Votes	%	±%
Independent	Robert Poipoi	397	37.56	+37.56
Independent	Patricia Yusia	284	26.87	−3.54
Independent	Cassandra Sabatino	165	15.61	+15.61
Independent	Dale Salee	153	14.47	+14.47
Independent	Michael Solomon	58	5.49	+5.49
Total formal votes		1,057	98.69	−0.83
Informal votes		14	1.31	+0.83
Turnout		1,071	68.00	−4.10
Two-candidate-preferred result
Independent	Robert Poipoi	489	59.71	+59.71
Independent	Patricia Yusia	330	40.29	−12.97
Independent gain from Independent		Swing	N/A	

=== Palm Island ===
2024 Queensland mayoral elections: Palm Island
Party	Candidate	Votes	%	±%
Independent	Alf Lacey	304	41.64	+41.64
Independent	Lex Wotton	293	40.14	+18.72
Independent	Obadiah Geia	133	18.22	+5.40
Total formal votes		730	99.18	+0.37
Informal votes		6	0.82	−0.37
Turnout		736	57.95	−16.85
Two-candidate-preferred result
Independent	Alf Lacey	323	51.35	+51.35
Independent	Lex Wotton	306	48.65	+4.26
Independent gain from Independent		Swing	N/A	

=== Paroo ===
2024 Queensland mayoral elections: Paroo
Party	Candidate	Votes	%	±%
Independent	Suzette Catherine Beresford	245	28.06	−10.56
Independent	Perry Higgins	218	24.97	+24.97
Independent	William Carr	213	24.40	−13.37
Independent	Ethan Crumblin	197	22.57	+22.57
Total formal votes		873	99.09	−0.31
Informal votes		8	0.91	+0.31
Turnout		881	74.16	−1.04
Two-candidate-preferred result
Independent	Suzette Catherine Beresford	280	53.33	+2.16
Independent	William Carr	245	46.67	−2.16
Independent hold		Swing	+2.16	

=== Pormpuraaw ===
2024 Queensland mayoral elections: Pormpuraaw
Party	Candidate	Votes	%	±%
Independent	Ralph Kendall	122	37.54	+5.93
Independent	Ronald Kingi	104	32.00	+32.00
Independent	Vanessa Deakin	60	18.46	−5.25
Independent	Stephen Ambrum	39	12.00	+12.00
Total formal votes		325	98.48	+0.35
Informal votes		5	1.52	−0.35
Turnout		330	69.62	−12.94
Two-candidate-preferred result
Independent	Ralph Kendall	128	52.89	+8.01
Independent	Ronald Kingi	114	47.11	+47.11
Independent gain from Independent		Swing	N/A	

=== Quilpie ===
2024 Queensland mayoral elections: Quilpie
Party	Candidate	Votes	%	±%
Independent	Benjamin Hall	310	63.14	+63.14
Independent	Dick Loveday	181	36.86	+36.86
Total formal votes		491	98.99	+98.99
Informal votes		5	1.01	+1.01
Turnout		496	83.08	
Independent gain from Independent LNP				

=== Redland ===
2024 Queensland mayoral elections: Redland
Party	Candidate	Votes	%	±%
Leading Change	Jos Mitchell	52,599	52.20	+52.20
Independent	Andrew Laming	25,966	25.77	+25.77
Independent	Cindy Corrie	22,191	22.02	+22.02
Total formal votes		100,756	96.36	+0.70
Informal votes		3,808	3.64	−0.70
Turnout		104,564	86.98	+5.60
Two-candidate-preferred result
Leading Change	Jos Mitchell	60,280	67.67	+67.67
Independent	Andrew Laming	28,803	32.33	+32.33
Leading Change gain from Independent LNP		Swing	N/A	

- Incumbent mayor Karen Williams (Independent, later Independent LNP) did not recontest

=== Richmond ===
2024 Queensland mayoral elections: Richmond
Party	Candidate	Votes	%	±%
Independent	John Wharton	unopposed		
Independent hold		Swing	N/A	

=== Rockhampton ===
2024 Queensland mayoral elections: Rockhampton
Party	Candidate	Votes	%	±%
Independent Labor	Tony Williams	31,290	67.55	+42.73
Independent	Brett Williams	15,033	32.45	+31.94
Total formal votes		46,323	94.65	−2.79
Informal votes		2,616	5.35	+2.79
Turnout		48,939	82.66	+4.36
Independent Labor hold				

=== Scenic Rim ===
2024 Queensland mayoral elections: Scenic Rim
Party	Candidate	Votes	%	±%
Independent	Tom Sharp	12,572	46.78	+22.07
Independent	Jeffrey McConnell	9,571	35.62	+35.62
Independent	Greg Christensen	4,730	17.60	−15.38
Total formal votes		26,873	96.21	+0.56
Informal votes		1,060	3.79	−0.56
Turnout		27,933	84.36	+3.39
Two-candidate-preferred result
Independent	Tom Sharp	13,512	56.51	+8.53
Independent	Jeffrey McConnell	10,398	43.49	+43.49
Independent gain from Independent		Swing	N/A	

=== Somerset ===
2024 Queensland mayoral elections: Somerset
Party	Candidate	Votes	%	±%
Independent	Jason Wendt	9,683	61.05	+61.05
Independent LNP	Sean Choat	6,179	38.95	+38.95
Total formal votes		15,862	96.12	+96.12
Informal votes		641	3.88	+3.88
Turnout		16,503	85.35	
Independent gain from Independent				

=== South Burnett ===
2024 Queensland mayoral elections: South Burnett
Party	Candidate	Votes	%	±%
Independent LNP	Kathy Duff	9,030	41.95	+41.95
Independent	Kirstie Schumacher	5,263	24.45	+24.45
Independent	Gavin Jones	4,694	21.81	+21.81
Independent LNP	Tom Wilson	2,540	11.80	+11.80
Total formal votes		21,527	97.67	+0.49
Informal votes		513	2.33	−0.49
Turnout		22,040	85.60	+2.00
Two-candidate-preferred result
Independent LNP	Kathy Duff	10,077	60.41	+60.41
Independent	Kirstie Schumacher	6,604	39.59	+39.59
Independent LNP gain from Independent		Swing	N/A	

=== Southern Downs ===
2024 Queensland mayoral elections: Southern Downs
Party	Candidate	Votes	%	±%
Independent	Melissa Hamilton	10,995	46.51	+46.51
Independent LNP	Vic Pennisi	8,773	37.11	−7.08
Independent	Lindsay Goodwin	3,872	16.38	+16.38
Total formal votes		23,640	96.49	−1.14
Informal votes		861	3.51	+1.14
Turnout		24,501	86.50	+1.64
Two-candidate-preferred result
Independent	Melissa Hamilton	11,779	56.27	+56.27
Independent LNP	Vic Pennisi	9,154	43.73	−12.12
Independent gain from Independent LNP				

=== Sunshine Coast ===
2024 Queensland mayoral elections: Sunshine Coast
Party	Candidate	Votes	%	±%
Independent	Rosanna Natoli	56,849	27.46	+27.46
Independent	Ashley Robinson	50,532	24.41	+24.41
Independent	Jason O'Pray	44,338	21.42	+21.42
Independent	Min Swan	33,891	16.37	+16.37
Independent	Wayne Parcell	13,314	6.43	+6.43
Independent	Michael Burgess	8,067	3.90	−6.37
Total formal votes		206,991	95.24	+2.58
Informal votes		10,337	4.76	−2.58
Turnout		217,328	83.16	+8.10
Two-candidate-preferred result
Independent	Rosanna Natoli	71,408	53.53	+53.53
Independent	Ashley Robinson	61,984	46.47	+46.47
Independent gain from Independent		Swing	N/A	

=== Tablelands ===
2024 Queensland mayoral elections: Tablelands
Party	Candidate	Votes	%	±%
Independent	Rod Marti	8,153	52.89	+4.90
Independent	David Clifton	7,263	47.11	+47.11
Total formal votes		15,416	95.20	−1.19
Informal votes		777	4.80	+1.19
Turnout		16,193	80.64	+2.66
Independent hold				

=== Toowoomba ===
2024 Queensland mayoral elections: Toowoomba
Party	Candidate	Votes	%	±%
Independent	Geoff McDonald	85,176	82.51	+82.51
Independent	Douglas Doelle	18,056	17.49	+9.41
Total formal votes		103,232	94.91	−1.18
Informal votes		5,535	5.09	+1.18
Turnout		108,767	85.97	+3.92
Geoff McDonald hold				

=== Torres ===
2024 Queensland mayoral elections: Torres
Party	Candidate	Votes	%	±%
Independent	Elsie Seriat	876	63.34	+63.34
Independent	Yen N. Loban	507	36.66	+0.82
Total formal votes		1,383	99.28	+0.87
Informal votes		10	0.72	−0.87
Turnout		1,393	68.25	−2.48
Independent gain from Independent				

=== Torres Strait Island ===
2024 Queensland mayoral elections: Torres Strait Island
Party	Candidate	Votes	%	±%
Independent	Phillemon Sereako Mosby	797	39.99	−10.01
Independent	John Toshie Kris	641	32.16	+11.44
Independent	Regina Turner	206	10.34	+10.34
Independent	Mario Sabatino	184	9.23	+9.23
Independent	Jerry Dixie Stephen	165	8.28	+8.28
Total formal votes		1,993	99.60	+0.19
Informal votes		8	0.40	−0.19
Turnout		2,001	73.70	−7.60
Two-candidate-preferred result
Independent	Phillemon Sereako Mosby	851	54.94	−8.97
Independent	John Toshie Kris	698	45.06	+45.06
Independent hold		Swing	N/A	

=== Townsville ===
2024 Queensland mayoral elections: Townsville
Party	Candidate	Votes	%	±%
Independent	Troy Thompson	50,167	46.60	+46.60
Team Jenny Hill	Jenny Hill	47,415	43.86	−6.78
Independent	Harry Patel	10,529	9.74	+9.74
Total formal votes		108,111	96.51	
Informal votes		3,909	3.49	
Turnout		112,020	79.21	+4.94
Two-candidate-preferred result
Independent	Troy Thompson	53,956	52.62	+52.62
Team Jenny Hill	Jenny Hill	48,575	47.38	−14.15
Independent gain from Team Jenny Hill		Swing	N/A	

=== Western Downs ===
2024 Queensland mayoral elections: Western Downs
Party	Candidate	Votes	%	±%
Independent	Andrew Smith	13,687	76.07	+76.07
Independent	Glenn Strandquist	4,306	23.93	−2.61
Total formal votes		17,993	98.13	−0.39
Informal votes		342	1.87	+0.39
Turnout		18,335	75.10	−0.81
Independent gain from Independent				

=== Whitsunday ===
2024 Queensland mayoral elections: Whitsunday
Party	Candidate	Votes	%	±%
Independent	Ry Collins	8,851	47.22	+47.22
Independent	Philip Batty	4,672	24.92	+24.92
Independent	Peter Hood	2,822	15.05	+15.05
Independent	Richard Evans	2,401	12.81	+12.81
Total formal votes		18,746	94.06	+94.06
Informal votes		1,184	5.94	+5.94
Turnout		19,930	81.27	
Two-candidate-preferred result
Independent	Ry Collins	9,478	62.60	+62.60
Independent	Philip Batty	5,663	37.40	+37.40
Independent gain from Independent One Nation		Swing	N/A	

=== Winton ===
2024 Queensland mayoral elections: Winton
Party	Candidate	Votes	%	±%
Independent	Cathy White	403	52.89	+52.89
Independent	Gavin Baskett	359	47.11	−16.24
Total formal votes		762	100.00	+0.28
Informal votes		0	0.00	−0.28
Turnout		762	87.19	−1.77
Independent gain from Independent				

=== Woorabinda ===
2024 Queensland mayoral elections: Woorabinda
Party	Candidate	Votes	%	±%
Independent	Terence Munns	151	43.02	+43.02
Independent	Nikki Britcher	79	22.51	+22.51
Independent	Kylie Major	77	21.94	+8.70
Independent	Laurita Hill	44	12.54	+12.54
Total formal votes		351	100.00	+1.45
Informal votes		0	0.00	−1.45
Turnout		351	63.59	−20.81
Two-candidate-preferred result
Independent	Terence Munns	155	65.96	+65.96
Independent	Nikki Britcher	80	34.04	+34.04
Independent gain from Independent		Swing	N/A	

=== Wujal Wujal ===
2024 Queensland mayoral elections: Wujal Wujal
Party	Candidate	Votes	%	±%
Independent	Alister Gibson	96	69.06	+69.06
Independent	Bradley Creek	43	30.94	−21.93
Total formal votes		139	97.89	−0.23
Informal votes		3	2.11	+0.23
Turnout		142	64.25	−12.67
Independent gain from Independent				

=== Yarrabah ===
2024 Queensland mayoral elections: Yarrabah
Party	Candidate	Votes	%	±%
Independent	Daryl Sexton	416	41.23	+41.23
Independent	Ross James Andrews	311	30.82	−1.00
Independent	Percy Neal	282	27.95	+8.86
Total formal votes		1,009	98.44	−0.77
Informal votes		16	1.56	+0.77
Turnout		1,025	61.67	−12.93
Two-candidate-preferred result
Independent	Daryl Sexton	526	61.81	+61.81
Independent	Ross James Andrews	325	38.19	−18.05
Daryl Sexton gain from Ross James Andrews				
