= Cherbourg (disambiguation) =

Cherbourg is an ancient town in France. Cherbourg may also refer to:

- Cherbourg-en-Cotentin, a commune and city, formed in 2016, in the French department Manche
- Cherbourg Harbour
- Cherbourg Naval Base
- Cherbourg-Octeville, a former French commune, formed in 2000 and merged into Cherbourg-en-Cotentin in 2016
- Cherbourg peninsula
- Cherbourg, Queensland, Australia, a town
- Aboriginal Shire of Cherbourg, Queensland, Australia

== See also ==
- Cherbourg – Maupertus Airport
- Battle of Cherbourg (June 1944)
- Raid on Cherbourg (1758)
- The Umbrellas of Cherbourg, a French film directed by Jacques Demy (1964)
