= 2013 Queensland local elections =

Australian local elections

- 9 November 2013

The 2013 Queensland local elections were held on 9 November 2013 to elect the mayors and councils of four local government areas in Queensland, Australia.

Elections were held for the shires of Douglas, Livingstone, Mareeba and Noosa following successful votes to de-amalgamate from the regions of Cairns, Rockhampton, Tablelands and Sunshine Coast respectively. The demergers officially came into effect on 1 January 2014.

== Background ==
=== 2008 amalgamations ===
In April 2007, an extensive local government reform process was set up by the Beattie Government, who set up a Local Government Reform Commission to report on the State's local government areas (other than the City of Brisbane). This was in part due to the number of financially weak councils with small populations in rural areas, dating from an earlier time when industry and population had justified their creation. The Commission reported back on 27 July 2007, recommending massive amalgamations all over the State into "regional councils" centred on major towns or centres, based on a range of criteria such as economy of scale, community of interest and financial sustainability.

On 10 August 2007, the commission's amalgamation recommendations passed into law as the Local Government (Reform Implementation) Act 2007, with only a few name changes as alterations. "Local Transition Committees" (LTCs) were created for each new area, made up of councillors and staff from the original areas, with the old entities formally ceasing to exist on the day of the 2008 local elections.

=== 2012 de-amalgamation push ===
During the 2012 Queensland state election campaign, the Liberal National Party promised to reconsider the amalgamations. Having won government on 24 March 2012, they invited former shires wishing to de-amalgamate to make submissions which:

- demonstrated that it was financially viable to de-amalgamate
- accepted that the re-established shire would bear the full costs of de-amalgamation
- was supported by the signatures of at least 20% of the voters in the former shires.

Viable proposals would then be put to a referendum in the former shire for a majority vote on de-amalgamation. Submissions were received from 19 communities, but only four submissions were found to be viable: Douglas, Livingstone, Mareeba and Noosa.

=== March 2013 de-amalgamation polls ===
On 9 March 2013, polls were held in the four affected former shires, asking residents if they wanted to de-amalgamate. Voting was compulsory.

The wording of the question for each region was: "Should a [former LGA] Shire Council be created by the de-amalgamation of the [current LGA] Regional Council local government area, with the costs to be met by the [former LGA] Shire Council?"

The "Yes" vote won in all councils, with the highest vote in Noosa, where more than 80% of residents voted to split from Sunshine Coast.

LGA	YES		NO		Informal		Turnout	
LGA	Votes	%	Votes	%	Votes	%	Total	%
Douglas	3,230	57.64	2,374	42.36	51	0.90	5,655	81.98
Livingstone	10,862	56.59	8,331	43.41	195	1.01	19,388	87.57
Mareeba	6,165	57.90	4,482	42.10	101	0.94	10,748	87.19
Noosa	24,477	81.38	5,602	18.62	270	0.89	30,349	87.16
