= Aboriginal Shire of Cherbourg =

- Local government area
- Interactive map of Aboriginal Shire of Cherbourg
- Coordinates: 26.2920°S 151.9543°E
- Country: Australia
- State: Queensland
- Region: Wide Bay-Burnett
- Council seat: Cherbourg

Government
  - Mayor: Elvie Jean Sandow Jnr
  - State electorate: Nanango
  - Federal division: Wide Bay

Area
  - Total: 31.6 km^{2} (12.2 sq mi)

Population
  - Total: 1,194 (2021 census)
  - Density: 37.78/km^{2} (97.86/sq mi)
- Website: Aboriginal Shire of Cherbourg
LGAs around Aboriginal Shire of Cherbourg
South Burnett	South Burnett	South Burnett
South Burnett	Cherbourg	South Burnett
South Burnett	South Burnett	South Burnett

The Aboriginal Shire of Cherbourg is a local government area in Wide Bay–Burnett, Australia.

In the 2021 census, the Aboriginal Shire of Cherbourg had a population of 1,194 people.

== Geography ==
The Aboriginal Shire of Cherbourg is completely surrounded by the South Burnett Region. The shire includes the town of Cherbourg.

== History ==
The name Cherbourg derives from the parish name, which takes its name the original 1840s pastoral run name, which is believed to be a corruption of Chirbury, a town in Shropshire, England, the birthplace of pastoralist Richard Jones who leased the pastoral run in the 1850s.

== Demographics ==
In 2006 census, the shire had a population of around 1,241 people, making it Queensland's third largest Aboriginal community. The town is located on traditional lands that belong to the 'Wakka Wakka' (Waka Waka), people, but many different clan groups are also represented, including 'Gubbi Gubbi' (Kabi Kabi) people. A sign on entry to the town reads "Many Tribes, One Community". In 2006, median individual income for residents of Cherbourg was $227 per week, less than half the national median. 98.8% of housing in the town is stand-alone houses. The community participates in Work for the Dole scheme. Unemployment in the town is high as there is very little genuine work to be found in the town or in nearby Murgon. Results from 2006 census survey reported 31.4% of the workforce was employed full-time while 49.5% worked part-time and 5.8% were unemployed.

In the 2016 census, the Aboriginal Shire of Cherbourg had a population of 1,269 people.

In the 2021 census, the Aboriginal Shire of Cherbourg had a population of 1,194 people.

== Mayors ==
- 2020–present: Elvie Jean Sandow Jnr

== Election results ==
=== 2024 ===
2024 Queensland local elections: Cherbourg
Party	Candidate	Votes	%	±%
Independent	Carla Fisher (elected)	169	11.42	
Independent	Thomas Langton (elected)	164	11.08	
Independent	Daniel Weazel (elected)	160	10.81	
Independent	Gordon Wragge (elected)	145	9.80	
Independent	Luella Watson	142	9.59	
Independent	Errol Simpson	139	9.39	
Independent	James Dodd Saltner	123	8.31	
Independent	Fred Cobbo	104	7.03	
Independent	Leighton Costello	92	6.22	
Independent	Bronwyn Murray	88	5.95	
Independent	Elgan Saunders	88	5.95	
Independent	Cindy Button	66	4.46	
Turnout		379	50.00	
