= Greg Williamson (politician) =

Australian politician

Councillor Greg Williamson

Mayor of Mackay
- Incumbent
- Assumed office 13 March 2016
- Preceded by: Dierdre Comerford

Personal details
- Party: Independent
- Spouse: Annette Williamson
- Children: Dean Williamson; Leigh Williamson
- Occupation: Pilot; Businessman

Gregory Roy Williamson is the mayor of North Queensland's Mackay Regional Council, a position he has held since 2016.

Before entering politics, Williamson was a radio announcer for Mackay's local 4MK radio station. He was the CQ Manager for Bush Pilot Airways in the early 19802s and then operated his own Travel Business "Greg Williamson's Travel Shop" for 11 years. Williamson started his political career as an alderman of what was then the Mackay City Council in the 1980s. He oversaw the amalgamation of the city and shire councils in 1994.

Williamson first served as Mackay's mayor from 1991 to 1994 before going into business and then returning to public office in 2016. Williamson is a fifth generation Mackay local and has over 35 years of service with the Australian Air Force Cadets.

In October 2019, The New York Times profiled Williamson's planting, outreach, and education efforts to protect his community from the negative effects of climate change as part of a growing trend of small-town mayors hoping to affect change at the local level.

Williamson formed the Greg Williamson Alliance ahead of the 2016 election, with six members of the group re-elected in 2020. In 2023, four councillors left the group, and in 2024 he formed Team Greg Williamson.

Williamson was re-elected at the 2024 local government elections with 51.56% of the vote after preferences.
