= Steve Jackson (rugby league) =

Australian rugby league footballer

Personal information
- Born: 22 October 1965 (age 61) Mackay, Queensland, Australia

Playing information
- Position: Prop
Club
Years	Team	Pld	T	G	FG	P
1987–89	Canberra Raiders	16	4	0	0	16
1990–91	Western Suburbs	38	5	0	0	20
1992–93	Gold Coast Seagulls	24	6	1	0	26
	Total	78	15	1	0	62
Representative
Years	Team	Pld	T	G	FG	P
1990–93	Queensland	9	1	0	0	4
- Source: As of 28 January 2019

Steve Jackson (born 22 October 1965) is an Australian former rugby league footballer. He played in the New South Wales Rugby League premiership for the Canberra Raiders, Western Suburbs Magpies and Gold Coast Seagulls.

== Playing career ==
Hailing from Mackay, Jackson began playing rugby league when he was 5. Jackson made his first grade debut with Magpies Mackay before joining the Raiders in 1987. He played three years with the Raiders, making only 16 appearances, almost entirely from the bench.

Jackson is best remembered for coming from the bench to score the "iconic" try in the 1989 Grand Final. Jackson carried opposition players across on the tryline to win the match in overtime. Won by the Canberra Raiders 19–14 over Balmain Tigers, it has been described as, "the greatest grand final of all time." In the post season he travelled with the Raiders to England for the 1989 World Club Challenge, playing at prop forward in the loss to Widnes. This was Jackson's last ever appearance for the Raiders, as he and teammate Ivan Henjak signed for the Magpies from 1990, Jackson quickly establishing himself in the starting team.

The same year Jackson made his debut for Queensland in the third match of the 1990 series, again scoring the winning try. He went on to play 9 State of Origin matches for Queensland. Joining the Gold Coast Seagulls for 2 seasons, he retired in 1993 due to back injury.

== Post playing ==
Since retiring Jackson has coached a number of teams in the Mackay area. The Mackay area Under-11s schoolboy challenge has been named in his honour.

Jackson led Jacko's Team - Mackay First team for Queensland local government elections in March 2024.
