= Cyclone Winifred =

Category 3 Australian region cyclone in 1986

Severe Tropical Cyclone Winifred
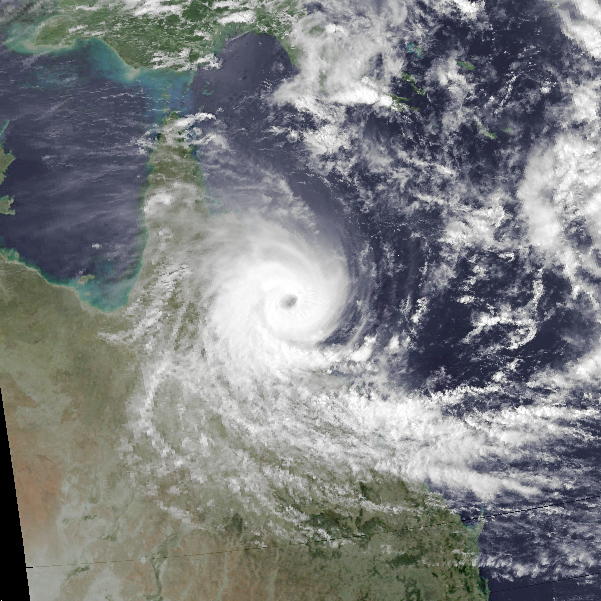
- Cyclone Winifred nearing Queensland on 1 February

Meteorological history
- Formed: 27 January 1986
- Dissipated: 5 February 1986

Category 3 severe tropical cyclone
- 10-minute sustained (BOM)
- Highest winds: 155 km/h (100 mph)
- Lowest pressure: 957 hPa (mbar); 28.26 inHg

Category 2-equivalent tropical cyclone
- 1-minute sustained (SSHWS/JTWC)
- Highest winds: 165 km/h (105 mph)
- Lowest pressure: 954 hPa (mbar); 28.17 inHg

Overall effects
- Fatalities: 3 direct
- Damage: $154 million (1986 USD)
- Areas affected: Queensland
- IBTrACS
- Part of the 1985–86 Australian region cyclone season

Severe Tropical Cyclone Winifred made landfall in northern Queensland, inflicting significant damage on the northeastern coast of Australia. The sixth named storm of the 1985–86 Australian region cyclone season, Winifred originated as a tropical low north of Cairns on 27 January 1986. Slowly organizing, the system was recognized as a tropical cyclone after gaining tropical characteristics on 30 January, christened with the name Winifred the same day. Meandering southward, the cyclone began to curve southeastward that evening before suddenly turning toward the coast, southwestward, on 31 January, steadily intensifying in that time. By the time it came ashore near Silkwood at 0445 UTC on 1 February, it was producing Category 3-force winds on the Australian tropical cyclone intensity scale and a minimum atmospheric pressure of 957 mbar (28.38 inHg). Weakening as it drifted inland, Winifred persisted as a tropical depression for another five days after landfall before finally dissipating on 5 February.

In advance of Winifred's approach, the Australian Bureau of Meteorology (BoM) issued cyclone watches and warnings for various locations along the Queensland coast, prompting evacuations in several towns. Damage after landfall was widespread and severe, with thousands of homes damaged, flooding as a result of heavy rainfall along major rivers, and severe damage to crops. Debris obstructed roads across northern Queensland and power outages disrupted electrical service, even at water treatment plants, forcing officials to warn residents to boil water as a precautionary measure. Overall, the cyclone caused $86.4 million in agriculture-related damages, with sugar cane and banana harvests suffering the most. Tourist operations were generally uninterrupted by the storm, while ecological and environmental damage, if any, was mild. Even so, high winds uprooted trees in wide swaths of forests, with those not completely defoliated. Overall, Winifred caused three deaths and inflicted $130 million (1986 AUD; $154 million USD) (Note: The damage total was originally reported in 1986 Australian dollars. Using the Reserve Bank of Australia, the total was inflated to $315 million in 2013 dollars. The total would be $327 million after converted to 2013 United States dollars using the Oanda Corporation, which would be about $154 million when adjusted for inflation to 1986.) in damage. (Note: All damage figures are in 1986 Australian dollars (AUD) unless otherwise noted.)

In the aftermath of the cyclone, the Federal Government distributed financial and emergency aid, offering to provide assistance to hard-hit banana and sugar cane farmers in northern Queensland. Hundreds of State Emergency Service volunteers were deployed to restore electrical and water services, evacuate local citizens, provide food, and repair and protect structures. The Department of Social Security sent employees to receive claims for damage, requests for financial aid, and filings for unemployment benefits. Meanwhile, the Commonwealth of Australia initiated a three-year, $150 million program to provide relief to damaged areas. Fund payments, however, were frequently incorrectly distributed, and in some cases, fraudulent. In the confusion in the days following the cyclone, looters stole possessions in areas within the vicinity of Innisfail, and relief efforts were impeded by thunderstorms at Cairns. The BoM was subject to heavy criticism in the days following the storm's landfall, accused of not giving ample warning in advance of Winifred's approach; however, these concerns were later addressed in its report on the cyclone's impact. Due to the severity of the storm's damage, the name Winifred was retired after the season ended.

== Meteorological history ==
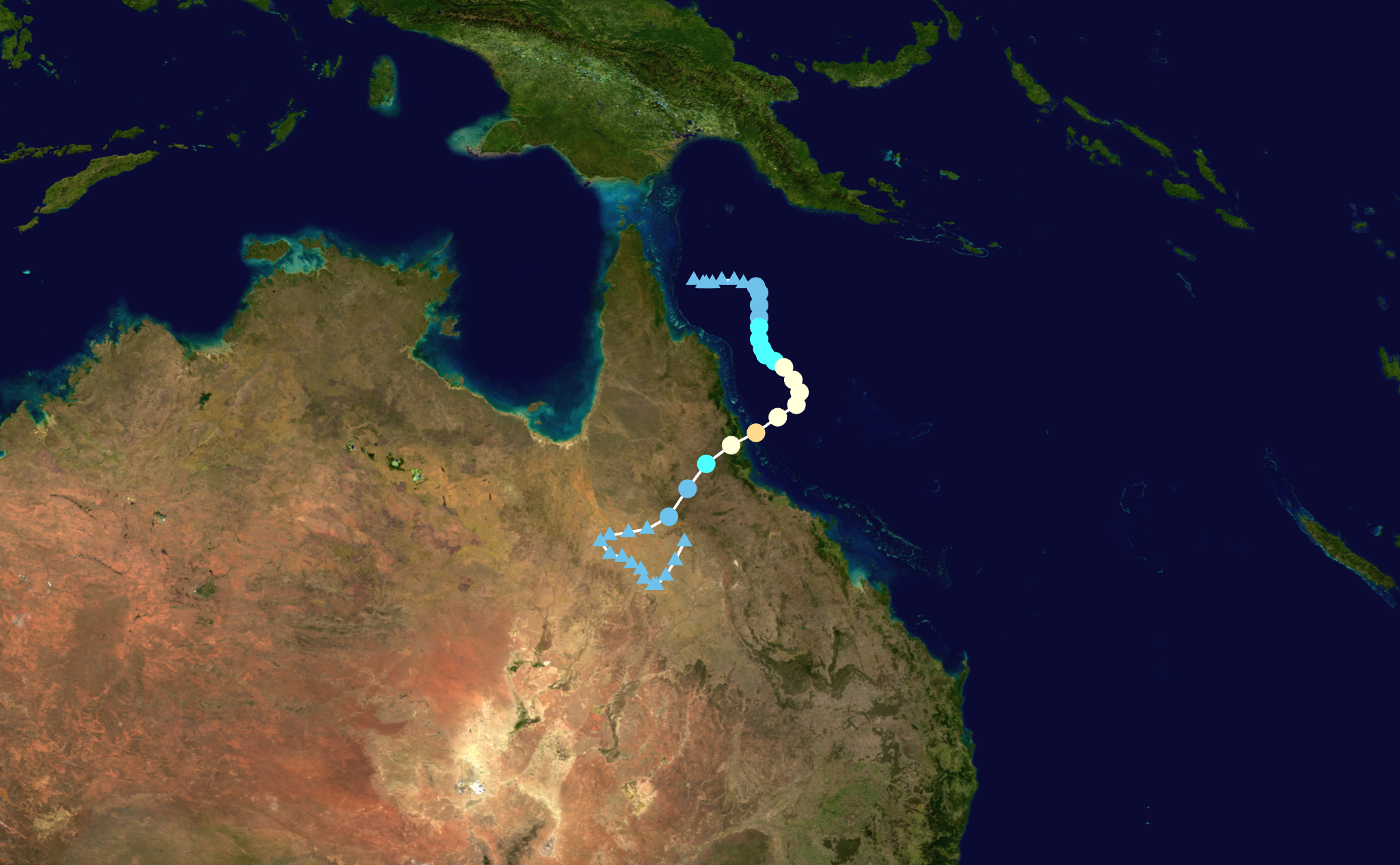
Map plotting the storm's track and intensity, according to the Saffir–Simpson scale Map key Saffir–Simpson scale Tropical depression (≤38 mph, ≤62 km/h) Tropical storm (39–73 mph, 63–118 km/h) Category 1 (74–95 mph, 119–153 km/h) Category 2 (96–110 mph, 154–177 km/h) Category 3 (111–129 mph, 178–208 km/h) Category 4 (130–156 mph, 209–251 km/h) Category 5 (≥157 mph, ≥252 km/h) Unknown Storm type Tropical cyclone Subtropical cyclone Extratropical cyclone, remnant low, tropical disturbance, or monsoon depression

The origins of Cyclone Winifred can be traced to a tropical low first noted approximately 450 mi (720 km) north of Cairns on 27 January 1986. The system initially drifted to the northwest, exhibiting characteristics indicating gradual organization. On the morning of 29 January, it curved southward while slowly strengthening. Observations gathered by the Geostationary Meteorological Satellite on 30 January evidenced that the low had developed into a tropical cyclone while maintaining a minimum atmospheric pressure of 995 mbar (29.38 inHg). As a result, the Bureau of Meteorology designated the disturbance the name Winifred at 1400 UTC as it meandered southward, the sixth named storm of the 1985–86 Australian region cyclone season. The cyclone continued to steadily intensify, attaining Category 1-equivalent intensity on the Saffir–Simpson hurricane wind scale during the morning of 1 February, with winds of 118 km/h (73 mph). Forecasting of Winifred's track was impeded by the presence of a canopy of persistent high-level cirrus clouds shielding the eye and rainbands of the cyclone throughout its course, leading to inaccuracies in locating the cyclone's centre through satellite observations.

Forecasts initially projected the cyclone recurving southeastward late on 30 January before tracing southwestward during the evening of 31 January. Maintaining a relatively large eye with a width of about 51 km (32 mi), the cyclone intensified while nearing the shoreline of northern Queensland; by 0300 UTC the following day, though, a slight reduction in its size was noticeable, and by the time the cyclone made landfall, its eye was merely 41 km (25 mi) in diameter. In conjunction, the storm's minimum atmospheric pressure sank to 957 mbar (28.3 inHg) by the time the cyclone made landfall near Silkwood at 0445 UTC, indicative of the storm's peak intensity; the low pressure, coinciding with 10-minute maximum sustained winds of 130 km/h (81 mph), placed Winifred as a Category 2-equivalent storm on the Saffir–Simpson scale, or a Category 3 severe tropical cyclone on the Australian scale. Drifting father inland, Winifred's radar features became distorted as it weakened; despite this, it lingered overland as a tropical depression for another five days before finally dissipating. Although official best track data recorded the storm dissipated on 5 February, Winifred was operationally declared dissipated on 6 February. The cyclone was the first in 14 years to significantly impact the northeastern coast of Australia.

== Preparations ==
Numerous warnings were issued throughout the course of the cyclone. The first cyclone watch related to Cyclone Winifred was declared by the Bureau of Meteorology on 29 January for various locations in Queensland, spanning from Thursday Island to Cooktown, and was adjusted as Winifred approached. The initial cyclone warning was issued on the morning of 30 January, stretching between Cape Flattery and Townsville, while the previous cyclone watch was expanded to cover areas from Lockhart River to St Lawrence. The warning was later extended to reach Cooktown and Bowen, and was further lengthened to span regions from Cairns to St Lawrence. On the morning of 1 February, observations indicated that the cyclone had suddenly veered toward the coast, and a Flash Tropical Cyclone Advice was subsequently released, noting the potential for powerful winds between Fitzroy Island and Innisfail. In conjunction, the Queensland Flood Warning Centre initiated flood warnings along the Tully, Herbert, Bulloo, Barcoo, Thomson, Diamantina and Cooper waterways. The BoM also imposed a gale warning stretching from Cooktown to Cardwell, accompanied a strong wind warning between Cape Melville and Gladstone.

Winifred forced many to flee from hotels in northern Queensland, and at Cairns, boats were ordered to be docked at harbor. State Emergency Service members and other individuals worked to evacuate dozens of people in Ingham, as well as along the Tully, Burdekin, and Herbert rivers. Inhabitants of caravan parks were forced to vacate their residences in Innisfail and helicopter crews cleared residents from Ingham and Babinda. Meanwhile, many at Minnamoolka along the banks of the Burdekin River left their homes as a cautionary measure. and 47 citizens of Mourilyan evacuated to a club lodge.

== Impact ==
Offshore impacts were significant; on 30 January, the yacht Darkie washed ashore at South Brook Island, its crew of four surviving. Throughout Queensland, the cyclone isolated small towns, cut off telephone service, inflicted severe damage to crops, and generated widespread flooding. Between Cairns and Ingham, Winifred obliterated structures, toppled power lines, uprooted trees, wrecked 1000 homes, and damaged hundreds of others. Service of The Sunlander between Gordonvale and Babinda was interrupted after tracks were inundated, and travelers were forced to travel by bus instead. At the latter city, approximately 500 homes suffered significant damage, and at Innisfail, 200 residences were destroyed. Several individuals were recovered safely from wreckage of a building collapse in each city. At Babinda, sixteen other structures were wrecked, with the cyclone unroofing an additional 50 houses and flattening 40 sheds. Five individuals were badly injured, two of them impaled by flying glass and other debris. Officials noted that the cyclone tore off the police station door and unroofed a Uniting Church. Helicopter reconnaissance indicated severe damage to sugarcane and banana crops as well as a critical electrical power tower, with considerable damage observed in the town proper.

At Innisfail, Winifred damaged 190 houses, downed electrical wires, overturned trees, and flooded lowlands, with reports of over 200 mm (7.9 in) in rainfall. Innisfail Hospital, meanwhile, suffered the loss of several windows, inciting the evacuation of patients to the first floor. The cyclone drove a small vessel ashore at nearby Banana Island; in addition, a teenage girl was severely impaled by a flying slab of iron in downtown Innisfail, later dying as a result of her injuries. Meanwhile, at Malanda, a man was knocked off a shed roof by a strong gust and was subsequently declared dead. Winds leveled dozens of structures at Mission Beach, Tully, Silkwood, Kurrimine Beach, Cardwell, El Arish, South Johnstone, and Mourilyan. At Mourilyan, 12 boats sank in the town harbor, and all structures were damaged to some extent, with 20 houses roofless and one flattened. At Tully, the capacity of the Kareeya Hydro Power Station was slightly reduced after rubbish became stuck in its components, and at Ingham, the Herbert River peaked at a height of 15.8 m (52 ft), overflowing its barriers by 10 m (33 ft). Cyclone Winifred inundated the main street of Ingham with flood waters, completely obstructed numerous north-to-south streets, flooded stores, and cut off electricity from Avergowie College. A 35-year-old man was discovered dead down a storm water drain, having drowned in the storm's flood waters. Debris and flooding also impeded and obstructed of parts of the Bruce, Gillies, and Palmerston highways.

Rescue and relief work was impeded by overloaded telephone communications, and consequentially, Telecom ceased telephone service between Townsville and Ingham. Nearly 400 mm (16 in) of rainfall was measured at Cardstone along the Tully River, and flooding was noted along the boundaries of both the Tully and Herbert rivers, of which the prior had receded from its peak level to 9.09 m (29.8 ft) by the afternoon of 3 February. The city of Cairns and its outskirts experienced power outages, and high tides nearby compelled ship owners to seek refuge at ports. Blackouts rendered chlorination facilities and water treatment plants useless, and residents were subsequently advised to boil water. Damage to three roofs was reported at Bingal Beach north of Cairns, and in Cairns proper, damaged ten houses, with five of them unroofed, toppled trees, and knocked down power lines. The storm delivered similarly severe damage along Marlin Beach within the vicinity of Cairns, washing away stretches of its coastline, unroofing two residences, damaging 13 other structures, and overturning power lines. The loss of electricity at one building in the Cairns Base Hospital complex, which was also unroofed, left it running on emergency power.

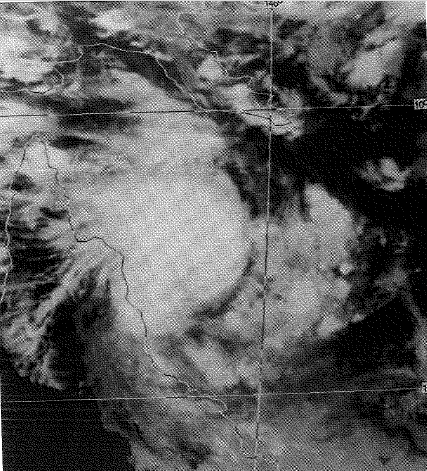
Winifred approaching the coast of northern Queensland

One person was struck and injured by an uprooted tree at Atherton, which suffered the loss of one house. All residences in Cardwell endured some degree of damage, with six unroofed, and the town itself was without power. Roads in Charters Towers were obstructed, and minor damage was observed at Cowley Beach, Dunk Island, and East Russell. Nearly all buildings in El Arish were damaged, and at Gordonvale, flooding inflicted widespread crop damage and winds toppled trees and power lines. Flood waters cut off the town of Halifax and inundated local businesses. Although no structural damage was recorded in Herberton, the cyclone uprooted trees, crippled Archer Bridge above Kennedy Creek, and halted electrical and telephone service. Mena Creek was completely cut off, and at Malanda, 30 homes experienced damage and 20 farms were wrecked. At Millaa Millaa, the cyclone damaged 12 dwellings, and hundreds of barns, also impeding access to power and water supplies. Meanwhile, at Miriwinni, winds damaged 50 houses, toppled electrical wires, and strewed roads with debris. Despite the fact that flooding was less serious at Kurrimine Beach, the storm still damaged dozens of houses and toppled electrical poles, with the towns of Ravenshoe and Silkwood experiencing power outages following the disturbance's passage. Although only inconsequential residential damage occurred at Woopen Creek and Yungaburra, damage at Tully was more serious, with considerable flooding, destruction to six houses, damage to a police station, and a localized blackout.

The cyclone caused $50 million in damage to the banana crop and $3 million to papaws between Ingham to Cairns alone. Agricultural impairment was not limited to Babinda; throughout northern Queensland, the storm devastated banana and papaw crops. Avocado farms at Atherton and pineapple farms in Rollingstone and Mutarnee experienced considerable losses; in addition, $35 million in sugar cane crops near Innisfail were destroyed, with 60–70 percent of the entire year's harvest ruined. Within the vicinity of Tully, the storm ruined 30 percent of the crop, causing $10 million in losses. In general, the sugar industry, already economically weak, bore the brunt of the system's impact. Overall, Winifred caused $86.4 million in agricultural losses; the cyclone ruined 1.5 million tonnes of sugar, costing $40 million, 3.7 million cases of bananas, costing $34.6 million, and 15 percent of the maize crop, costing $500,000. Winifred also damaged $4.9 million in papaws, and $3.8 million in avocados, lychees, custard apples, flowers, and chokos, as well. Effects to dairy and poultry industries were less severe, with losses reported at $2 million and $600,000, respectively. Winds uprooted large swaths of forest, with $1 million in damage at government-owned forests alone.

Ecological damage was widespread but generally mild. Although damage to mangroves was minor, the cyclone defoliated swaths of many coastal and island forests. For the most part, cays and reefs were unharmed, with no visible change in the general appearance or shape of reefs and little underwater change as well. It was noted, however, that water clarity surrounding certain reefs was poor. River plumes of the Herbert, Tully, Murray, Hull, Johnstone, and Mulgrave/Russell rivers were noticeably changed, with some paths diverted. The Herbert River plume expanded to encompass areas near the Greater Palm group of islands, the Mulgrave/Russell around the Frankland Islands. In addition, the loss of a raft system utilized for farming of giant clams was noted near Fitzroy Island. Tourist operations experienced little damage from Winifred, with only minimal damage on Dunk Island, Bedarra Island, and Mission Beach. Overall, Winifred caused three deaths and $130 million (1986 AUD) in damage, and was described by the Bureau of Meteorology as the worst cyclone to strike Queensland since Cyclone Althea in 1971.

== Aftermath ==
On 3 February, the head of the State Emergency Service and Premier Joh Bjelke-Petersen toured northern Queensland to inspect damage. The Federal Government vowed to assist by providing financial and emergency services, also offering to provide aid to banana and sugar cane farmers who suffered losses as a result of Winifred. Two government helicopters were sent shortly thereafter, assessing the severity of damage, evacuating residents, and delivering food. Bjelke-Petersen later expressed anger at the federal government for having increased the threshold for disaster relief before raising loans, and also stated that the Federal Minister for Primary Industry, John Kerin, had no right to accompany him on his visit to northern Queensland, only offering to discuss an offer provided that the federal government was willing to provide financial assistance. Approximately 500 volunteers for the SES were deployed the same day, reinstating electrical and other essential services, evacuating regional citizens, delivering bread to numerous towns, and sending 700 tarpaulins to shield roofless houses. Rescue and relief work was hindered by high traffic on telephone networks, forcing Telecom to cease calls between Townsville and Ingham.

Emergency crews of the government's Department of Social Security visited locations throughout the region, receiving damage claims, requests for monetary aid, and filings for unemployment benefits. The Commonwealth pledged to provide $150 million in relief over a three-year period to the Government of Queensland in exchange for deregulation; however, its offer was initially rejected. Planes flew claims adjusters and other officials to Innisfail, establishing an insurance emergency service in the city hall, while the Insurance Council of Queensland deployed its special emergency service employees for the first time. As a result of severe damage, a disaster declaration for northern regions was issued by Queensland Government on 4 February. The first $10 million in aid from the state government, paid by the federal government, was supplied the same day. Meanwhile, the SES continued its cleanup efforts, removing debris and repairing structures. Looters took advantage of confusion in the days following the cyclone, striking residences throughout Innisfail. By the end of the day, 2200 tarpaulins had been distributed; however, the previously smooth relief efforts were impeded by thunderstorms in Cairns.

The Bureau of Meteorology was subject to scrutiny in the aftermath of Winifred, and was criticized for its lack of advance warning. Advices and warnings were received by regional television and radio stations up to 15 minutes late following issuance. Winifred's sudden and unexpected turn was little-anticipated by BoM meteorologists, with employees unable to verify the cyclone's centre from the Cairns radar until only about 9:30 a.m. on 1 February, with radar error of up to 44 km (27 mi) observed. However, a Flash Tropical Cyclone Advice was immediately issued shortly thereafter, reaching media outlets near noon that day. Media outlets went suggested the creation of a new Tropical Cyclone Warning Centre (TCWC) in Townsville as a result, but the suggestion was dismissed, with a centre already established in Brisbane. A spokesman for the SES stated that no warning was given by the BoM at 9 a.m., with the storm's alarming approach; the Service had initially been anticipating the storm's recurvature out to sea, only to receive a flash warning hours later. Months after Winifred, a Commonwealth inquiry sought to investigate misuse of National Disaster Relief Scheme funds related to Winifred, with a $145,000 payment to a National Party official, Mike Behan, one of several abuses. Due to the severity of the storm's damage, the name Winifred was retired after the season ended.

== See also ==
- List of retired Australian cyclone names
- Cyclone Justin – Brought severe flooding to Queensland and Papua New Guinea
- Cyclone Joy – Caused considerable damage in Rockhampton, Queensland
