= Alley Family Graves =

Cemetery in Queensland

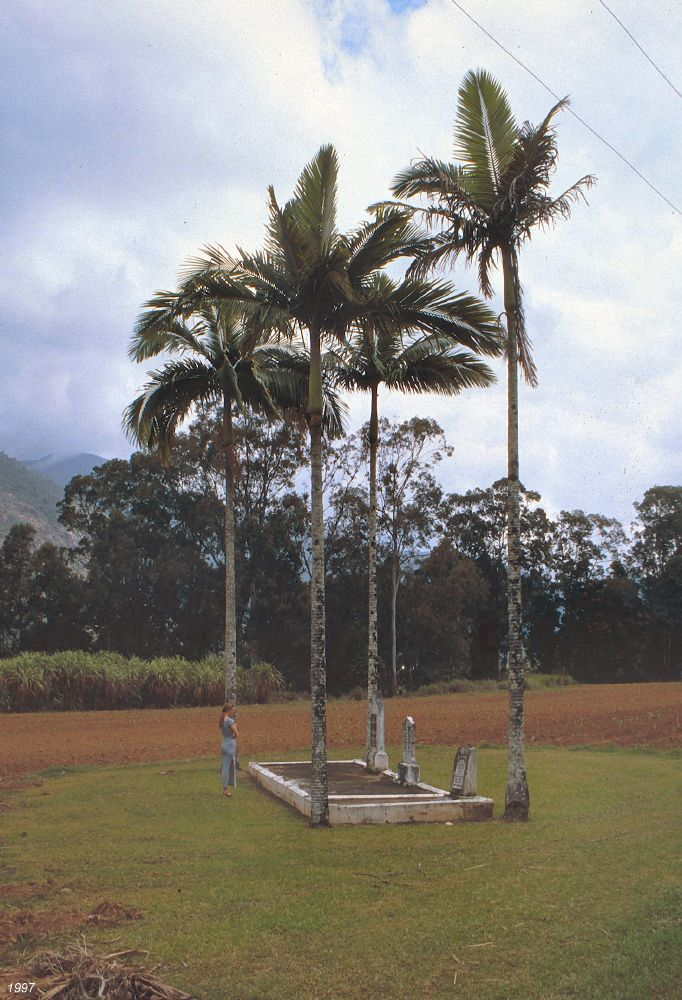
- Alley Family Graves, 1997

- Location within Queensland Location within Australia
- 17.1169°S 145.7738°E
- Location: Gillies Highway, Gordonvale, Cairns Region, Queensland, Australia

History
- Design period: 1870s–1890s (late 19th century)
- Built: 1887–1977

Queensland Heritage Register
- Official name: Alley Family Graves
- Type: state heritage (built)
- Designated: 23 August 1999
- Reference no.: 601141
- Significant period: 1887, 1889, 1929, 1930, 1943, 1977 (historical, fabric); 1887– (social)
- Significant components: headstone, burial/grave, plaque, grave surrounds/railings

Alley Family Graves is a heritage-listed cemetery at Gillies Highway, Gordonvale, Cairns Region, Queensland, Australia. It was built from 1887 to 1977. It was added to the Queensland Heritage Register on 23 August 1999.

== History ==
The Alley Family Graves sites contains the graves of William Saunders Alley and his wife Mary Alley, George Gorham Alley and his wife Mary Ellen Alley, Sarah Blackwell, and Willie (adopted infant son of Richard and Sarah Blackwell). There are also memorial plaques in memory of Richard Blackwell, James Healy and Bridget Hill (formerly Healy), and William Saunders Alley (b.1887 d. 1977). The site is located fronting the Gillies Highway, with sugar cane surrounding on three sides.

=== William Saunders Alley and Mary Alley (nee Banks) ===
WS Alley was born in London and grew up in Gosport. He was the son of a Commander in the British Merchant service, and at a young age went to sea and travelled extensively. Late in 1854 he became a member of the crew of the John Davies which sailed from Liverpool for Australia, arriving at Moreton Bay in May 1855. He left the ship at Brisbane and married Mary Banks, who had been a passenger on the John Davies. Mary was born at Logniddry, County Haddington, Scotland. They had three children, Sarah (who married Richard Blackwell), Mary (who married Tom Williams) and George Gorham (who married Mary Ellen Healy).

In Brisbane, WS Alley was the proprietor of several hotels. He was also the owner of punts which ran between Brisbane and Ipswich. He left Brisbane c.1877 for the Blackall Mine in the Banana district, and then to the Mount Perry goldfields. From there he proceeded to Cairns and settled at Cairns and Smithfield. He was involved in trading and timber-getting at Smithfield and ran a steam launch, the Countess, and a sailing ship from Cairns to Smithfield. He was also involved in timber-getting on the Barron River with his son-in-law Richard Blackwell and his son George Gorham in 1878. He was attracted by the stands of timber on the Mulgrave River, and with his family was the first to take a bullock team to the Mulgrave River (near where Gordonvale is today) in 1878. The journey to the Mulgrave took nearly three weeks, hacking a passage through swamp and scrub. On arrival at the Mulgrave they camped near where the Mulgrave Sugar Mill is located today.

The land from Cape Tribulation south was proclaimed open for selection on 1 March 1877 under the Crown Lands Alienation Act of 1876 which contained residential clauses. The first land was not taken up until March 1878. WS Alley, on 29 August 1879, took up the first land on the Mulgrave, which consisted of 640 acres (260 ha) and which he named Riverstone. The Alley Family Graves site is located on this land.

Initially he was involved in dairying and timber-getting. He erected the Riverstone Hotel in 1880, which was located on the pack track to Herberton. The Riverstone Hotel was described as:

"perhaps the nicest and best loved development in providing for the traveller was WS Alley's Riverstone Hotel the most welcome over night stopping place. Here WS Alley laid out extensive and tasteful tropical gardens and orchards, kept his own dairy and supplied his guests and Cairns with fresh butter. It became the social centre for the district, in demand for farewell gatherings, testimonial dinners and such happy occasions. Here were held dances to the thin sweet strains of the concertina played with the background of the tinkle of bells of packers mules and horses bringing down their ingots of tin. This was built before 1882 and burned down in 1907."

WS Alley reportedly erected the first dwelling, constructed the first bridge and road at his own expense, and grubbed (clearing of stumps), cleared and formed a road for about 7 miles (11 km) from Riverstone to Trinity Inlet. He was also a member of the Cairns Divisional Board and a Justice of the Peace.

According to their headstones, Mary Alley died in 1887 aged 50. WS Alley died on the 1 July 1889 aged 57. At the time of his death, the Cairns Post newspaper reported that he was buried by the side of his wife "in a pretty flower decked grave in the garden he loved so well".

=== Sarah Blackwell (nee Alley) and Richard Blackwell ===
Sarah married Richard Blackwell from Cornwall at the Blackall Mine in the Banana district. Richard Blackwell was originally motivated by the pursuit of gold. Before coming to Australia he had been at great Caribou rush in the Canadian wilds. In 1877–78 Richard Blackwell, with his wife and brother-in-law George Gorham Alley (aged 15–16), travelled overland in a dray from the Mt Perry goldfields to Brisbane. They then proceeded to Cooktown by ship, then to the Hodgkinson and Palmer Goldfields. They then travelled down the Kuranda Range and joined WS Alley in Smithfield where he was involved in trading and timber-getting. Sarah Blackwell was reportedly the first woman to ride down the Kuranda Range. Richard Blackwell was involved with WS Alley and George Gorham timber-getting on the Barron in 1878. They then accompanied WS Alley on the journey from Cairns to the Mulgrave River in 1878.

Richard Blackwell, on 18 October 1879, took up land in the Mulgrave area known as Plain Camp, near where Gordonvale is now located. He reportedly made a gift of part of this land for the establishment of the Mulgrave Mill. The Sugar Works Guarantee Act of 1893 provided for the erection of approved Central Mills on a government loan if farmers mortgaged their land as security. After the principal and interest had been met, these Central Mills were to be handed to the growers as Cooperative Mills. The Mulgrave settler's organisation evolved from a meeting held at Tom Mackey's farm, at which Richard Blackwell was in attendance. A provisional directorate was formed with Mackey as Chairman. The original memorandum of the Association of the Mulgrave Central Mill Co Ltd dated 14 November 1893, was registered in Brisbane 20 April 1895. Signatories to this included Richard Blackwell. The nominal capital of £40,000 was increased to £60,000 in 1896. The Mulgrave Central Mill enterprise proceeded rapidly, and Richard Blackwell was one of the first directors of the Mulgrave Mill. According to the plaque at Riverstone, he died in May 1920 and is buried in the Waverley Cemetery in Sydney.

According to her headstone at Riverstone, Sarah Blackwell died in April 1929 aged 71. Willie, the adopted infant son of Richard and Sarah Blackwell, is also buried at Riverstone aged 11 months.

=== George Gorham Alley and Mary Ellen Alley (nee Healy) ===
In 1877–78 at the age of 15–16, George Gorham accompanied his sister Sarah and brother-in-law Richard Blackwell who travelled overland in a dray from the Mount Perry goldfields to Brisbane. They then proceeded to Cooktown by ship, then to the Hodgkinson and Palmer Goldfields. They then travelled down the Kuranda Range and joined WS Alley in Smithfield where he was trading. George Gorham took a post in a store until 1878 when he joined Richard Blackwell and his father WS Alley timber-getting on the Barron. He accompanied the family on their journey from Cairns to Mulgrave in 1878. WS Alley selected land on the Mulgrave in 1879, but George stayed for a time on his own account rafting timber.

George felled timber for Burns Philp and other syndicates c.1883, and is described as a "scrub pioneer of Tableland cedar" . The logs were to be put in adjacent creeks or the main river. The payment was at the rate of five shillings per 100 superfeet on logs when placed in a waterway and a further fifteen shillings on sound arrival at the mouth. After his father's death in 1889, he operated the Riverstone Hotel with Richard and Sarah. He later engaged in cane farming and was a director of the Mulgrave Mill. According to his headstone he died at Riverstone in August 1930 aged 67.

George Alley's wife Mary Ellen arrived in Cairns with the early settlers with her parents James and Bridget Healy, and brother Frank, in 1876. James Healy was a constable (most likely one of the first police constables in 1876 when a new police station was opened in Cairns). Healy was born at Ballinamuck, Ireland, and had landed in Brisbane in 1866 and joined the police force on 9 September 1868. He was stationed at Cleveland Bay when transferred to Trinity Bay and left Townsville on 28 October 1876. He brought his family to Cairns and but died soon after. His widow married James Hill, a selector on Wrights Creek where for a time he ran the Mulgrave hotel. According to her headstone at Riverstone, Mary Ellen died at Gordonvale in January 1943 aged 69.

== Description ==
The Alley Family Graves site consists of three headstones and three plaques set on a concrete platform containing the graves of six family members. The concrete platform is framed by four palms, and the graves site is located fronting the Gillies Highway to the northwest, and surrounded by sugarcane fields to remaining three sides.

The headstones and platform surrounds appear to be mostly of concrete. The northwestern headstone is the smallest, and has an inlaid stone plaque in memory of Mary Ellen Alley. The centre headstone is engraved in memory of Sarah Blackwell and George Gorham Alley. The southeastern headstone is the tallest, and has a metal plaque affixed to the front engraved in memory of Mary Alley, Willie and William Saunders Alley. There are also three plaques, one of which is in memory of Richard Blackwell (buried Waverley cemetery, Sydney). The remaining two plaques are in memory of James Healy and Bridget Hill (formerly Healy), and William Saunders Alley (b.1887 d. 1977). A small metal nameplate has the name Melrose and Fenwick Ltd, who may have been responsible for the construction of the headstones or grave surrounds.

== Heritage listing ==
Alley Family Graves was listed on the Queensland Heritage Register on 23 August 1999 having satisfied the following criteria.

The place is important in demonstrating the evolution or pattern of Queensland's history.

William Saunders Alley, with his wife and family, was the first to take a bullock team to the Mulgrave River in 1878, and in August 1879 took up the first land on the Mulgrave which consisted of 640 acres (260 ha) and which he named Riverstone. Soon after, in October 1879, Richard Blackwell took up land known as Plain Camp, near where Gordonvale is now located.

The place is important because of its aesthetic significance.

The site is of aesthetic significance, and its highly visible location and well maintained surrounds, including four mature palms, contribute to its local landmark status.

The place has a special association with the life or work of a particular person, group or organisation of importance in Queensland's history.

The Alley Family Graves site has a close association with the life and work of the Alley and Blackwell families - early settlers, timber-getters, and proprietors of the Riverstone Hotel - in the establishment and development of the Mulgrave area south of Cairns in the late 19th and early 20th centuries.

The Alley and Blackwell families were also associated with the establishment of the Mulgrave Mill, and through their association with the Riverstone Hotel and other activities, were well known and highly regarded in the local community.
