= Meringa Sugar Experiment Station =

Historic research station in Queensland, Australia

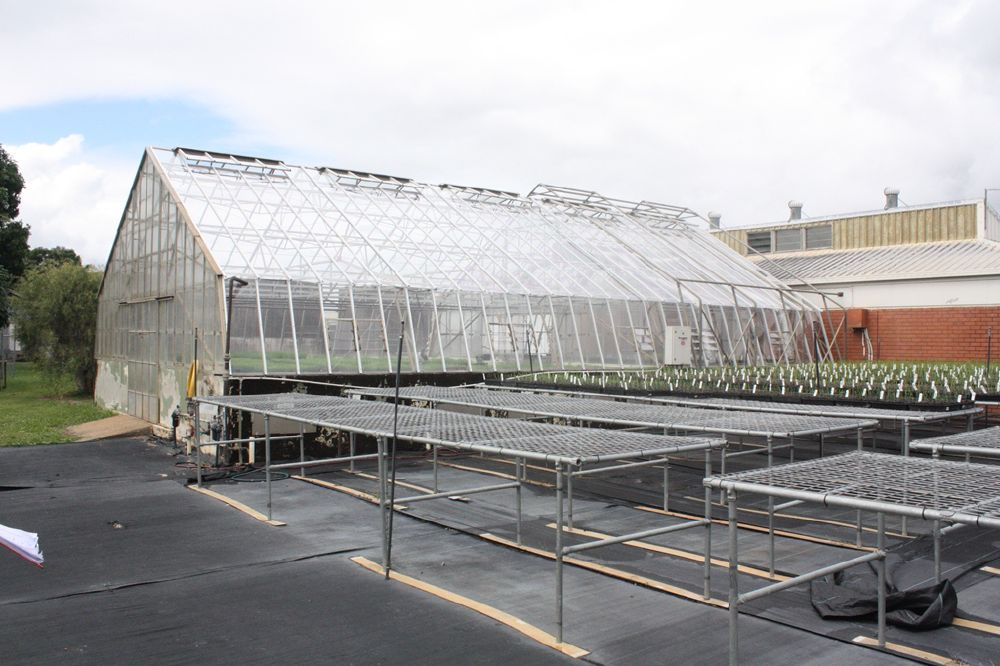
- Meringa Sugar Experiment Station glasshouses, 2013

- Location within Queensland
- 17.0683°S 145.7738°E
- Location: 71378 Bruce Highway, Meringa, Gordonvale, Cairns Region, Queensland, Australia

History
- Built: 1917, 1935, 1957, 1962, 1969

Site notes
- Architect(s): Goodsir & Carlyle, Baker & Wilde, Queensland Department of Public Works

Queensland Heritage Register
- Official name: Meringa Sugar Experiment Station
- Type: state heritage
- Designated: 18 July 2014
- Reference no.: 602835
- Type: Education, research, scientific facility: Experimental station/farm
- Theme: Exploiting, utilising and transforming the land: Agricultural activities; Exploiting, utilising and transforming the land: Experimenting, developing technologies and innovation
- Builders: Queensland Department of Public Works

Meringa Sugar Experiment Station is a heritage-listed research station at 71378 Bruce Highway, Meringa, Gordonvale, Cairns Region, Queensland, Australia. It was designed by Goodsir & Carlyle, Baker & Wilde, and the Queensland Department of Public Works and built from 1914 to 1918 by Queensland Department of Public Works. It was added to the Queensland Heritage Register on 18 July 2014.

== History ==
The Meringa Sugar Experiment Station (SES) is located on the east side of the Bruce Highway about 1 kilometre (0.62 mi) north of the Meringa railway station on the North Coast railway line, and 2 kilometres (1.2 mi) north of the town of Gordonvale. It has been an important part of the Queensland sugar industry since 1917, first as an Entomological Station, researching insect pests, and from the 1930s as a sugarcane breeding facility. In 1935 the Meringa SES bred the first cane toads released in Queensland, and from 1945 experiments with the insecticide benzene hexachloride (BHC) at Meringa were successful in controlling the sugar cane pest, the greyback grub. The Meringa SES is now operated by Sugar Research Australia. Older buildings of cultural heritage significance include: the former Entomologist's residence (1917); a corrugated iron implement and tractor shed (c.1935); a glasshouse (1957); a 1962 brick office and laboratory building; and a 1969 two storey brick office building. More recent buildings of heritage significance include the crossing facility (1977–1980) and the photoperiod facility (1986–2008).

The site of the Meringa SES was once part of a Camping Reserve (R.223) located north of Gordonvale on the Mulgrave River. This was the traditional country of the Yidinjdji people. The area was first settled by Europeans when the Alley and Blackwell families arrived simultaneously from Cairns in 1878 and both families selected land in late 1879. The site of Gordonvale was a Native Police camp in 1885 and later became a small village named Mulgrave, with three pubs, a store and a butcher's shop. The Mulgrave Central Sugar Mill started crushing in 1896 and that year the first part of a town named Nelson (after then Premier of Queensland, Sir Hugh Nelson) was surveyed southwest of the mill, around Swan Street. The sections further north, including what later became Norman Park, were surveyed in 1899. Nelson was renamed Gordonvale (after the pioneer and butcher John Gordon) in 1914 to avoid confusion with towns called Nelson in New South Wales, Victoria, and New Zealand.

The Mulgrave Central Mill was a product of the Sugar Works Guarantee Act 1893 that provided for the erection of approved central mills on a government loan if farmers mortgaged their land as security. After the principal and interest was met, these central mills were then handed to the growers as cooperative mills. Prior to central mills, the plantation system was the main form of sugar production in Queensland. Large landholdings were worked by South Sea Islander labour and sugar was processed at plantation sugar mills. Sugar was first crushed in commercial quantities in Queensland in the early 1860s by Captain Louis Hope, near Cleveland. In 1878 the Queensland Government began selling Far North Queensland land along the Bloomfield, Daintree, Mossman, Barron, Mulgrave and Johnstone Rivers. Land was secured by small farmers and larger companies, and by 1884 the sugar industry was established in the region. Nine sugar plantations were established in Far North Queensland from 1878 to 1891.

The sugar mill of the Pyramid plantation, located south of Gordonvale, operated between 1885 and 1890. However, two main factors led to six Far North Queensland plantations closing by 1891. First, there was a steep fall in sugar prices in 1884. Second, the Queensland Government sought to promote settlement through small land holdings worked by farmers of European descent. Legislation from the mid-1880s, along with later Australian Government legislation, led to the end of the use of indentured South Sea Islander labour by 1904. The system of large plantations with their own sugar mills was replaced, by the early 20th century, with a system of small farms and central sugar mills.

Although the method of growing sugar changed, it continued to play an important part in the economy of Far North Queensland. After the Federation of Australia, the sugar industry was regarded as vital to Australia's economic priorities; and also as a means to settle the north of the country as part of Australia's defence strategy. From the 1910s the Australian sugar industry became highly protected, regulated and increasingly mechanised, receiving active support from both Queensland and Australian governments through legislation. The number of small sugarcane growers in Queensland grew from 359 in 1893 to 4,238 in 1911. Later, by the beginning of World War II, sugar was an important component in the Queensland economy, providing export earnings as Queensland's major crop and promoting regional growth; as a proportion of primary production, sugar grew from less than 10% in 1910 to 18% in 1940.

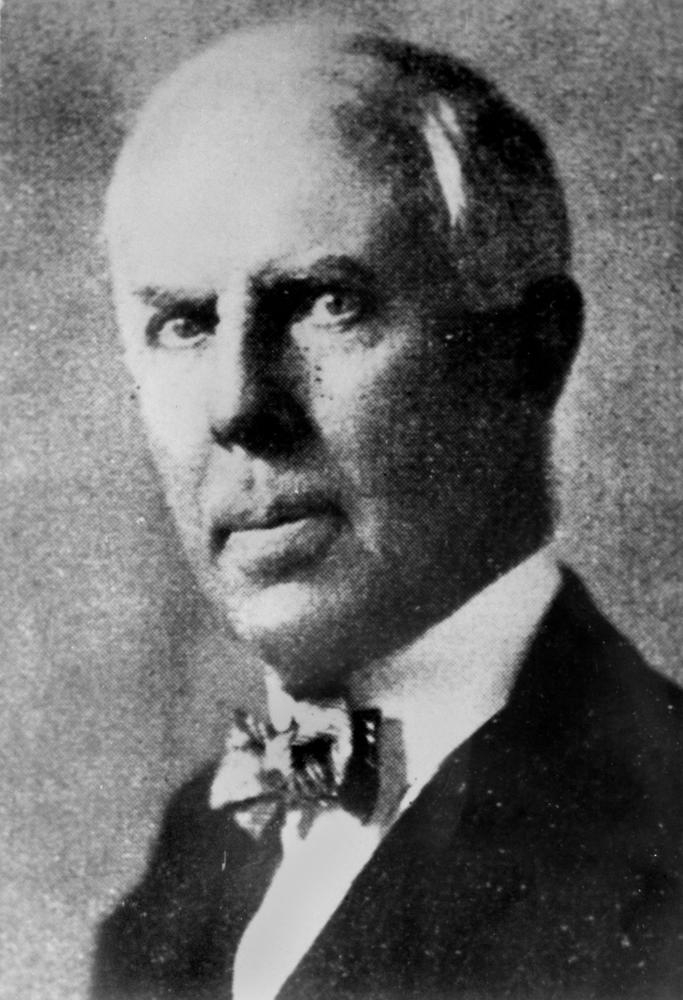
Dr Walter Maxwell

Research into disease-resistance, farming techniques and technological innovation was also recognised as important by the 20th century and was supported by the Queensland Government. The first Sugar Experiment Stations (SES) in the world were located in Louisiana, USA, and Java (both established 1885), followed by Hawaii (1895), and Saint Kitts, West Indies, (1899). Queensland's first SES was established in late 1900 at "The Lagoons", Mackay. However, sugar growers wanted government research into soils and new cane varieties, and a laboratory was added at Mackay in 1898. The next year it was announced that the Mackay nursery would become a SES. Walter Maxwell, Director of the SES in Hawaii, was invited to Queensland, visiting in December 1899. He later accepted a job as Director of the Bureau of Sugar Experiment Stations (BSES), starting in November 1900.

The BSES was established under The Sugar Experiment Stations Act of 1900. Initially administered by Queensland's Department of Agriculture (later the Department of Agriculture and Stock), the BSES undertook research to assist growers and millers improve the breeding, planting, growing, harvesting and milling of sugar cane. The work of the BSES was financed through a Sugar Fund, established by the 1900 Act.

Maxwell, who headed the BSES until 1909, recommended a total of three SES in Queensland, but this did not occur immediately. Although a soils laboratory and Director's headquarters operated in Bundaberg from August 1901 to 1910, an SES was not established in the area until a cane farm with two residences was acquired at East Bundaberg in 1913. Prior to 1913, field experiments with sugar cane varieties were carried out at the Mackay SES. A third SES was established at South Johnstone (south of Innisfail) in 1917–18, located across the river from the sugar mill, and sugar cane was growing there by December 1919.

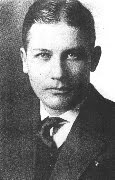
Alexandre Arsène Girault, entomologist, 1904

Entomological research began in 1911 with the appointment of the American Entomologist Alexandre Arsène Girault to work in Nelson (Gordonvale) in a rented building. Alan Parkhurst Dodd (son of the "Butterfly Man of Kuranda", Frederick Parkhurst Dodd) was appointed assistant entomologist, and worked at Gordonvale, and later Meringa, between 1912 and 1921 (he spent three and a half years of this period serving in the Australian Imperial Force during World War I). Dodd later went on to play a major role in the defeat of prickly pear infestation by the Cactoblastis moth. Girault was replaced by Edmund Jarvis in 1914. At this time the insect of most concern was the greyback grub, the offspring of the greyback cockchafer (cane beetle, Dermolepida albohirtum). Although the adult beetle ate cane leaves, the grub inflicted more damage by attacking the cane's roots.

To further research into cane grubs, in January 1916 the Department of Agriculture and Stock asked for five acres (two hectares) of land near the Gordonvale State School for an Entomological Reserve; with room for residences, student quarters, a laboratory, office and insectarium, plus experimental crops. In February the Land Commissioner instead offered the Department part of the 480 acres (190 ha) Camping Reserve (R.223), located north of Gordonvale, and just north of a Reserve for a Prison (R.483). Ten acres (four hectares) with the best soil, thickly forested and located at the southern end of the road frontage of the Camping Reserve, was surveyed as Portion 29 in June 1916, and was gazetted a Reserve for Entomological Purposes, Reserve 1544 (R.502) in August 1916.

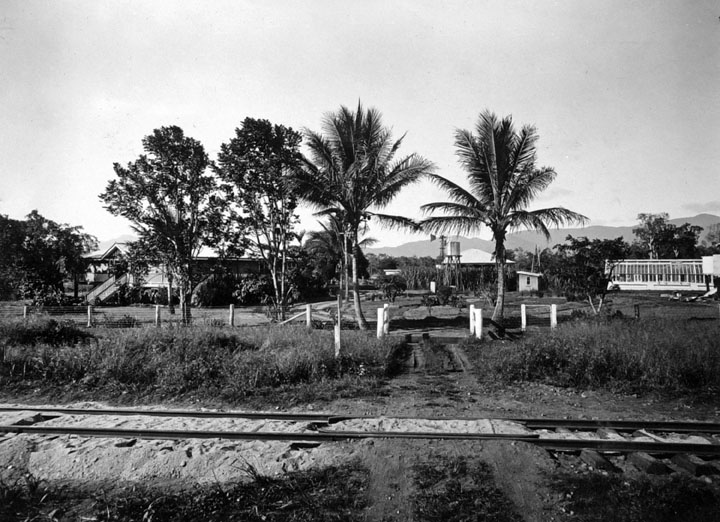
Meringa Sugar Experiment Station, circa 1935

The site (at Meringa) became the Entomological Station for the BSES, and two residences, a laboratory and an insectary were constructed during 1917. These buildings, all highset and timber framed, were located in the southern half of the reserve. Construction plans for the Entomologist's residence were prepared by January 1917, by the Public Works Department. The two bedroom house included a dining room and drawing room, encircling verandas and a semi-detached kitchen and maid's room. A wash house was under the kitchen.

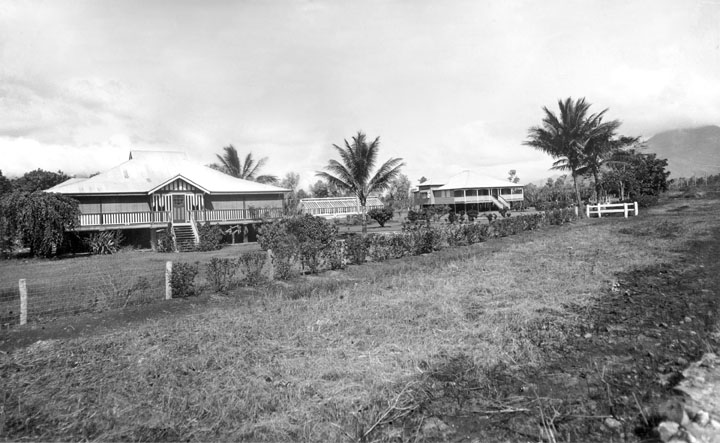
Entomologist's house, circa 1935

The residence was first occupied by Dr James F Illingworth, who replaced Jarvis as Entomologist in 1917. Illingworth began extensive field tests with lime, fertilizers, arsenic and creosote as soil fumigants to see how they impacted on cane grub attacks. These experiments were not successful, but Illingworth did provide cane growers with advice on improved cultivation methods. Prior to 1975 the Meringa facility was administered by Illingworth (1917–1921), Edmund Jarvis (1921–1934), Edwin J Barke (1934–1938), Reginald William Mungomery (1938–1945), James Hardie Buzacott (1945–1947, 1966–1970), Gilbert Bates (1947–1966) and JC Skinner (from 1970).

The Assistant Entomologist's residence was located south of the Entomologist's residence. The Entomological Laboratory, east of the Entomologist's residence, consisted of four rooms, with a veranda to three sides, and a small laboratory enclosed at the end of one veranda. The laboratory building later contained a museum, holding displays of various insect pests for the education of sugar farmers.

Entomology was only one aspect of the BSES's operations. In the late 1920s the BSES was split into four divisions: Soils and Agriculture, Pathology, Entomology, and Mill Technology. When the Pathology Division was formed, Queensland had a greater number of sugar cane diseases than any other cane-growing country. By 1931 the BSES had three SES's (Mackay, Bundaberg, and South Johnstone); one entomological station (at Meringa); two entomological laboratories (Mackay and Bundaberg); plus administrative offices and laboratories in Brisbane. In 1933 the Advisory Committee of the BSES was established. After being renamed in 1934 the first meeting of the Advisory Board of the BSES was held in 1935.

Although the Meringa facility initially began as an entomological station, it commenced research into cane varieties in the 1930s. Prior to the opening of the South Johnstone SES the BSES was unable to obtain seedlings from arrows (the inflorescence containing the sugarcane's flowers) picked at the Mackay SES; but seedlings were raised from local fuzz (seed) at the South Johnstone SES in 1921, and controlled pollination was conducted there from 1926. However, the BSES decided that South Johnstone was not the best site for cane breeding, and this work was transferred to Meringa from 1934, while the South Johnstone site was taken over by the Bureau of Tropical Agriculture. The entomological, cane breeding and agricultural work of the BSES in the north was now concentrated at Meringa. In 1934 the BSES's Divisions of Pathology and Entomology were combined.

After South Johnstone closed, seedlings were raised at Meringa, Mackay and Bundaberg, and glasshouses were built at all three stations in the 1930s. While cross-breeding was conducted at a farm at Freshwater from 1930 (all crossing being conducted there by 1935), this eventually transferred to Meringa, where 300 varieties were in cultivation by 1950. Meringa was the headquarters for all the BSES's cane breeding and over time became the centre for pathology, agronomy and mill technology in the north. It was also the point of origin for all "Q" cane varieties, which in 2013 comprise 98% of the sugar cane grown in Queensland.

To accommodate the cane breeding programme at Meringa, adjacent land was obtained. Portion 78 (R.483), to the south, was gazetted a Reserve for Experimental Farm on 27 August 1938. Two other reserves were added prior to 30 April 1953 (when all four of the Meringa SES's reserves were cancelled and replaced with a special lease): Portion 133 (R.867), gazetted a Reserve for Departmental Purposes on 14 January 1939; and Portion 134 (R.1003), gazetted a Reserve for Experimental Farm on 20 January 1951. Another block was obtained in 1959, east of the original station. After further acquisitions to the east and north, by 2014 the Meringa SES covered 63 hectares (160 acres).

Along with the acquisition of extra land, a burst of construction occurred at Meringa prior to its official opening as an SES on 13 September 1935, by Frank Bulcock, Minister for Agriculture and Stock. Work included the conversion of the Assistant Entomologist's residence into a soils laboratory, with a museum and library (completed in 1935). A 60-by-18-foot (18.3 by 5.5 m) timber-framed glasshouse supported on concrete base walls was completed by December 1934, and a corrugated iron-clad implement and tractor shed, fertiliser store and stables building erected by L Underwood was completed in 1935, with a cost of £861.

In addition, a four bedroom timber worker's cottage was erected on Portion 78, and was nearing completion by December 1934. In 1947–1948 this building (removed after 2003) was altered and extended for use by James Hardie Buzacott, who was appointed as Senior Plant Breeder in 1947. Around the same time a three-car garage was built. Around 1949 a toilet was added adjacent to the bathroom of the Entomologist's residence, which by this time had two cupboards (no longer extant) built at the corners of the bedrooms and extending onto the northern veranda, and a new doorway was added between the bedrooms.

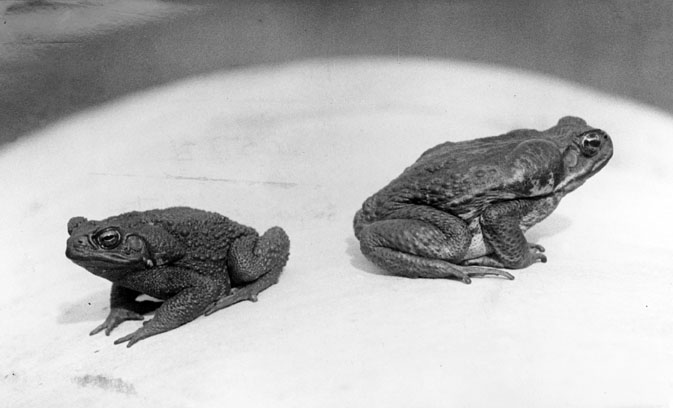
Cane toads at the Meringa Sugar Experiment Station, circa 1935

Apart from the main buildings there was also a special enclosure for cane toads at the Meringa SES. Around 100 toads (Bufo marinus) arrived at Meringa from Hawaii in June 1935, escorted by Assistant Entomologist RW Mungomery. It was hoped that they would eat cane beetles, even though Mungomery wrote in 1933 that the beetles did not spend enough time on the ground for the toads to be effective. After being bred in the special enclosure 2400 toads were released at sites around Gordonvale in August 1935. The retired NSW Government Entomologist Walter Froggatt opposed the toad releases, and successfully lobbied the Australian Department of Health to ban them in November 1935. In January 1936 Froggatt wrote "This giant toad, immune from enemies, omnivorous in its habits, and breeding all year round, may become as great a pest as the rabbit or cactus". However, Minister Bulcock soon persuaded Queensland Premier William Forgan Smith to recommend to Prime Minister Joseph Lyons that the ban be overturned, and the releases continued from September 1936, creating an ecological nightmare while also failing to control cane beetles.

While the Meringa SES was occupied with introducing the cane toad to Australia, in 1935 the Mackay SES moved to a better site, on the Peak Downs Highway at Te Kowai. A fourth SES was officially opened west of Ayr in 1954, on 90 acres (36 ha) of land purchased in 1948. A fifth SES was built at Tully in the mid-1970s. The BSES also operated a Pathology farm at Eight Mile Plains from c.1952 to 2001, after which it was relocated to Woodford.

Although the number of SES's increased, Meringa remained the most important. During the 1940s and 1950s, annual farmers' field days were held at Meringa, where by this time all cross pollination for Queensland was carried out. Experiments with benzene hexachloride (BHC) insecticide, also known as "gammexane", began at Meringa in 1945, which led to the successful control of greyback grubs - after farmers were allowed to use it from 1947. In 1957 the Queensland Cane Growers' Council dedicated a plaque on a granite boulder at the entrance to the Meringa station. This recognised "the major service performed by the Bureau of Sugar Experiment Stations to the cane growers of Queensland in initiating and carrying to fruition the research which led to the successful control of the cane grub the industry's worst pest". However, due to concerns about environmental contamination and a threat to human health the use of BHC in Australian agriculture ended in the 1980s.

Sugar producers harboured concerns about the lack of autonomy of the BSES. The Sugar Producers' Association formed a committee to draft the constitution for a new sugar industry-funded and controlled research institute. Sugar Research Limited was incorporated on 22 February 1949. The inaugural board of Sugar Research Ltd first met in March 1949 and decided to establish the Sugar Research Institute's central laboratories in Mackay. The Sugar Research Institute - "a monument to the Australian sugar industry" - was opened on 22 August 1953 by the Australian Treasurer, Sir Arthur Fadden.

While this was occurring the Queensland Government took steps to separate the BSES from the public service. In 1951 the SES Advisory Board was replaced by the SES Board, a Crown instrumentality (statutory corporation) set up to administer the BSES. Its four members included the Minister for Primary Industries, the Under Secretary for Agriculture and Stock, a growers' representative, and a manufacturers' representative. All property was transferred to the Board, which was a body corporate.

Construction continued at Meringa in the 1950s and 1960s. The 1935 glasshouse was destroyed by Cyclone Agnes in 1956 and a new glasshouse was constructed just to the east the following year. In 1955 the original laboratory, which had been used as a residence for the previous 20 years, was remodelled as a plant breeding laboratory. It was later removed from the site between 1979 and 1990. By 1957 a crossing facility existed on Portion 134, north of Hall Road.

Construction was not just limited to the Meringa SES. Between the early 1950s and the early 1970s new office-laboratory complexes were built at all four BSES experimental stations. Further infrastructure was required at Meringa to accommodate increasing staff numbers as plant breeding activities expanded and Meringa became the regional centre for research in the fields of agronomy, entomology and mill technology. In 1962 a new one-storey brick office and laboratory building was constructed at Meringa, between the 1917 buildings, to a design by the architectural firm DB Goodsir & HJ Carlyle (St Lucia, Brisbane).

Harold J Carlyle had won the student medal at the Central Technical College in 1933, and had been articled to R Ashley Shaw, who later took him into partnership. Carlyle and David B Goodsir were in partnership from 1946, sometimes still working with Shaw. The firm designed the new Innisfail hospital and the Maryborough Fire Station in 1949, Emmanuel College at the University of Queensland in 1950, the Queensland Spastic Welfare League building at New Farm in December 1953, and the BSES head office on Gregory Terrace, Brisbane, in 1958. The firm later evolved to become Goodsir, Baker and Wilde.

The new office building was initially designed to accommodate plant breeders, entomologists and a mill technologist. There were eight offices in the western section of the building, and toilets and a laboratory in the eastern section. The configuration of the western section has since been changed by a modern fit-out that has created a larger central reception area, but the laboratory section of the building was intact in 2013.

In 1969 a new two-storey brick office building, designed by Goodsir & Carlyle, Baker & Wilde, was added to the south of the 1962 building, on the site of the former Assistant Entomologist's residence, which was sold for removal. At this time, staff numbers were at a peak, comprising 20 officers and six field labourers. The 1969 office building included offices for a Mill Technologist, Pathologist, Agronomist, and Technical and Field Assistants, as well as a library, on the first floor; and a lecture theatre, dark room, and workshops for plant breeding, agronomy and entomology on the ground floor.

By 1973, cane varieties bred by BSES made up 61% of all varieties grown in Queensland. By 1979 several garages were built to the east of the 1957 glasshouse, and soon after a headhouse was built south of the glasshouse. New crossing facilities were also constructed north of Hall Road in 1977–1980. In 1986 the first of three photoperiod houses (the westernmost) was built (duplicated in 1998 and 2008), north of the creek dividing Portion 29. Photoperiod houses provide an environment for the artificial initiation of flowering in sugarcane.

In 2003 BSES Limited, an industry owned company, was formed to replace the BSES. A seed storage freezer room was built to the east of the photoperiod houses in 2009, and a juice shed was built east of the freezer room in 2012. In mid-2013 the assets and activities of BSES Limited were combined with those of the Sugar Research and Development Corporation (SRDC) and the milling research activities of Sugar Research Limited (SRL) to form Sugar Research Australia (SRA), a single-entity research management and research company formed to address national research, development and experimentation priorities.

By 2013 the headquarters of SRA was located at Meiers Road, Indooroopilly, Brisbane with SES's at Meringa, Tully, Ingham (established post 1975), Brandon (Ayr), Te Kowai (Mackay), and Kalkie (Bundaberg East), and a Pathology Farm at Woodford.

The Meringa SES is currently the major plant breeding station for the Australian sugar industry, and the only location where field crosses of sugar cane varieties are made. During the lifetime of the Meringa SES, a number of scientists whose work has been of importance to the Queensland sugar industry have been associated with it. These include E Jarvis (1869–1935, entomologist), JF Illingworth (American entomologist), EJ Barke (cane breeder), RW Mungomery (1901–1972, entomologist), JH Buzacott (1902–1984, plant breeder), G Bates (entomologist), G Wilson (entomologist), and Alan Parkhurst Dodd (entomologist).

== Description ==
Located south of Cairns and 1 kilometre (0.62 mi) north of Meringa, in Far North Queensland, the Meringa Sugar Experiment Station comprises 63 hectares (160 acres) of land. It is bounded to the west by the Bruce Highway and North Coast railway line, is dissected by Hall Road and Lavell Road, and is surrounded by agricultural land. The land within the heritage boundary comprises 10 hectares (25 acres).

The main complex of research buildings, set on flat terrain amongst mature trees and lawn and accessed from the highway via a circular drive, includes: an Office and Laboratory building (1962); an Entomologist's Residence (1917); an Office building (1969); a Glasshouse (1957); and an Implement and Tractor Shed (1935). To the north, separated from the main complex by a creek, are sugarcane fields and a photoperiod facility with three buildings (1986, 1998, 2008). A crossing facility (1977–80) is located on the northern side of Hall Road.

=== Office and Laboratory (1962) ===
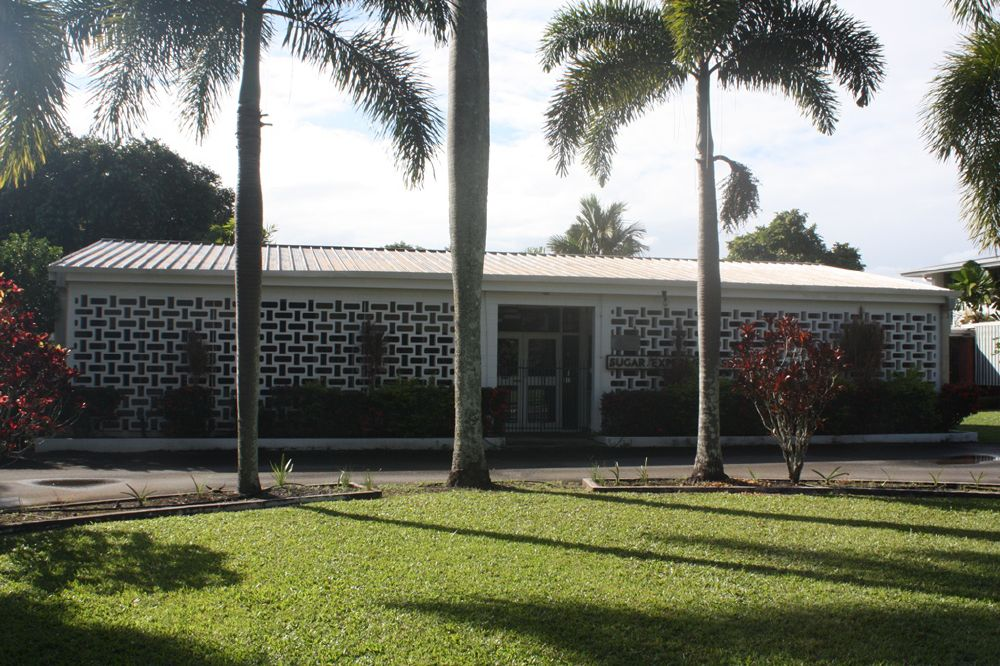
1962 laboratory from the West, 2013

The Office and Laboratory (1962) is a one-storey, slab-on-ground, cavity brick building with a steel-framed, gable roof. The exterior is red facebrick and the roof is clad with pan-and-rib metal sheets. The T-shaped building, has two perpendicular wings (offices in the front and laboratory behind) connected by a covered breezeway.

Fronting the office building is a low garden bed and a symmetrical, concrete screen block wall from slab to soffit, painted white. A wide central opening leads across a narrow porch to the recessed entry of the office behind. The sides and rear have large, aluminium-framed, sliding windows, some with spandrel panels of sheet material, and some with aluminium awnings. Modern doors are cut into the sides of the office portion and the laboratory portion retains original, timber double doors with glazing panels on the rear (east). The front porch and breezeway floors are concrete with alternating black and grey stripes and the ceilings are grids of sheets and battens with original, square, plastic and metal light fittings. The office has a modern fitout and partition walls.

Access from the office to the laboratory is through the breezeway. The intact laboratory layout comprises rendered masonry partitions forming a large laboratory space and four smaller rooms that accommodate equipment stores and a furnace room. The laboratory is brightly-lit through north-facing glazing comprising large, aluminium-framed sliding windows and glass louvre fanlights complete with original aluminium hardware. An office area is accommodated within the larger laboratory space by a part-height, timber-framed partition with glazing panels and clad with sheet material. The floor is clad with modern vinyl and the ceiling is a grid of acoustic tiles. Wet areas retain original ceramic tile splashbacks. All rooms retain laboratory equipment, including benches, storage cupboards, fume cupboards, cabinets, sinks, and tapware, as well as an array of laboratory equipment.

=== Entomologist's Residence (1917) ===
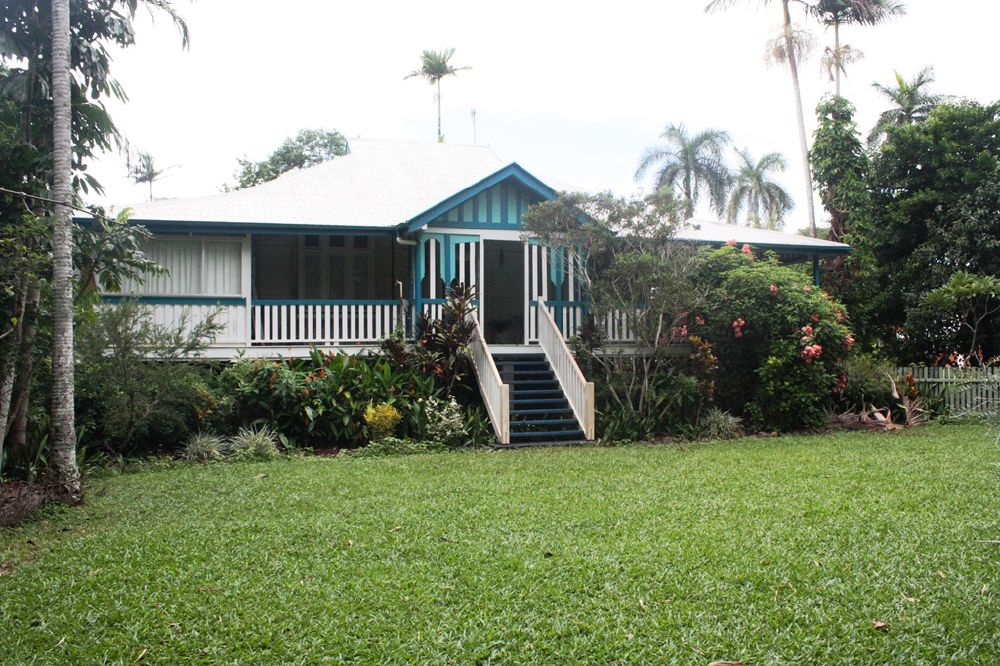
Entomologist house, 2013

Adjacent to the north of the entrance driveway is the Entomologist's Residence, a high-set, one-storey, timber-framed and clad building. The house faces west and comprises a central core encircled by a wide verandah, with a kitchen wing attached to the rear verandah. The house is supported on concrete posts and the understorey is largely open. It stands to the northwest of the other buildings and has a fenced front yard.

The house core has exposed timber framing on the exterior, sheltered by a large hipped roof that is continuous over the verandahs. The roof is clad with corrugated metal sheets and has small, louvred gablets venting the roof space. The front is symmetrical around a projecting entry gable, which has decorative timber battening and post brackets, and a veranda door with a circular panel of glazing.

The verandah is timber-framed with a timber balustrade and is enclosed on the north and east (rear) sides. On the northern side the original timber balustrade is retained below aluminium-framed sliding windows. The rear veranda is enclosed with timber-framed casements above the balustrade.

The kitchen wing is clad in weatherboards and has a small, hipped roof clad with corrugated metal sheets. A stove recess projects from the eastern wall. The wing has large, timber-framed double hung windows and a timber stair on the north side, providing access to the garden.

A wide timber stair leads to the front verandah, which has a raked, timber, v-jointed board ceiling and a timber board floor. Two timber-framed oriel windows project onto the western verandah and these have decorative timber brackets and narrow, double-hung sashes. A hexagonal bay window with French doors projects onto the rear veranda. The eastern end of the southern verandah retains an early electric light fitting and opaque glass shade.

The centrally located front door of timber with glass panels provides entry into a short hall. The layout of the core comprises two bedrooms on the northern side, and a large living space on the south. The interior partitions are timber single-skin, v-jointed board walls with chamfered belt rails. The rooms have timber floors and moulded timber skirtings, architraves and plate rails. Cornices in the living room are moulded while those of the bedrooms are rounded. The flat ceilings are v-jointed, timber boards. The living room is in two parts, connected by a wide opening framed with decorative timber scrollwork. Internal doors are panelled timber, and opening onto the verandah from all rooms are glazed French doors, some of which have opaque painted glazing with an etched border. All doors have operable, glazed fanlights. The main core retains original door and window hardware including brass opening rods, bolts, catches, and rim locks, as well as original door knobs. The northern verandah has an early enclosure accommodating a toilet and bathroom. (The bathroom linings of sheet material and tiles are not of cultural heritage significance.) The southern end of the eastern verandah has a part-height partition with a central opening, lined with v-jointed timber boards.

The kitchen wing comprises two rooms, although a timber member in the ceiling of the large room indicates the position of a removed wall. The internal partition is a single-skin timber, v-jointed board wall with chamfered timber belt rails. The rooms have timber floors, architraves and cornices. The flat ceilings are v-jointed, timber boards. The stove recess is lined with sheet material. The kitchen cabinetry is modern and not of cultural heritage significance.

The residence has established gardens including trees, shrubs, and lawns.

=== Office (1969) ===
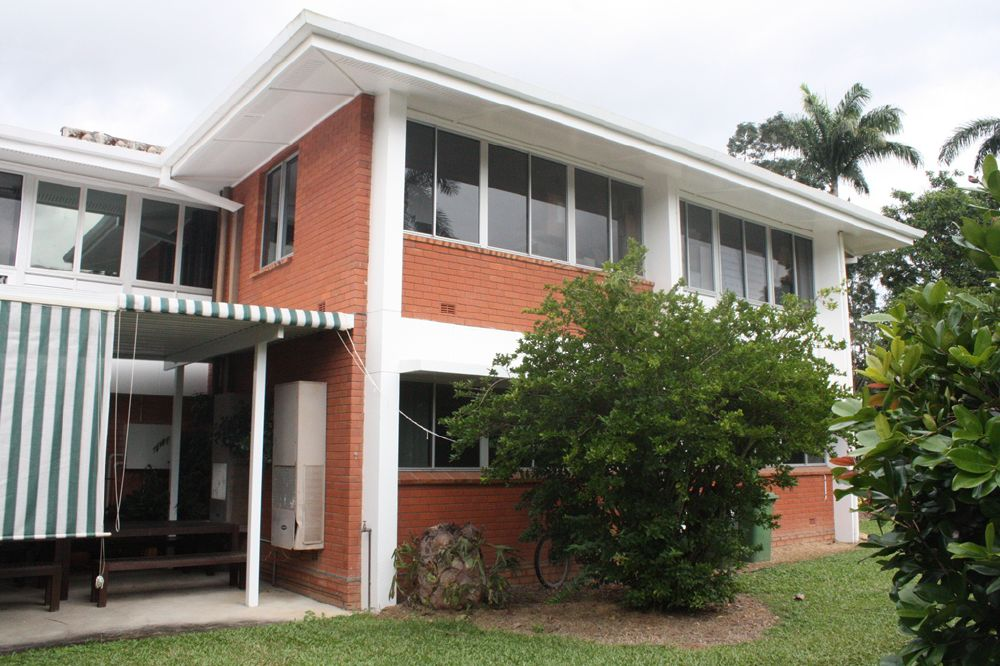
1969 Offices, 2013

A covered walkway of facebrick pillars supporting a steel-framed roof runs south from the breezeway of the Office and Laboratory (1962) to the front of the Office (1969), which faces north. This L-shaped building contains workshops, a photography dark room and a lecture room on the ground floor, and offices, a laboratory and a library on the first floor. It is a concrete-frame, slab-on-ground structure with a shallow-pitched, hipped roof clad with metal sheets. The exterior comprises red facebrick panels within a white painted concrete frame. The eaves are wide and the soffit is clad with flat sheet material with ventilation slots.

All elevations have aluminium-framed sliding windows, most have terracotta tile sills, and some have spandrel panels of metal louvres. The western elevation is facebrick with a pattern of projecting brick headers. Side access into the building is through timber doors with glazed panels, and a steel stair leads to the first floor on the eastern side.

The ground floor has a wide, recessed entrance porch on the northern side, enclosed with a metal grille and hit-and-miss brickwork. The porch is partly double-height and has a concrete floor. The layout of the ground floor is intact with the porch providing access to the large lecture room on the northern side and the workshops on the southern side - the westernmost workshop is entered through a former refrigerator room, which is now a kitchen. The workshops have vinyl tile floors and flat, gridded ceilings of sheet material. They retain laboratory benches, cupboards, and sinks. The porch also provides access to smaller rooms: a photography dark room at the western end store rooms and a toilet and shower room at the eastern end. A steel-framed stair with concrete treads, a steel balustrade, and a timber handrail rises within the porch up to the first floor.

The layout of the first floor is intact. A large landing at the top of the stair leads to a library, laboratory, offices, and a central corridor with offices opening off either side. The floors are original vinyl tiles and the flat ceiling is sheet material with a square, timber cornice. The partitions around the landing, in the library, and in the principal offices are clear-finished timber boards with a black skirting. The corridor partitions and those between the other offices are part-height and part-glazed, timber-framed, and clad with sheet material. Internal doors are clear-finished timber. Those of the library have glazed panels.

=== The Glasshouse (1957) ===
To the east of the Office (1969) is the glasshouse, a one-storey, steel-framed, glazed structure supported on concrete half-height wall upstands and slab. The glazing incorporates operable ventilation at the ridge as well as louvres at sill level. Further ventilation is via square openings in the half-height concrete walls, closed with metal flaps on the exterior. The steel frame incorporates open-web trusses and other, more-complex, articulated trusses. The glasshouse is divided into two rooms by a steel-framed, glazed partition with a connecting glazed, sliding door. The smaller of the two rooms has a mechanical ventilation system of exposed, high-level ducting and can be shaded by an external removable shade cloth supported on a steel frame outside the glazing. The concrete floor in both rooms has perimeter drains that empty onto the ground outside the glasshouse.

=== The Implement and Tractor Shed (1935) ===
To the east of the glasshouse is the implement and tractor shed, a one-storey, timber-framed, slab-on-ground structure. It has a gable roof and the walls and roof are clad with corrugated metal sheets. On the southern side are timber-framed, double-hung sash windows. A tram line runs along the northern side of the building. Abutting the eastern end of the building is a similar, gable roofed shed and on the southern side is a lean-to, steel-framed awning, neither of which are of cultural heritage significance.

The shed is partitioned with single-skin timber, v-jointed board walls with chamfered timber belt rails to form four areas - the implement and tractor shed; the stable (divided into stalls and a former harness and feed room, now a lunchroom); the store; and the fertiliser store and mixing room. At the eastern end, the implement and tractor shed is a large room with two large metal garage doors on the north side, metal double doors on the east side, and metal mesh doors on the south side. It is unlined internally and the floor is concrete. In the centre of the shed, the stables include a former harness and feed room on the southern side, and four horse stalls on the northern side. The large harness and feed room is accessed from a timber-framed double door on the southern elevation. The room has a concrete floor and a flat ceiling of sheet material, timber shelving, and early timber desks. This room connects to the stalls via a timber double door. The two easternmost stalls retain original timber partitions and board doors on the northern side, and a high-level, steel-framed, glass louvre window provides stall ventilation. The stalls have a concrete floor with upstands and a fall to aid in mucking out to the exterior.

At the western end of the shed are two rooms - the store (southwest corner); and the fertiliser store and mixing room (northwest corner). The store is a small room accessed from the western side via a pair of timber-framed, braced board doors. It has a partial ceiling of timber boards, a concrete floor, and timber shelves. The fertiliser store and mixing room is accessed from the western side via a pair of timber-framed, braced board doors above which is a further pair of doors for loading goods into a mezzanine level. The room has a concrete floor and a timber bench running around three sides, which can be reached from the exterior through a pair of large timber shutters on the northern side.

=== Photoperiod facility (1986–2008) ===
Three photoperiod houses are located north of the creek and the main complex. Each photoperiod house is a large volume, steel framed structure on a concrete slab, with gabled roof and fascia clad in sheet metal. Set within the steel structure, insulated panels divide the house into three longitudinal chambers, with openings to the north sealed by roller doors. The environment in the chambers is created and controlled through mechanical and electrical services to simulate external weather conditions and each chamber contains tram lines and automated cane trolleys.

=== Crossing facility (1977–80) ===
The crossing facility, surrounded by thick vegetation, is located on the north side of Hall Road. It comprises two steel, open-sided structures with gabled metal and translucent sheet roofs. Within the structures, longitudinal rows of steel framing support the lanterns used in cane crossing.

== Heritage listing ==
Meringa Sugar Experiment Station was listed on the Queensland Heritage Register on 18 July 2014 having satisfied the following criteria.

The place is important in demonstrating the evolution or pattern of Queensland's history.

The Meringa Sugar Experiment Station (SES) was established in 1917 as the first and only Entomological Station of the Queensland Government's Bureau of Sugar Experiment Stations (BSES). It is a product of the Queensland Government's efforts to assist the Queensland sugar industry, which has been an important part of the Queensland economy since the 1860s.

The Entomologist's residence (1917) is important surviving evidence of the period when Meringa was an Entomological station. The 1935 implement and tractor shed and the 1957 glasshouse are both products of the sugar breeding program conducted at Meringa from the mid-1930s, while the 1960s office buildings are evidence of the peak period of staffing at Meringa. The crossing facility (1977–80) and the photoperiod facility (1986–2008) are important evidence of leading technological advancements in the plant breeding program.

The place is also the site of important scientific endeavours, including: the introduction of cane toads into Queensland; breeding new sugar cane varieties; and testing insecticides to control sugar cane pests.

The place is important in demonstrating the principal characteristics of a particular class of cultural places.

The Meringa SES research complex is important in demonstrating the main components of a Sugar Experiment Station that has evolved, and continues to evolve, over time. These include residential, office, and laboratory buildings; plus a glasshouse, implement and tractor shed, land for experimental crops and other structures associated with the breeding program, such as crossing and photoperiod facilities.

The place has a special association with the life or work of a particular person, group or organisation of importance in Queensland's history.

The Meringa SES has a long and special association (since 1917) with Queensland's BSES, and with the work of the BSES's notable research scientists, including E Jarvis, JF Illingworth, EJ Barke, RW Mungomery, JH Buzacott, G Bates, G Wilson, and Alan Parkhurst Dodd. Since 1900 the BSES has played a crucial role in the development of the Queensland and Australian sugar industry. Sugar Research Australia, formed in 2013, incorporates Queensland's BSES and continues this important association, with the Meringa SES now the major breeding station for the whole Australian sugar industry.
