= Gordonvale, Queensland =

Gordonvale
- Town
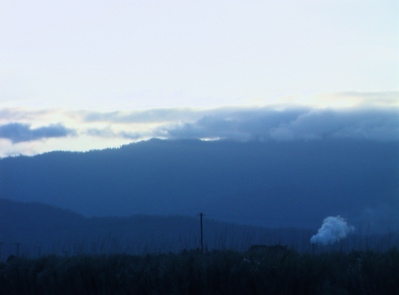
- Mulgrave Central Mill and mountains

- Interactive map of Gordonvale
- Coordinates: 17.0936°S 145.7866°E
- Country: Australia
- State: Queensland
- City: Cairns
- LGA: Cairns Region
- Location: 23.2 km (14.4 mi) S of Cairns CBD; 327 km (203 mi) NNW of Townsville; 1,683 km (1,046 mi) NNW of Brisbane
- Established: 1877

Government
  - State electorate: Mulgrave
  - Federal division: Kennedy

Area
  - Total: 57.2 km^{2} (22.1 sq mi)
- Elevation: 10 m (33 ft)

Population
  - Total: 6,944 (2021 census)
  - Density: 121.40/km^{2} (314.42/sq mi)
- Time zone: UTC+10:00 (AEST)
- Postcode: 4865
Localities around Gordonvale
| Mount Peter | Wrights Creek; Packers Camp | Green Hill |
| Lamb Range | Gordonvale | Aloomba |
| Little Mulgrave | Goldsborough; Wooroonooran | Aloomba |

Gordonvale is a rural sugar-growing town and locality situated on the southern side of Cairns in the Cairns Region, Queensland, Australia. In the 2021 census, the locality of Gordonvale had a population of 6,944 people.

At Gordonvale in June 1935, the cane toad was introduced in a failed attempt at controlling the native Frenchi beetle and the greyback cane beetle.

== Geography ==
Gordonvale lies approximately 23 kilometres (14 mi) south of the Cairns central business district and is just east of the Gillies Range which leads to the Atherton Tableland.

The locality is bounded to the south-east by the Mulgrave River. The land is generally flat and low-lying (approx 10 metres (33 ft) above sea level), but on the eastern, southern and western boundaries of the locality the land begins to rise sharply as the locality is surrounded by mountainous terrain formating part of a number of ranges: Islet Hills to the north-west, Lamb Range to the south-west, Bellenden Ker Range to the south, and Thompson Range to the east. The predominant land use in the locality is growing sugarcane.

The town of Gordonvale is on the Mulgrave River and is on the south-eastern edge of the locality. The Mulgrave Sugar Mill is on the western side of the town in Gordon Street.

The Bruce Highway enters the locality from the south-east (Aloomba), bypasses the town centre to the west and then proceeds north to exit to Wrights Creek.

The North Coast railway line enters the locality from the south-east (Aloomba), passes through the town and then travels north through the locality to exit to Wrights Creek. The town is served by the Gordonvale railway station which is located immediately adjacent to the sugar mill. The Kamma railway siding is just prior to the exit to Wrights Creek. The former Meringa railway station in the centre of the locality has been abandoned. There is an extensive network of cane tramways through the locality and beyond that deliver harvested sugarcane to the Mulgrave Sugar Mill.

== History ==
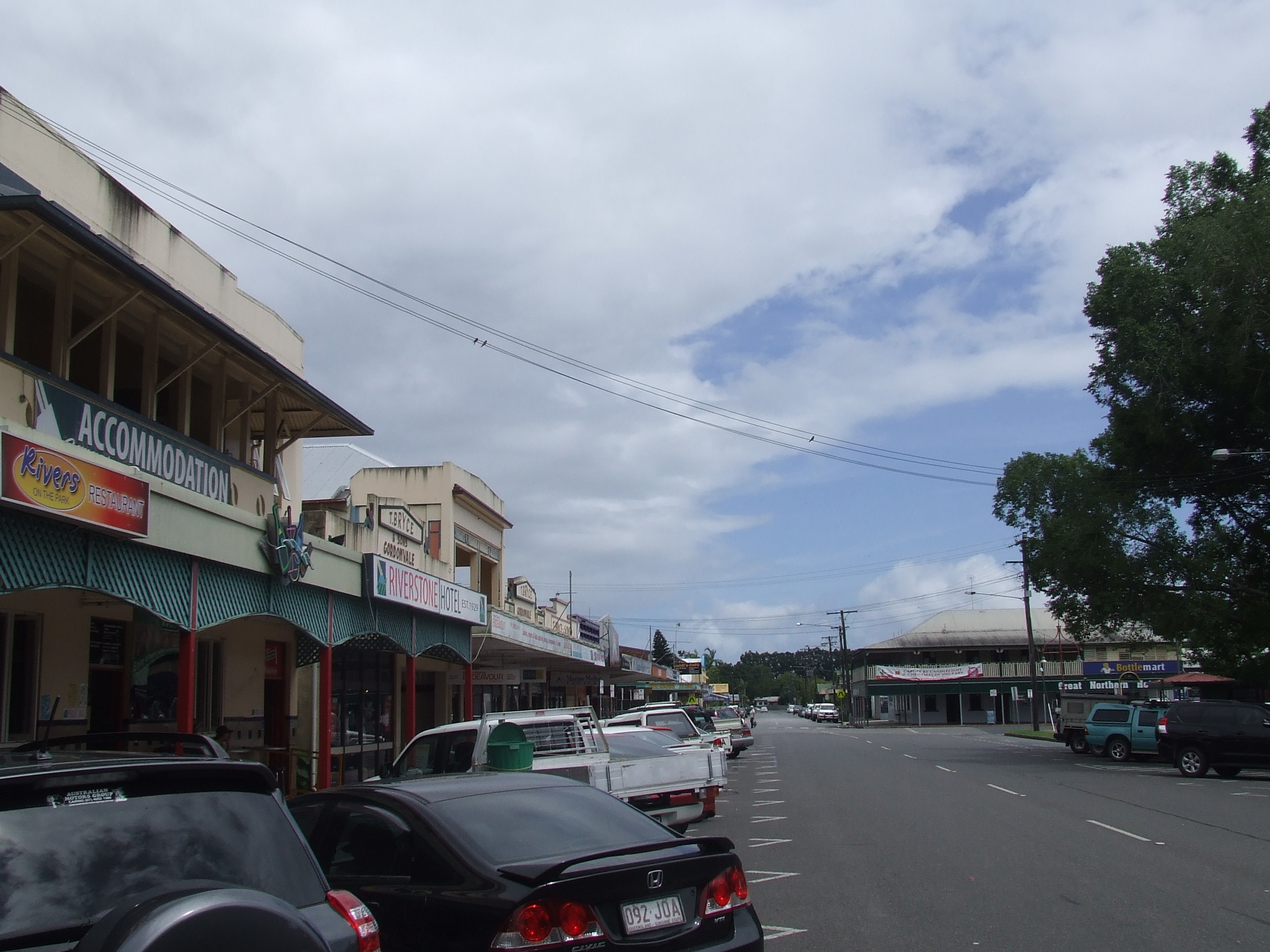
Norman Street, located beside the public park

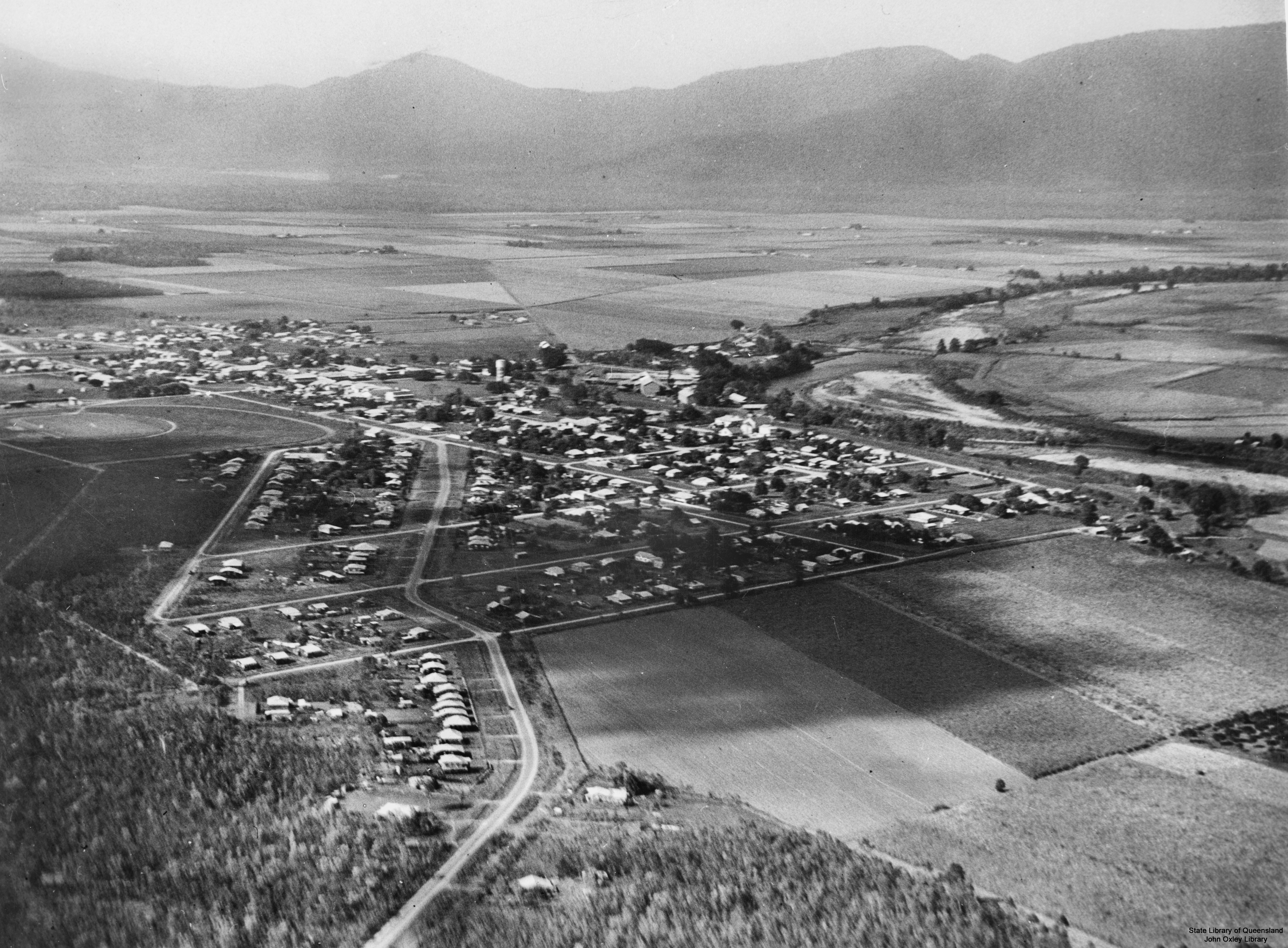
Aerial view of Gordonvale, 1937

Gordonvale was established on Yidinji tribal land. Yidinji (also known as Yidinj, Yidiny, and Idindji) is an Australian Aboriginal language. Its traditional language region is within the local government areas of Cairns Region and Tablelands Region, in such localities as Cairns, Gordonvale, and the Mulgrave River, and the southern part of the Atherton Tableland including Atherton and Kairi.

British settlement began in 1877 with William Saunders Alley and Mr Blackwell and their families who cut a road through to Trinity Inlet so they could haul out cedar logs. It was called Plain Camp by Alley.

In the Cairns area, a Chinese businessman, Andrew Leon, built the first sugar mill in 1882, named Pioneer Mill, and established the Hap Wah Plantation on 612 acres (2.48 km^{2}) of land.

In 1890, the area became known as Mulgrave after the Mulgrave River. In 1896 it was named Nelson, named after Queensland Premier Sir Hugh Muir Nelson. However this caused postal confusion with Nelson in New South Wales. On 24 January 1914, the town was officially renamed Gordonvale after John Gordon, a pioneer in the district who was a butcher, dairyman and grazier, and early director of Mulgrave Central sugar mill.

Mulgrave State School opened on 15 March 1897. In 1914, it was renamed Gordonvale State School. On 28 March 1924, it became Gordonvale Rural School. In 1963, a secondary school department was added until a separate secondary school was established in 1965. On 1 January 1965, the primary school was renamed back to Gordonvale State School.

On 20 April 1916, the Cane Beetles March commenced at Mooliba (now Mirriwinni). It was a snowball march to recruit men into the First Australian Imperial Force during World War I at a time when enthusiasm to enlist had waned after the loss of life in the Gallipoli campaign. The march began at Mooliba with 4 men, passing through Babinda, Aloomba, Gordonvale, and Edmonton, and ending in Cairns 60 kilometres later with 29 recruits.

St Alphonsus Catholic School was established in Muir Street in 1923 by the Sisters of Mercy. It was officially opened on Sunday 15 April 1923 by Bishop John Heavey. A special excursion train was provided for people wishing to attend the ceremony. In December 1959 it was replaced by the St Michael's Catholic Primary School and the former school building became a parish hall. The Sisters of Mercy ended their involvement with the school in 1990 and it now operates under lay leadership.

Little Mulgrave State School opened on 26 July 1926 and closed on 21 February 1964.

On Sunday 15 July 1934, the Apostolic Delegate, Archbishop Filippo Bernardini laid the foundation stone for a new Catholic Church. On Sunday 27 January 1935 Bishop John Heavey officially opened and blessed the new church. The Gordonvale parish of the Roman Catholic Vicariate Apostolic of Cooktown (now the Roman Catholic Diocese of Cairns) was established in 1935.

Cane toads (Bufo marinus) were deliberately introduced into Australia in an attempt to control the native Frenchi beetle (Lepidiota frenchi) and the greyback cane beetle (Dermolepida albohirtum) whose larvae (colloquially known as "cane grubs") were destroying sugar cane crops in North Queensland. In June 1935 the Queensland Bureau of Sugar Experiment Stations imported 102 cane toads (Bufo marinus) into Gordonvale from Hawaii in June 1935 (with one dying in transit due to dehydration) in the belief that the toads would eat the cane beetles, a pest in the sugarcane industry. By March 1937 some 62,000 toadlets had been bred and distributed into sugar cane fields up and down the Queensland coast. The experiment did not work and the toads have spread throughout much of Australia.

During World War II, a contingent of approximately 3,000 American paratroopers was stationed in Gordonvale and did their training there for their missions in New Guinea. The American Army commandeered some of the town's hotels to use as hospitals as many troops were injured during this training. Quite a number of local women were employed to do parachute packing.

The first Gordonvale Fire Station opened in 1950 at 105 Norman Street (17.0943°S 145.7863°E). The new Gordonvale Fire Station on Gillies Range Road was completed in 2017. The new site was chosen to provide better access to both the Bruce Highway and the Gillies Highway.

The Gordonvale Library opened on 19 February 1954, replacing the old School of Arts which was built in 1900.

All Saints' Anglican Church was consecrated on 14 June 1963 by Anglican Bishop of North Queensland Ian Shevill and Anglican Archbishop of Sydney Hugh Gough. It was designed by Cairns architects Sidney George Barnes and Edwin Oribin.

On 26 October 1964, police officer Senior Constable Desmond Trannore was shot attending a domestic disturbance.

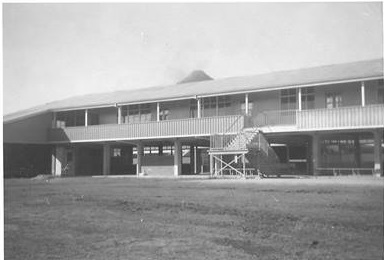
Gordonvale State High School, 1965

Gordonvale State High School opened in 1965, replacing the secondary department of Gordonvale Rural School (also known as Gordonvale State School).

In the 1990s, a number of mosaics were commissioned by the "Friends of Gordonvale" commemorating through imagery the original businesses and shops in the town. These mosaics were cemented permanently within the footpaths directly outside the original sites of the businesses.

Gordonvale was located within the Shire of Mulgrave until its amalgamation with the City of Cairns in 1995. The city was subsequently merged into the larger Cairns Region in 2008.

Emmanuel College opened in Manunda on 29 January 1986. In 2002, Emmanuel College closed and became Djarragun College in Gordonvale, a school committed to improving the educational outcomes of Indigenous students in the Cape York Peninsula area.

In 2012, the new Gordonvale Ambulance Station opened. It replaced the old ambulance station built in 1916 at 1 Cannon Street (17.0933°S 145.7873°E). The old ambulance building was sold on 8 October 2013 for $405,000.

On 27 October 2014, the Cairns Seventh Day Adventist School moved to purpose-built premises in Gordonvale and was renamed Cairns Adventist College. It originally opened as a primary school on 6 February 1950 in the Cairns CBD. It later moved to premises at the Cairns Seventh Day Adventist Church at 302 Gatton Street, Manunda.

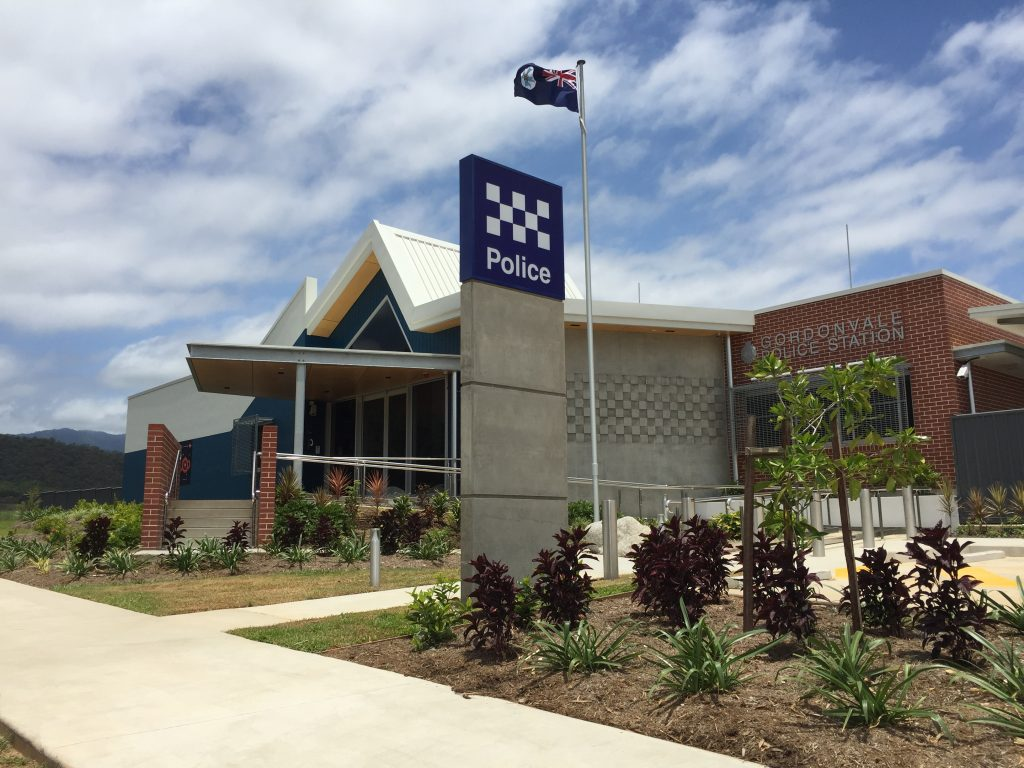
Gordonvale Police Station at its opening, 2018

On 22 November 2018 the new Gordonvale Police Station was officially opened on Draper Road by Police Minister Mark Ryan and Police Commissioner Ian Stewart. The new police station cost $4.5 million and was built to serve the growing population in the corridor south of Cairns. It features Indigenous artwork "Looking to the Stars" by Gilimbaa artist Jenna Lee of the Larrakia people. The previous police station was in Cannon Street (17.0933°S 145.7866°E).

== Demographics ==
In the 2006 census, Gordonvale had a population of 4,420 people.

In the 2011 census, Gordonvale had a population of 6,214 people.

In the 2016 census, Gordonvale had a population of 6,671 people.

In the 2021 census, Gordonvale had a population of 6,944 people.

== Heritage listings ==
Gordonvale has a number of heritage-listed sites, including:

- Meringa Sugar Experiment Station, 71378 Bruce Highway
- Alley Family Graves, Gillies Highway

== Education ==
Gordonvale State School is a government primary (Prep–6) school for boys and girls at 28 George Street (17.0900°S 145.7850°E), opened originally in 1897, under the name Mulgrave State School. In 2018, the school had an enrolment of 553 students with 42 teachers (36 full-time equivalent) and 34 non-teaching staff (20 full-time equivalent). It includes a special education program.

St Michael's Catholic Primary School is a Catholic primary (Prep–6) school for boys and girls at 58 Mill Street (17.0955°S 145.7873°E). In 2018, the school had an enrolment of 307 students with 25 teachers (21 full-time equivalent) and 16 non-teaching staff (11 full-time equivalent).

Cairns Adventist College is a private primary (Prep–6) school for boys and girls at 42 Crossland Road (17.0760°S 145.7923°E). In 2018, the school had an enrolment of 73 students with 6 teachers and 6 non-teaching staff (4 full-time equivalent).

Djarragun College is a private primary and secondary (Prep–12) day and boarding school for predominantly Aboriginal and Torres Strait Islander boys and girls at 1 Maher Road (17.0799°S 145.7763°E). Opened in 2001, in 2018, the school had an enrolment of 308 students with 25 teachers and 47 non-teaching staff (41 full-time equivalent). About 25% of the students are boarders coming from the Torres Strait Islands, Cape York Peninsula, and remote areas in Queensland and the Northern Territory. The school's mission is "to develop proud, strong, educated Indigenous men and women, who walk confidently in two worlds, to be leaders, and to be role models for their families and communities".

Gordonvale State High School is a government secondary (7–12) school for boys and girls at 85 Sheppards Street (17.0887°S 145.7783°E). In 2018, the school had an enrolment of 793 students with 73 teachers (69 full-time equivalent) and 40 non-teaching staff (30 full-time equivalent). It includes a special education program. When it opened, it replaced the secondary department of Gordonvale State School.

== Amenities ==
The Gordonvale Library at 88 Norman Street (17.0931°S 145.7860°E) is operated by the Cairns Regional Council.

Gordonvale Community Hall is at 17–19 Cannon Street (17.09311°S 145.78574°E). It is capable of seating up to 80 people and is operated by the Cairns Regional Council.

St Michael's Catholic Church is at 64 Mill Street (17.0959°S 145.7872°E). It is within the Gordonvale Parish of the Roman Catholic Diocese of Cairns.

Gordonvale Uniting Church (also known as Eternal Life Fellowship) is at 72–74 Gordon Street (17.09146°S 145.7877°E). It is within the Carpentaria Presbytery of the Uniting Church in Australia.

All Saints' Anglican Church is at 5–7 Church Street (17.0948°S 145.7872°E).

Gordonvale Presbyterian Church is at 9 Norman Street (17.0893°S 145.7869°E). It is a charge (including Babinda Presbyterian Church) of the Presbyterian Church of Queensland.

Gordonvale QCWA Hall is at 92 Norman Street (17.0934°S 145.7860°E). Although the QCWA branch is no longer active, the hall continues to be used for community purposes.

The Gordonvale Aquatic Centre is at 73–77 Sheppards Street (17.0892°S 145.7805°E). It has a swimming pool and associated services.

== Media ==
The Mulgrave News, "Letting the local people know." is the local independent monthly suburban. It covers local news, real estate, classifieds and more. Pyramid Views also runs in Gordonvale, delivering local news, advertisements for local businesses, real estate listings and public interest stories.

== Sport ==
Pyramid Power AFL Club competed in the AFL Cairns competition. The Power had sides in the Under 8 through to Under 18, as well as a Senior Women's side. The home ground for Pyramid Power was at Power Park on Maher Road.

== Attractions ==
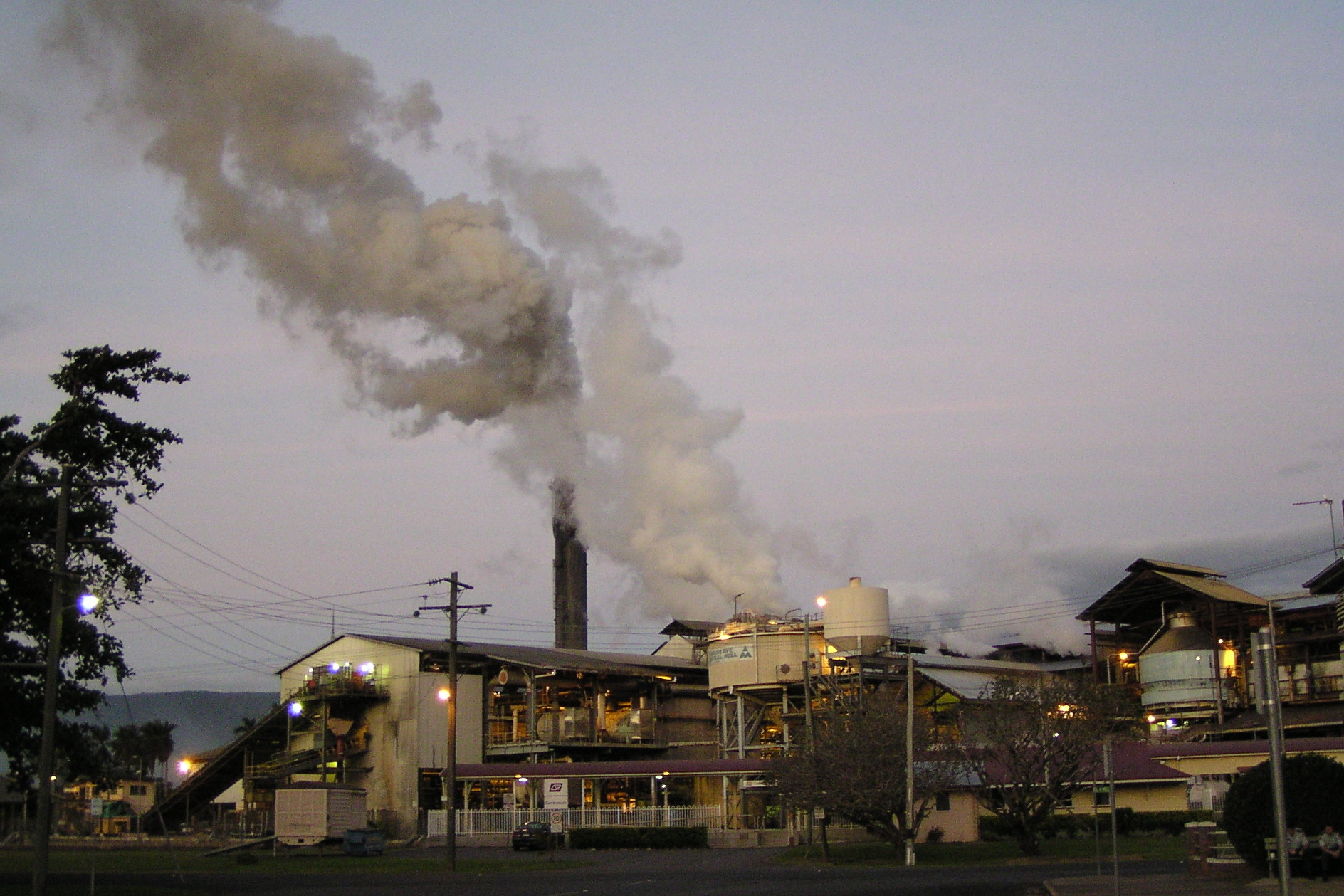
Mulgrave Central Mill at dusk

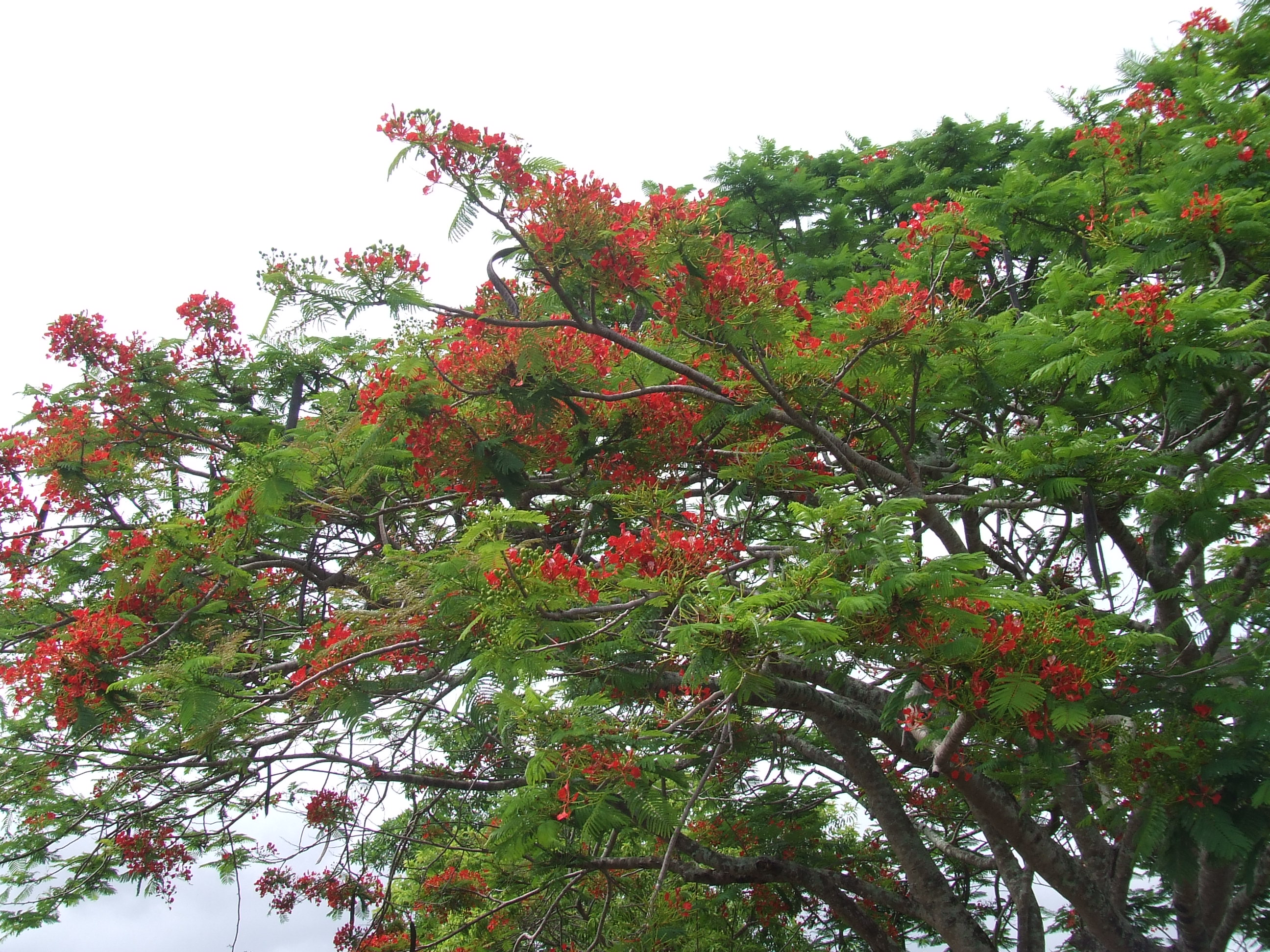
Delonix regia, the Royal Poinciana tree in flower, Church Street, Gordonvale, Queensland. Seed pods visible on upper branches.

Operating since 1896, the Mulgrave Sugar Mill is located near the town centre in Gordon St. The mill services about 300 sugarcane farms in the local region and operates during the 'crush' season (about six months of the year).

The Mulgrave Settlers Museum is across Gordon Street from the mill. It is operated by the Mulgrave Shire Historical Society. The museum has a number of historical items donated from the local community and displays that represent the early gold miners, cedar cutters, Chinese workers and packers (mule train suppliers to the Atherton Tableland). The museum is open Monday to Saturday from 10AM to 2PM.

The suburb is surrounded predominantly by sugarcane fields and is only a short drive from many places including the Bellenden Ker National Park and Goldsborough Valley State Forest.

== Notable residents ==
- Brianna Coop, Australian Paralympic sprinter
- Brian Johns, company director and journalist
- Nate Myles, Australia and Queensland rugby league player
- Curtis Pitt, politician
- Adam Sarota, footballer

== See also ==
- Gordonvale railway station
- List of tramways in Queensland
