= Gillies Range =

Mountain range in Queensland, Australia

Gillies
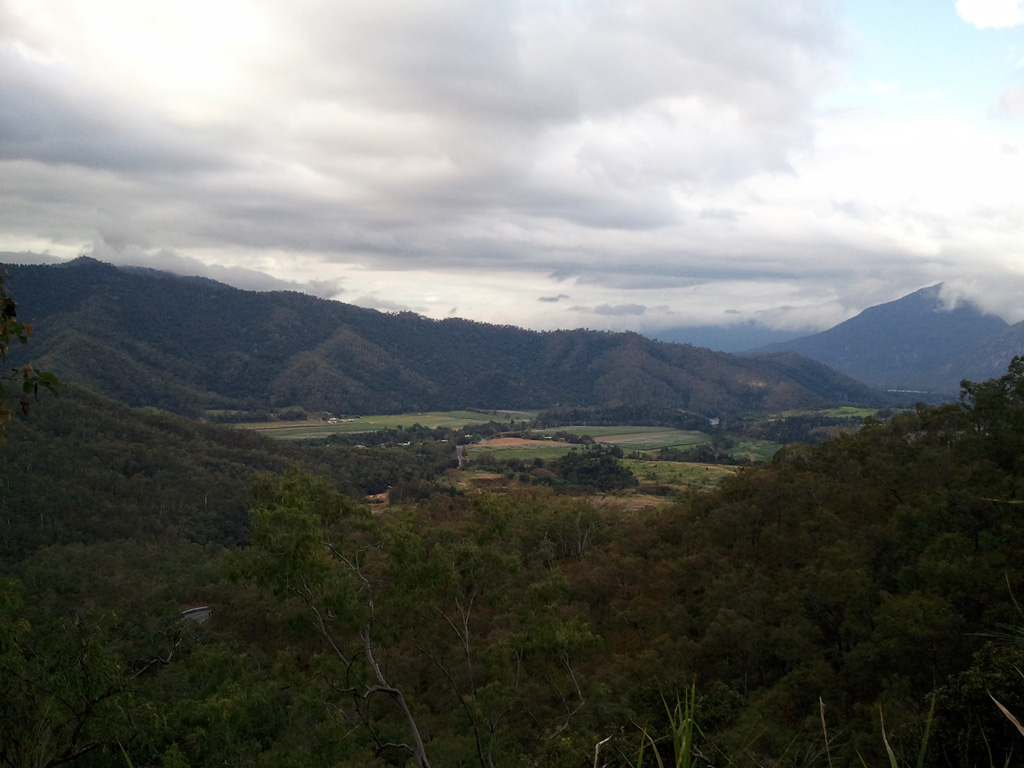
- View from the Eastern side of the Gillies Range

Geography
- Country: Australia
- State: Queensland
- Region: Far North Queensland
- Range coordinates: 17°9.1′S 145°42.1′E

The Gillies Range is a mountain range in Queensland, Australia. It is a chain of summits south of Cairns that separate the Far North Queensland coastal plain from the interior Atherton Tableland. At the foot of the range is the town of Gordonvale.

The Gillies Highway permits road access from the Goldsborough Valley near Gordonvale, to Atherton on the Atherton Tableland via the Gillies Range (famous for its 263 corners, and 800 m elevation change in only 19 km of road). The Gillies Highway and range were named after William N Gillies, a former Premier of Queensland.

== See also ==
- List of mountains in Australia
