= Mulgrave Sugar Mill =

Coordinates: 17.0929°S 145.7889°E

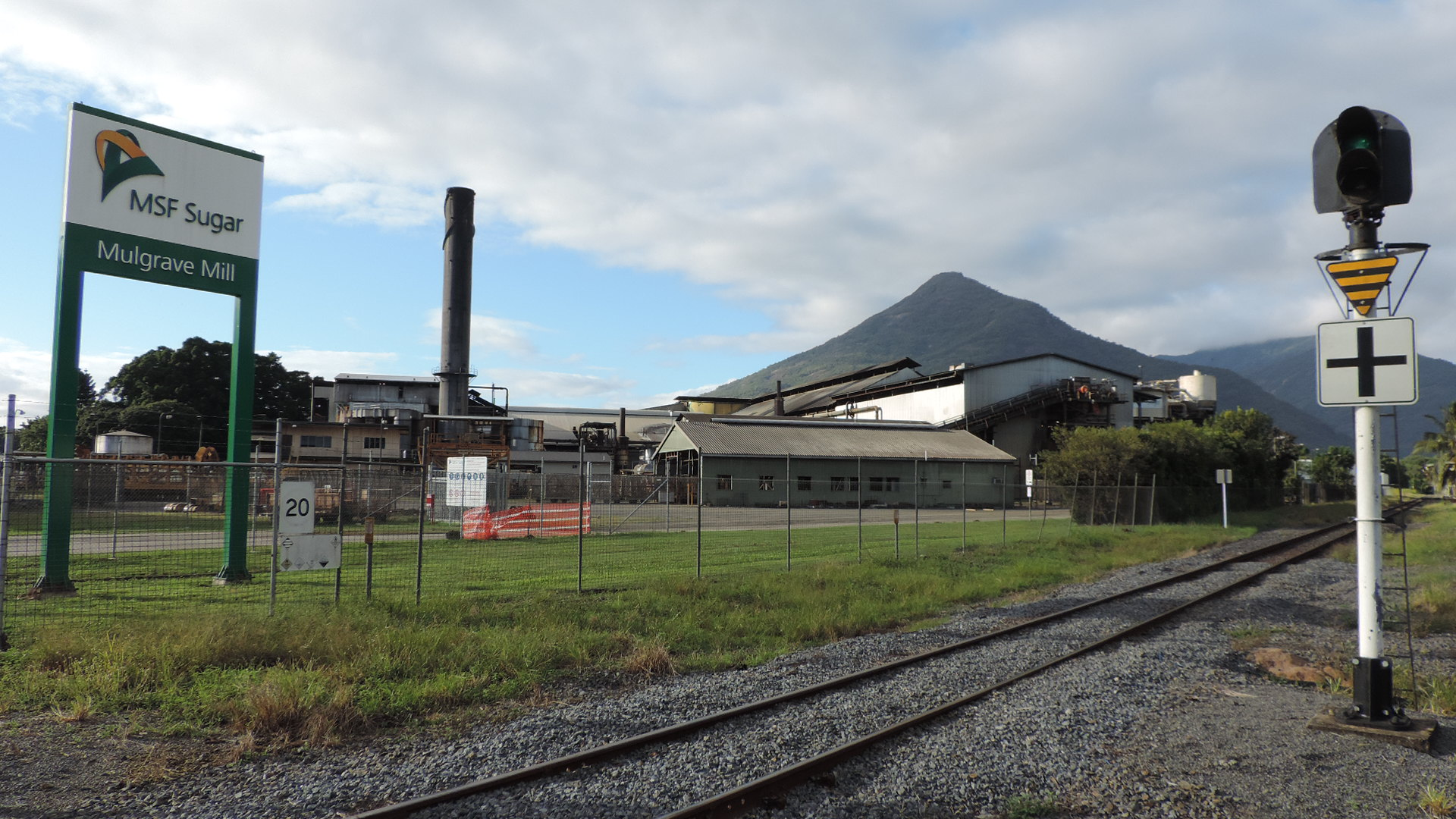
Mulgrave Sugar Mill, Gordonvale, 2018

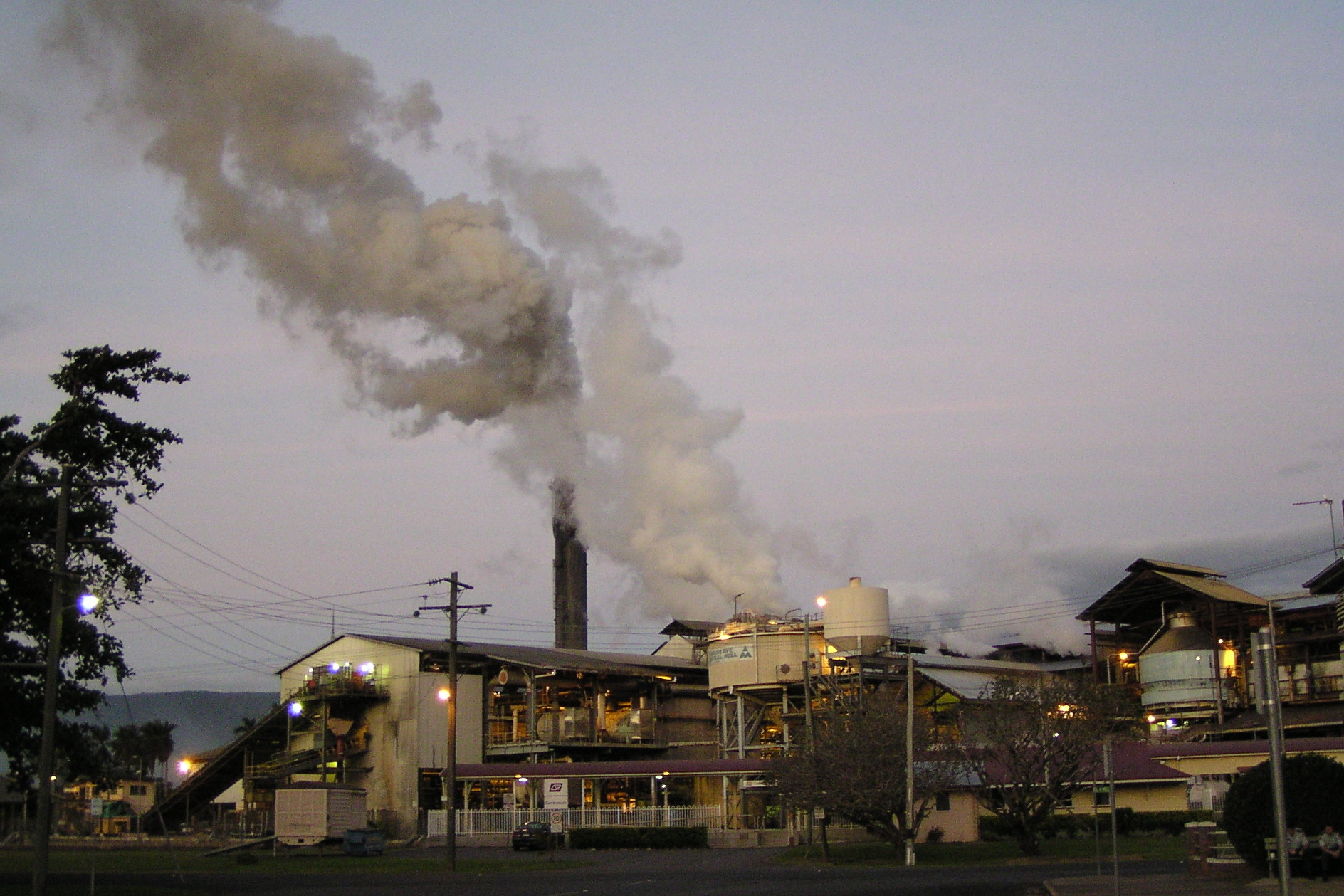
Mulgrave Sugar Mill, 2006

The Mulgrave Sugar Mill is a sugar mill in Gordonvale, Cairns Region, Queensland, Australia. It commenced operations in 1896. It is operated by MSF Sugar, a subsidiary of the Mitr Phol Group. It is also known as Mulgrave Central Mill.

== History ==
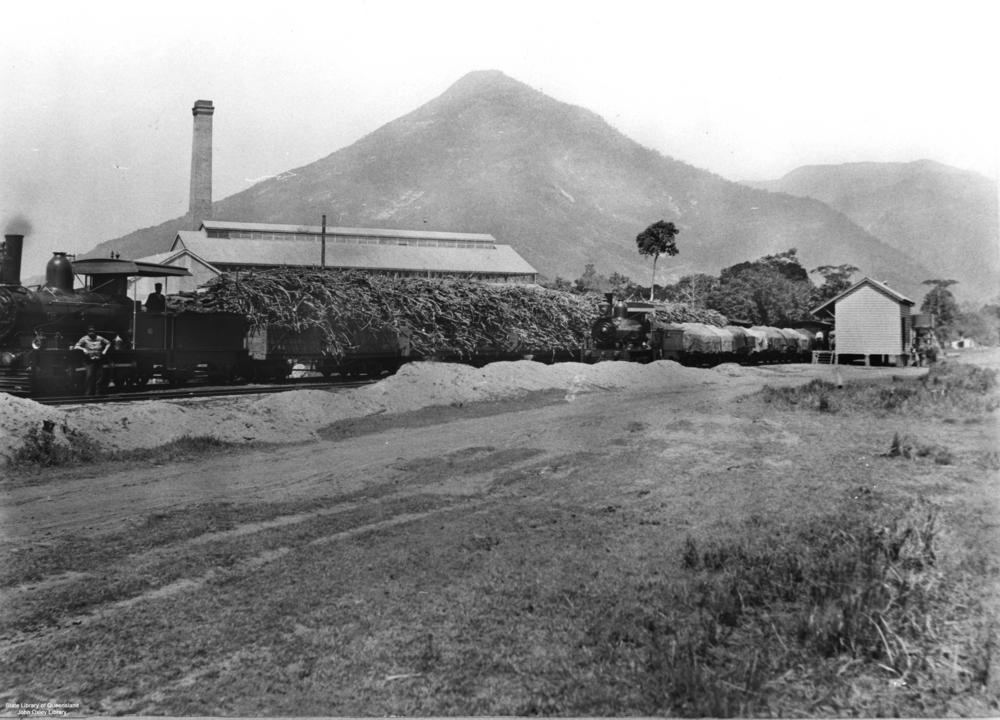
Cane train at the Mulgrave Sugar Mill, Gordonvale, 1902

Richard Blackwell was a pioneer settler in the Gordonvale area. On 18 October 1879, took up land in the Mulgrave River area known as Plain Camp, near where Gordonvale is now located. He reportedly made a gift of part of this land for the establishment of the Mulgrave Sugar Mill. The Sugar Works Guarantee Act of 1893 provided for the erection of approved Central Mills on a government loan if farmers mortgaged their land as security. After the principal and interest had been met, these Central Mills were to be handed to the growers as Cooperative Mills. The Mulgrave settler's organisation evolved from a meeting held at Tom Mackey's farm, at which Richard Blackwell was in attendance. A provisional directorate was formed with Mackey as Chairman. The original memorandum of the Association of the Mulgrave Central Mill Co Ltd dated 14 November 1893, was registered in Brisbane 20 April 1895. Signatories to this included Richard Blackwell. The nominal capital of £40,000 was increased to £60,000 in 1896. The Mulgrave Central Mill enterprise proceeded rapidly, and Richard Blackwell was one of the first directors of the Mulgrave Mill.

== Locomotives ==
The Mill uses locomotives built in the 1950s and 1960s. Locomotive types include:

- 0-6-0DM Com-Eng
- 0-6-0DH Com-Eng
- 0-6-0DH Clyde
- 4wDM EMB
- B-B DH Walkers BFE

== See also ==
- List of sugar mills in Queensland
- Cairns-Mulgrave Tramway
- List of tramways in Queensland
