= Gordonvale railway station =

Railway station in Queensland, Australia

Gordonvale
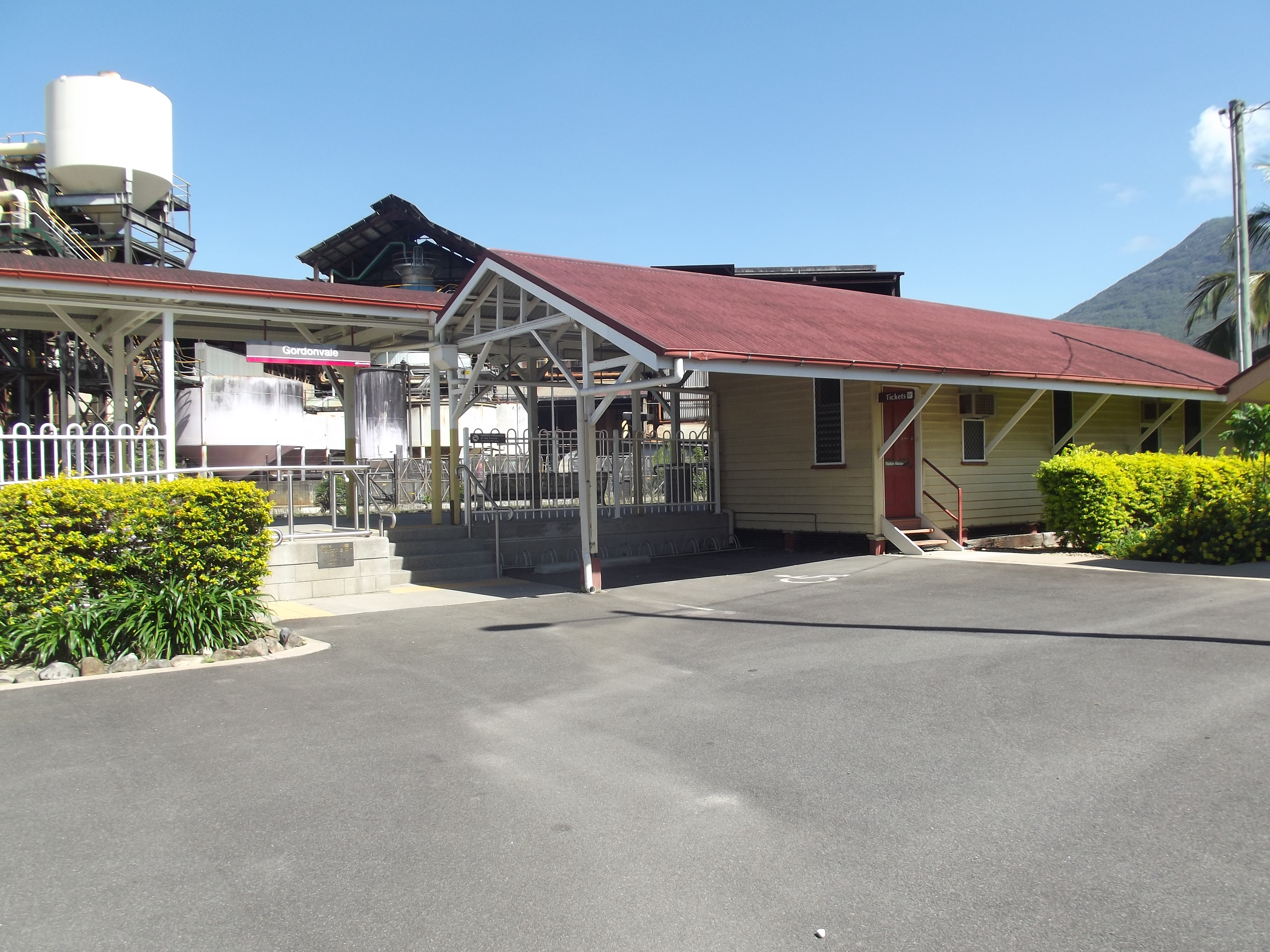
- Station front in January 2013

General information
- Location: Mill Street, Gordonvale
- Coordinates: 17.0932°S 145.7879°E
- Owner: Queensland Rail
- Operator: Traveltrain
- Line: North Coast
- Distance: 1657.60 kilometres from Central
- Platforms: 1
- Tracks: 2

Construction
- Structure type: Ground
- Accessible: Yes

Services
Preceding station	Queensland Rail	Following station
Babinda towards Brisbane	Spirit of Queensland	Cairns Terminus
Location

Gordonvale railway station is located on the North Coast line in Queensland, Australia. It serves the town of Gordonvale. The station has one platform. Opposite the platform lies a passing loop and a large sugar mill.

== Services ==
Gordonvale is served by Traveltrain's Spirit of Queensland service.
