= Babinda railway station =

Railway station in Queensland, Australia

Babinda
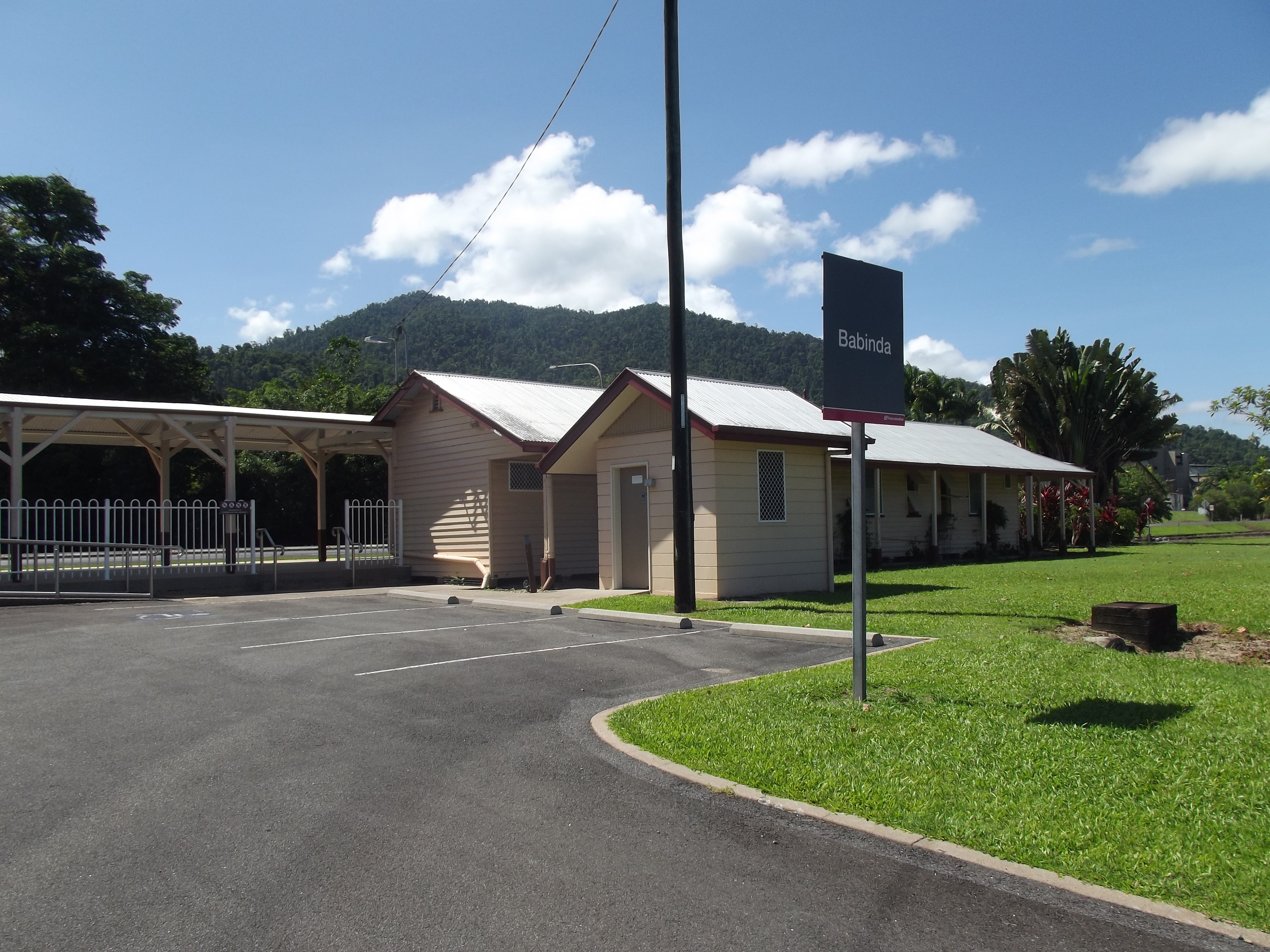
- Station front in January 2013

General information
- Location: Howard Kennedy Drive, Babinda
- Coordinates: 17.3432°S 145.9254°E
- Owner: Queensland Rail
- Operator: Traveltrain
- Line: North Coast
- Distance: 1621.54 kilometres from Central
- Platforms: 1

Construction
- Structure type: Ground
- Accessible: Yes

Services
Preceding station	Queensland Rail	Following station
Innisfail towards Brisbane	Spirit of Queensland	Gordonvale towards Cairns
Location

Babinda railway station is located on the North Coast line in Queensland, Australia. It serves the town of Babinda. The station has one platform, toilets, and shelter.

== Services ==
Babinda is served by Traveltrain's Spirit of Queensland service.
