= Gillies Highway =

Highway in Queensland, Australia

Gillies Highway Gillies Range Road Queensland
- Gillies Range Road (black and green)

General information
- Type: Highway
- Length: 56 km (35 mi)
- Route number(s): State Route 52

Major junctions
- NE end: Bruce Highway, (State Route A1), Gordonvale, Queensland
- Malanda–Lake Barrine Road; Tinaroo Falls Dam Road
- SW end: Kennedy Highway, (National Route 1), Atherton, Queensland

Location(s)
- Major settlements: Yungaburra

Highway system
- Highways in Australia; National Highway • Freeways in Australia; Highways in Queensland

The Gillies Highway is a road that runs from Gordonvale in the Cairns Region through the Gillies Range (part of the Great Dividing Range) to Atherton in the Tablelands Region, both in Queensland, Australia. Its official name is Gillies Range Road, and it was originally known as the Cairns Range Road.

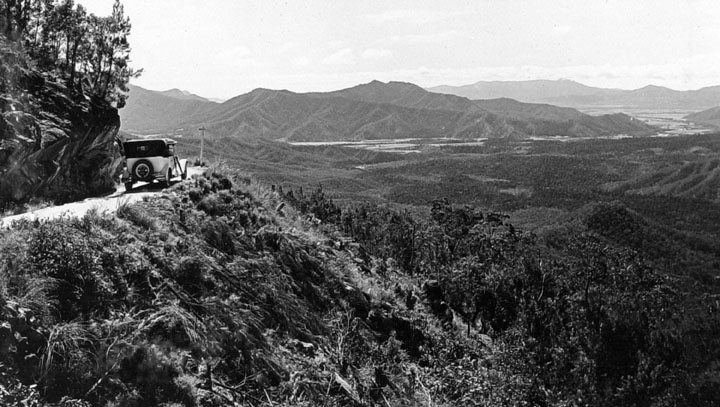
View from Heales Lookout at 2,000 feet (610 m) on the Gillies Highway, circa 1935

It is a state-controlled regional road (number 642).

The highway is known for its 263 corners, and 800 m elevation change in only 19 km of road. It is a popular tourist drive and has a number of lookouts.

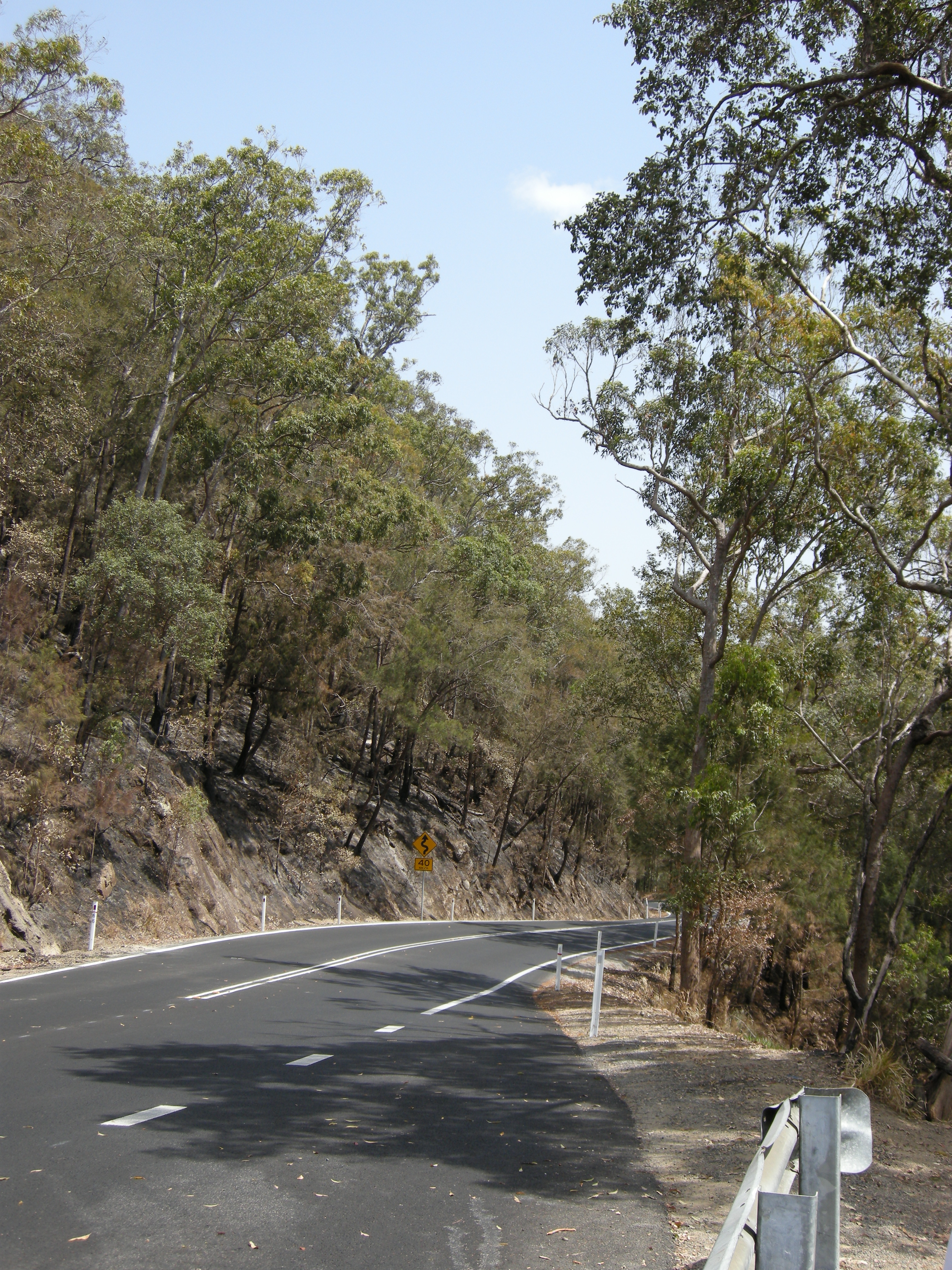
Gillies Highway, 2009

== Route Description ==
Commencing from the Bruce Highway in Gordonvale the road runs south-west, following the Mulgrave River, to the foot of the Gillies Range. It climbs the range by a winding route, generally westward, and then proceeds south through the Little Mulgrave National Park before turning west to ascend to the Atherton Tableland. It then passes north of Lake Barrine and south of Tinaroo Dam before reaching Yungaburra, where it passes the exit to Malanda-Lake Barrine Road to the south-east. From here it proceeds west to Atherton, which it enters from the north, after passing the exit to Tinaroo Falls Dam Road to the north-east.

It also provides the only road access to the locality of Goldsborough.

== History ==
In September 1922, the Shire of Eacham decided to use £10,000 of funding provided under Australian and Queensland Government unemployment schemes to construct the Cairns Range Road to provide a short route from the Atherton Tableland to the Cairns hinterland. There were immediate objections to the proposed route from Gordonvale to Atherton on account of the difficult terrain with a counter-proposal to build a road from Smithfield in Cairns to Mareeba via Kuranda, but this route would be more beneficial to the Shire of Mareeba rather than to the Shire of Eacham, so the original plan proceeded (although the Kuranda Range Road would later be built in 1940).

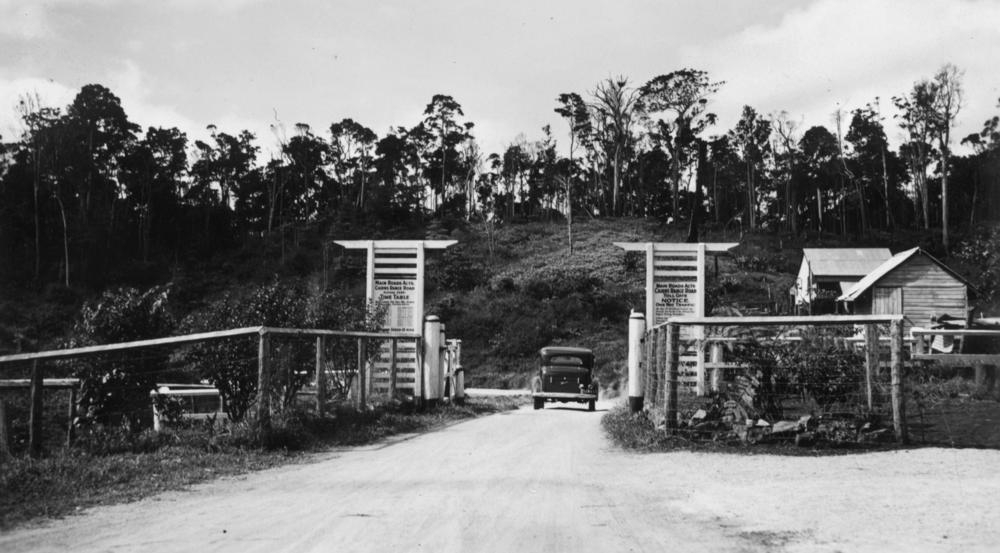
Top gate, circa 1935

By March 1925, 150 men were employed building the road. It was officially opened on Saturday 10 July 1926 allowing travel between Cairns to the Tableland in 2½ hours. However, as the road was only wide enough for one-way traffic, it would flow in different directions at various times of day according to a timetable with vehicles wishing to travel in the other directions being held at Top Gate or Bottom Gate.

The Gillies Highway was named after William Gillies, a former Premier of Queensland and the local Member of the Queensland Legislative Assembly for Eacham. It was proposed to name the Cairns Range Road (as it was then known) after him following his sudden death in February 1928 but it was not made official until March 1934.

On 4 February 1987, a bus carrying Year 12 school students and teachers from the Cairns State High School came off the highway and fell down 20 metres into rainforest, killing 8 students. An inquiry established the brakes of the bus were faulty.

== Upgrades ==
A project to improve safety on sections of the road, at a cost of $19.341 million, was scheduled for completion in December 2022.

== Intersecting state-controlled road ==
The following state-controlled road intersects with Gillies Range Road:

- Tinaroo Falls Dam Road

== Tinaroo Falls Dam Road ==
Tinaroo Falls Dam Road
- Location: Gillies Range Road, Atherton to Danbulla Road, Tinaroo
- Length: 16.4 km (10.2 mi)

Tinaroo Falls Dam Road is a state-controlled district road (number 6425) rated as a local road of regional significance (LRRS). It runs from Gillies Range Road in Atherton, via Kairi, to Danbulla Road in Tinaroo, a distance of 16.4 kilometres (10.2 mi). The only major intersection on this road is with Tolga-Kairi Road in Kairi.

== Major intersections ==
LGA	Location	km	mi	Destinations	Notes
Cairns	Gordonvale	0	0.0	Bruce Highway (State Route A1) – north – Cairns / south–east – Babinda	North–eastern end of Gillies Highway (State Route 52)
Tablelands	Yungaburra	40.1	24.9	Lake Barrine Road – south – Malanda	
Tablelands	Atherton	53.6	33.3	Tinaroo Falls Dam Road – north–east – Tinaroo	
Tablelands	Atherton	56	35	Kennedy Highway (National Route 1) – west, then north – Tolga / – east, then south – Evelyn	South–western end of Gillies Highway. State Route 52 continues south–west as Atherton Herberton Road.
1.000 mi = 1.609 km; 1.000 km = 0.621 mi
