= Babinda Boulders =

Public recreation area within Wooroonooran National Park, Australia

Boulders Scenic Reserve
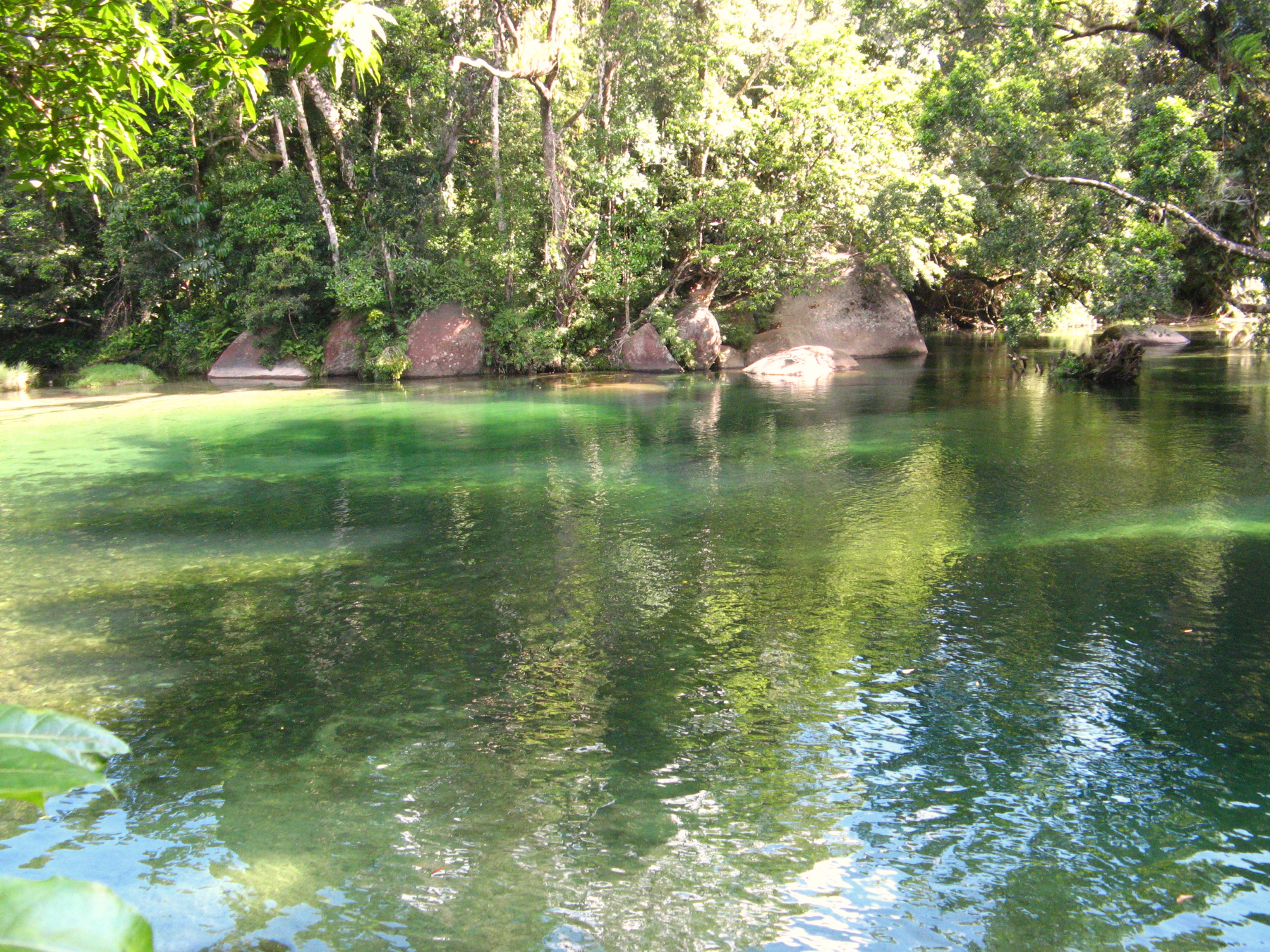
- The main swimming hole at Babinda Boulders

- Location within Queensland
- Location: Queensland
- Nearest city: Babinda
- Coordinates: 17°20′30″S 145°52′10″E
- Governing body: Cairns Regional Council
- Website: https://www.cairns.qld.gov.au/region/things-to-do/babinda-boulders

Babinda Boulders, officially called the Boulders Scenic Reserve but known locally as Babinda Boulders or simply the Boulders, is a public recreation reserve alongside Babinda Creek, managed by the Cairns Regional Council and adjacent to the Wooroonooran National Park in far north Queensland, Australia.

== Description ==
The Boulders Scenic Reserve encompasses a section of Babinda Creek where several smaller tributaries join it. Most of the site, apart from the picnic and play areas adjacent to the main swimming hole, is covered by dense tropical rainforest. It lies in the foothills between Queensland's highest and second-highest mountain peaks – Mount Bartle Frere and Mount Bellenden Ker respectively. This high coastal mountain range, the tropical location and the moist south-easterly trade winds are responsible for making the coastal strip between Tully and Cape Tribulation the wettest area in all of Australia, and as a result a constant supply of cool mountain water flows through all the creeks of the reserve.

== Location ==
Access to the Boulders Scenic Reserve is via the town of Babinda which is about 60 km (37 mi) south of Cairns and about 30 km (19 mi) north of Innisfail on the Bruce Highway. The reserve is located about 6 km (3.7 mi) to the west of the town.

== Facilities ==
The site is well suited for families, boasting spacious and calm swimming holes with clear cool water year round, a picnic area with tables and free gas barbecues, toilets and showers, swings, grassed areas, viewing platforms, and walking tracks. There is also a free camping ground close by.

== Walks ==
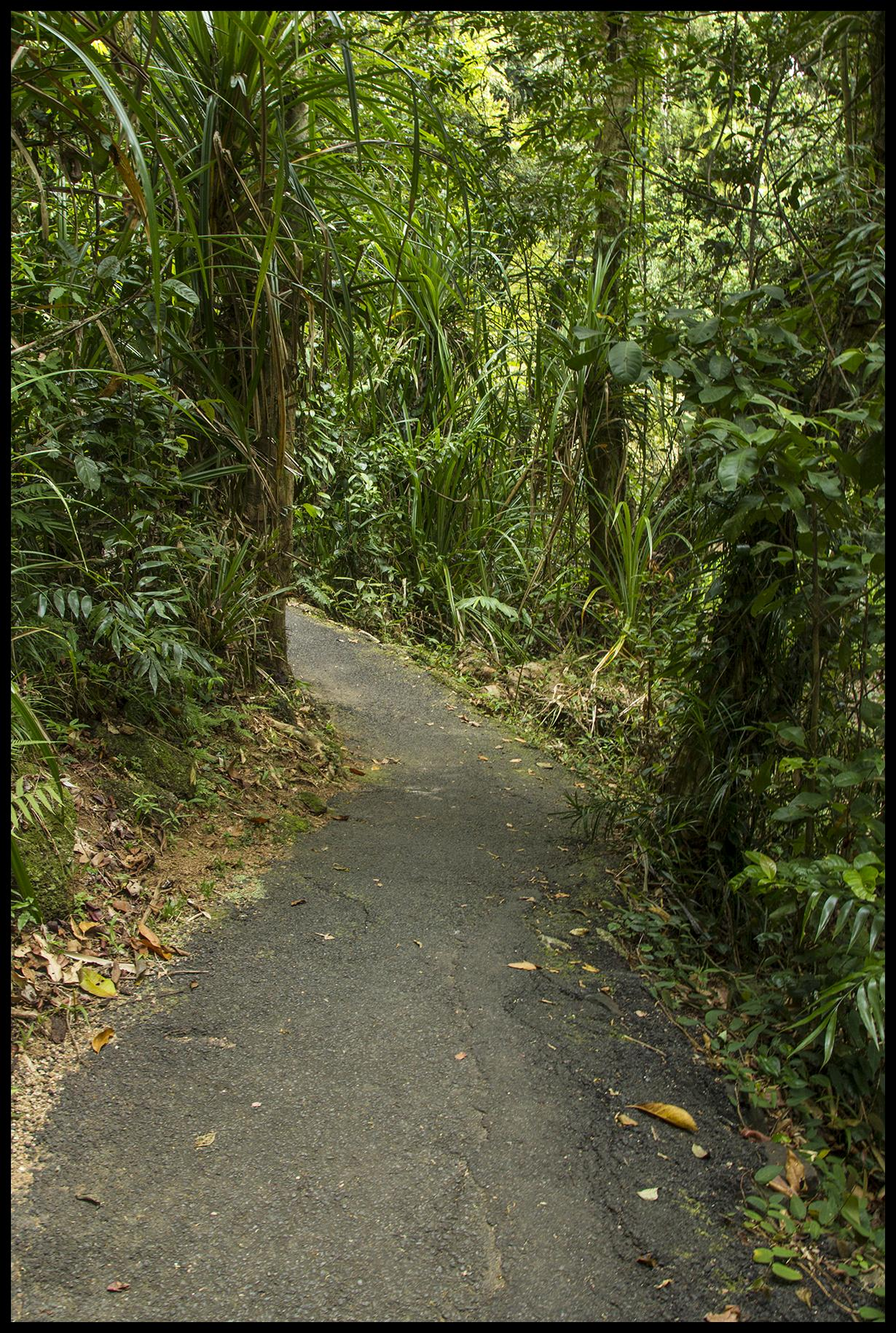
A section of the track to the Devil's Pool

There are three walking tracks within the Boulders Reserve:

- Wonga Circuit Track: an easy 850 m (0.53 mi) loop walk which takes one through rainforest alongside both North Babinda Creek and Babinda Creek.
- Devil's Pool Walk: this 1.2 km (0.75 mi) return walk takes the visitor alongside a lower section of Babinda Creek. There are two viewing platforms where the spectacular and dangerous rock formations may be observed.
- Goldfield Trail: a track for more serious walkers, it begins from the reserve and leads north west approximately 19 km (12 mi) over a saddle in the Bellenden Ker Range to the Goldsborough Valley.

== Indigenous names ==
In the language of the local indigenous Yidinji people the area is called Bunna Binda meaning "waterfall" or "water over your shoulder". The town name "Babinda" is derived from the indigenous one. Wonga is a local indigenous family name. The original Yidinji name for Mt Bartle Frere is Chooreechillum.

== Devil's Pool ==
The Devil's Pool is at the top of a perilous section of Babinda Creek. Approximately 700 m (770 yd) downstream from the main swimming hole, the river valley narrows considerably and the creek channel is filled with massive boulders and lined with bedrock, all of which have been polished smooth by the water flow over millennia. In the dry season, the water in Babinda Creek passes over and under these rocks, sometimes disappearing from view altogether. In the wet season, the boulders are often completely covered.

Regardless of the season, the rocks are slippery when wet, and many casual visitors have slipped into the stream and been dragged by the strong current to their deaths. Others have drowned while attempting to swim in the Devil's Pool. Approximately 20 people have drowned at the pools since 1959. Many victims drown after being wedged in an underwater rock "chute". The force of the moving water is too strong for people to swim against, pinning them underwater, and drowning them.

== Gallery ==
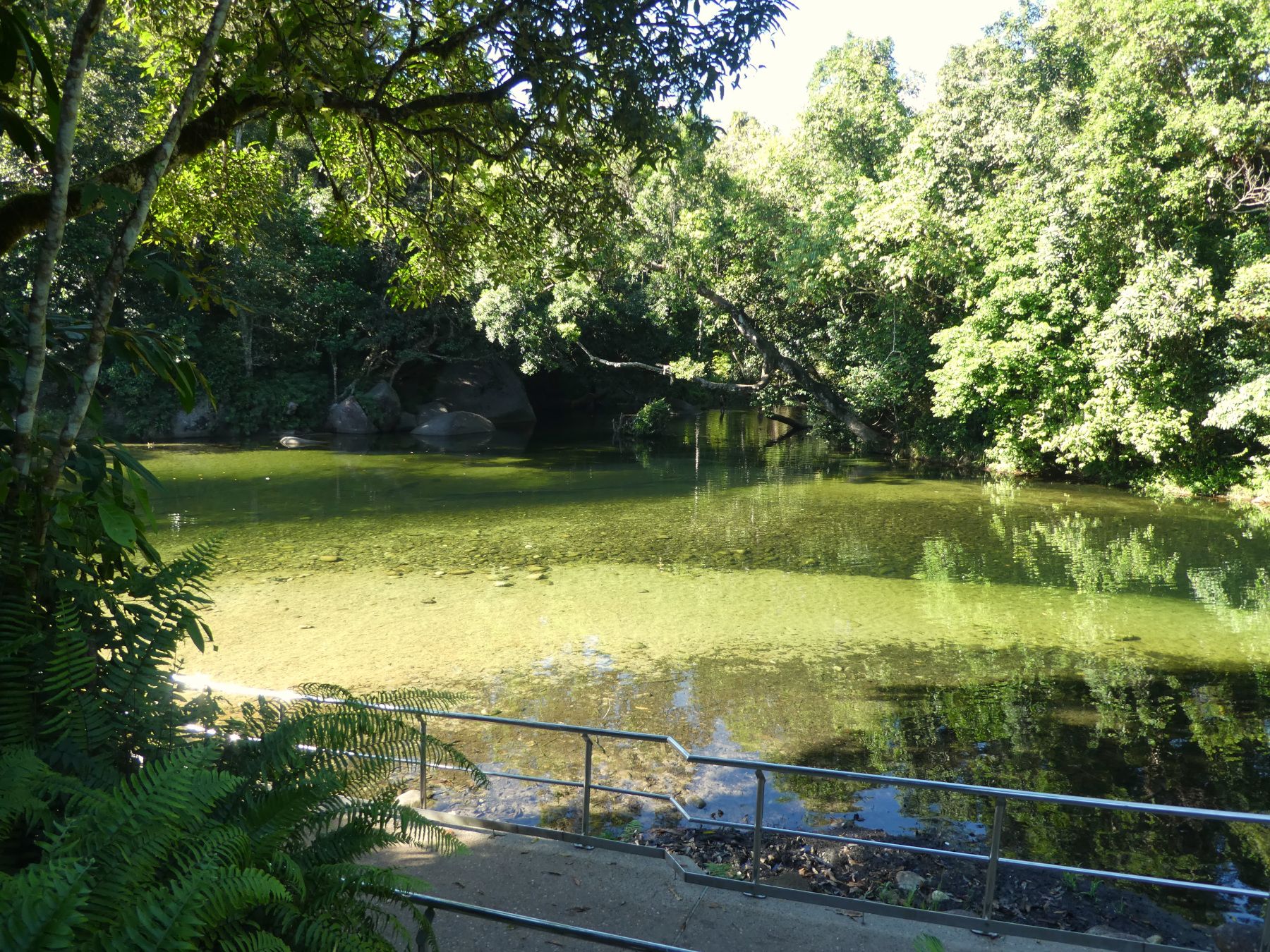
The main swimming hole at the Boulders Scenic Reserve, Babinda, Queensland

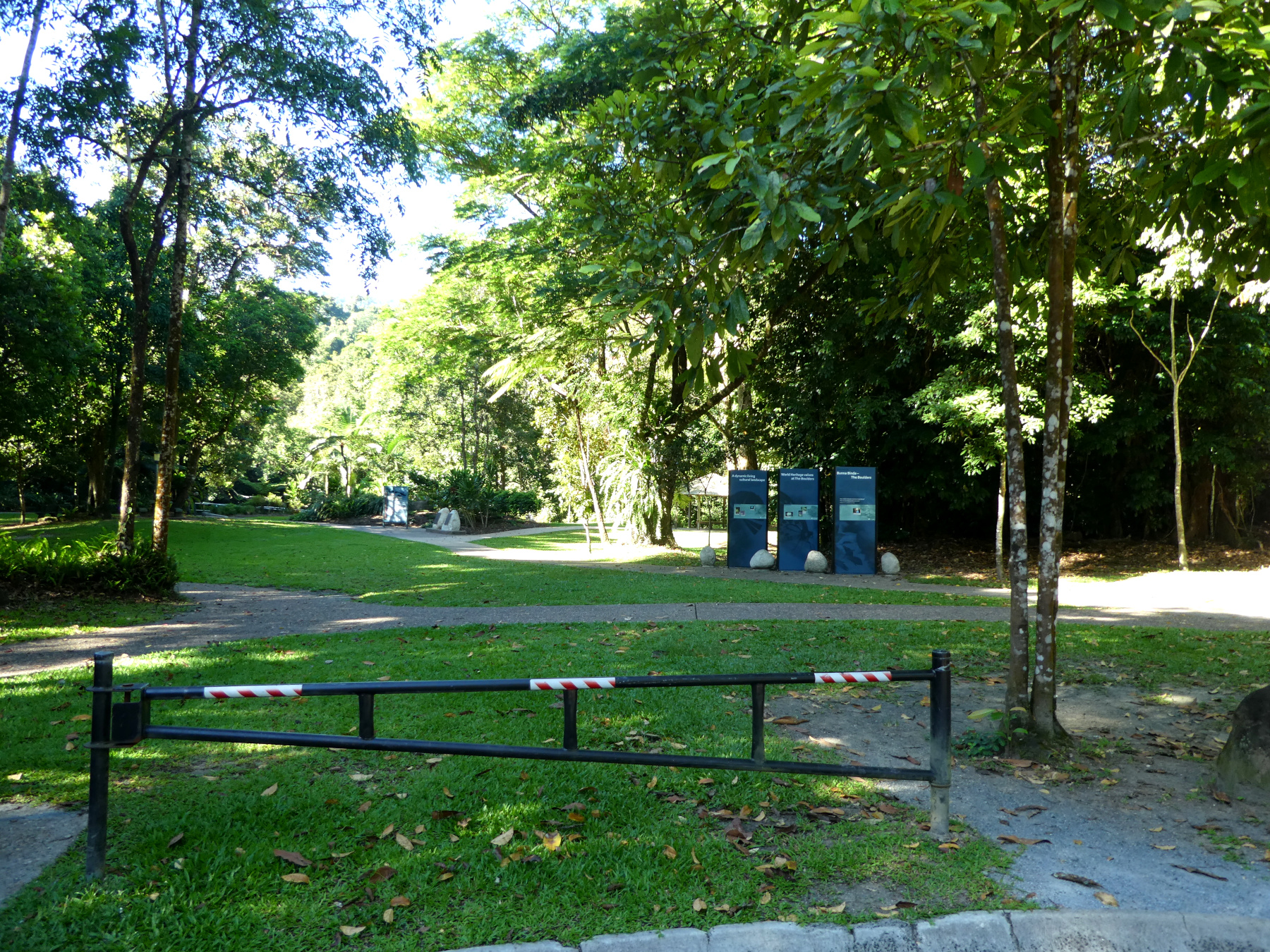
Babinda boulders picnic area

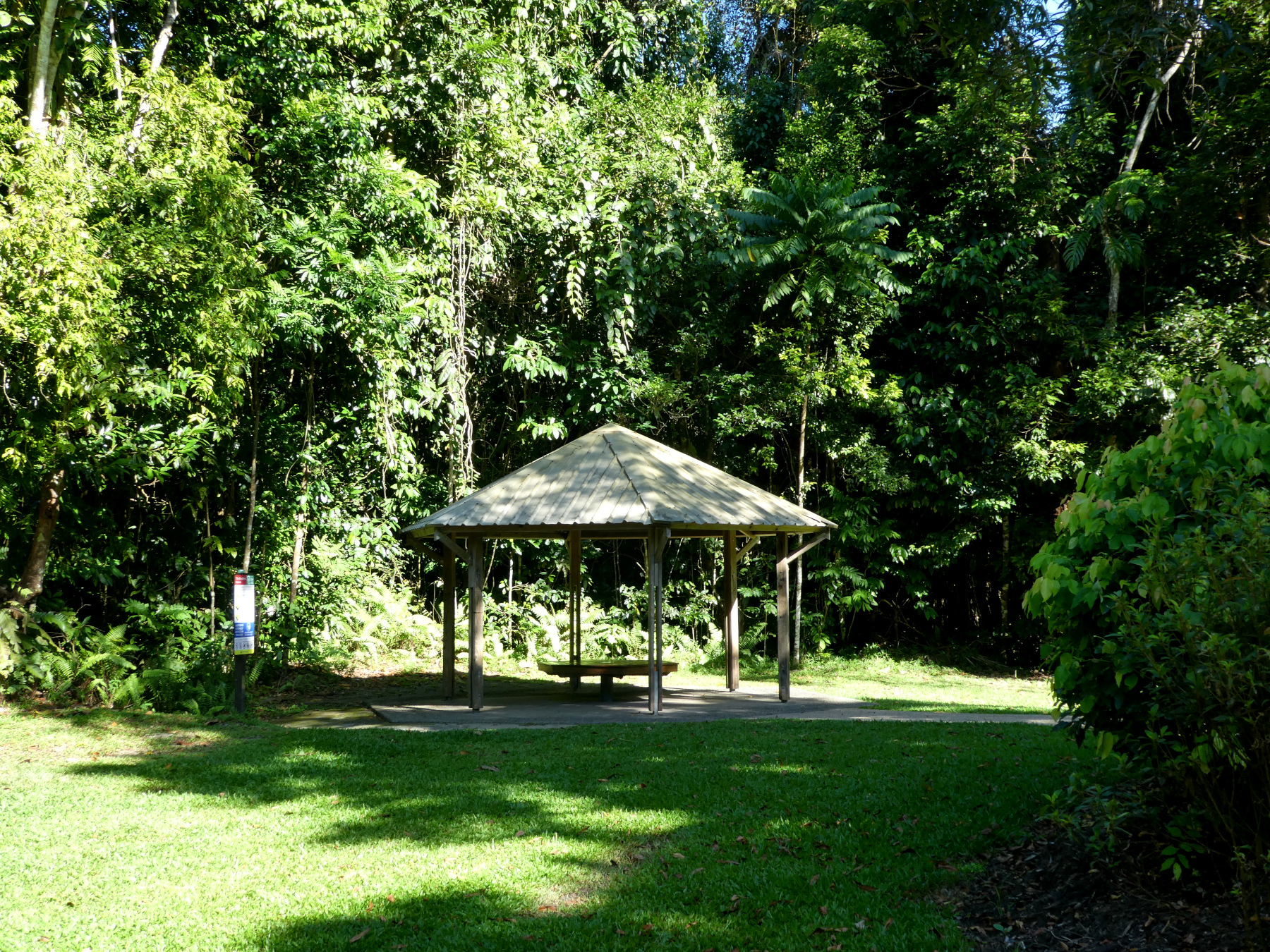
A picnic shelter at Babinda Boulders

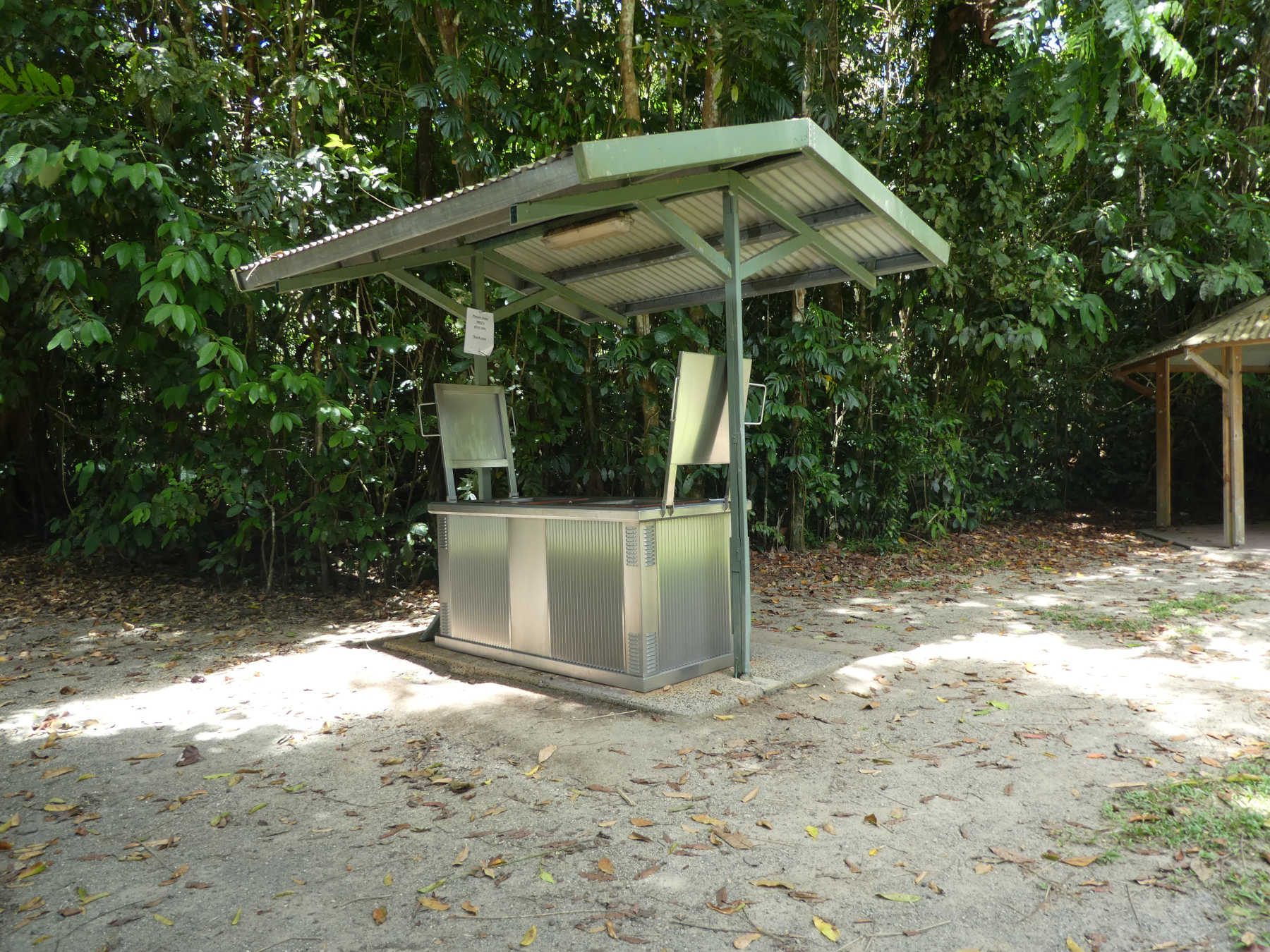
One of the public barbeques at Babinda Boulders Scenic Reserve

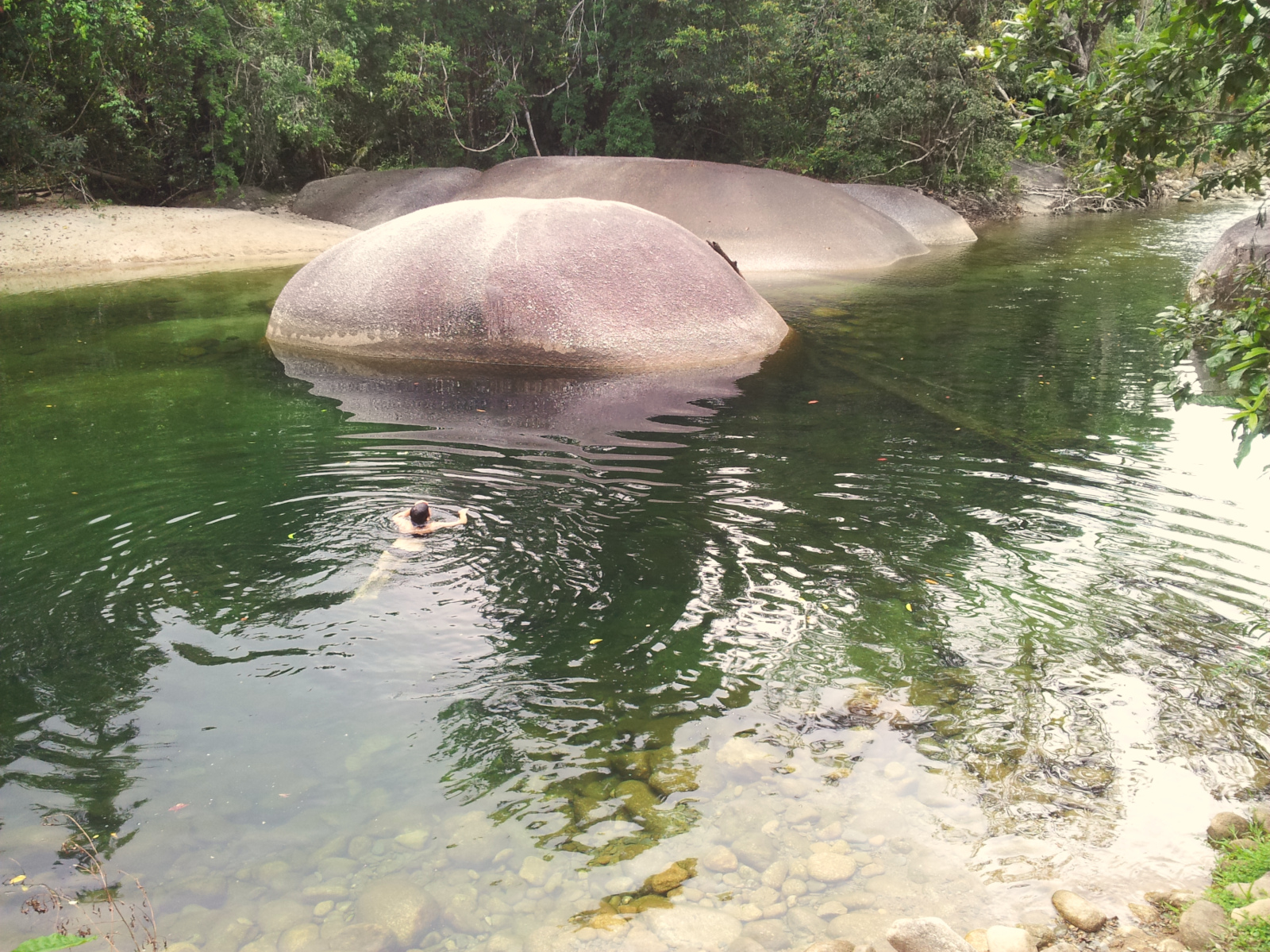
Swimming in Babinda Creek, upstream from the main recreation area

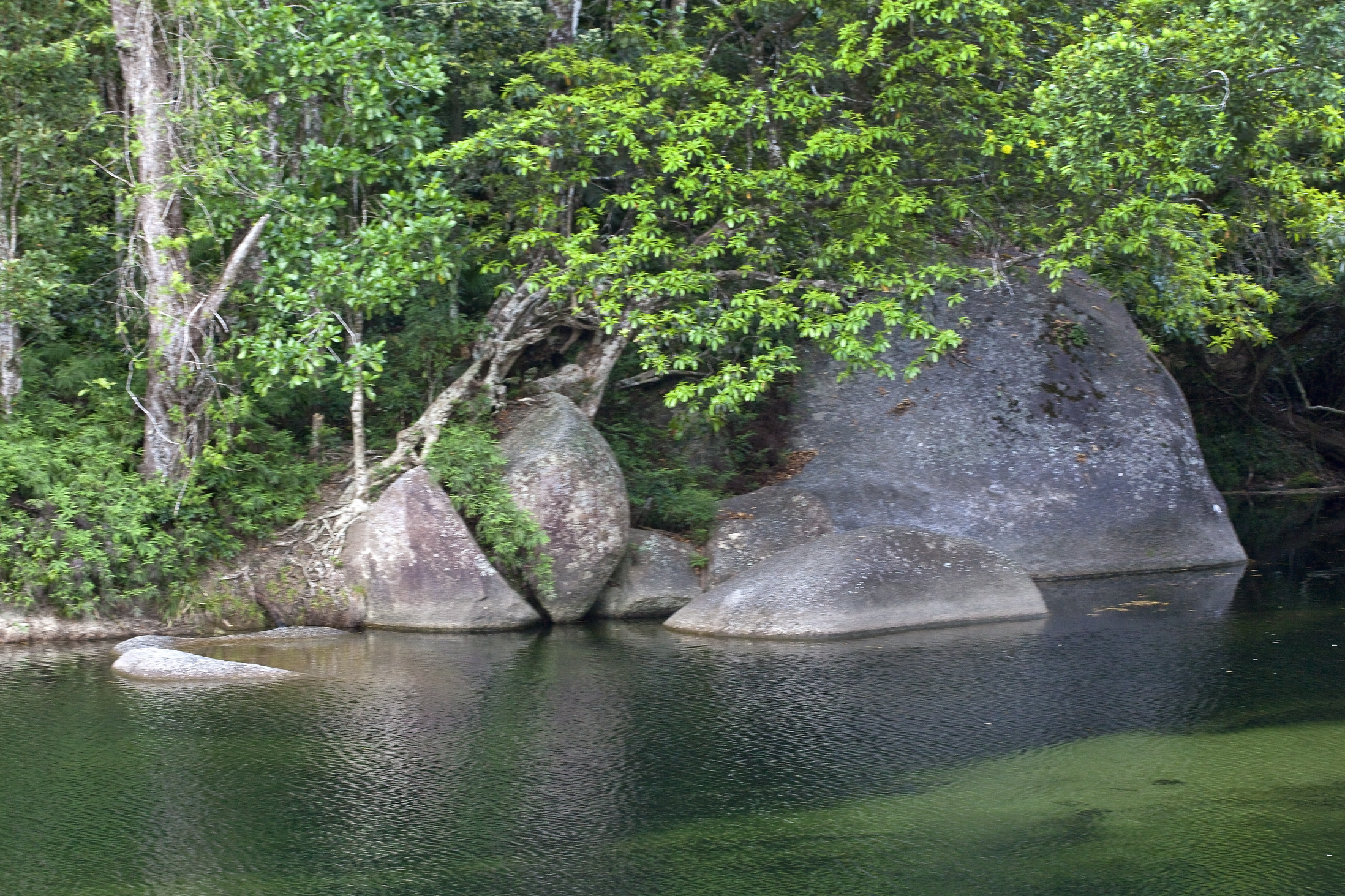
The Boulders main swimming hole

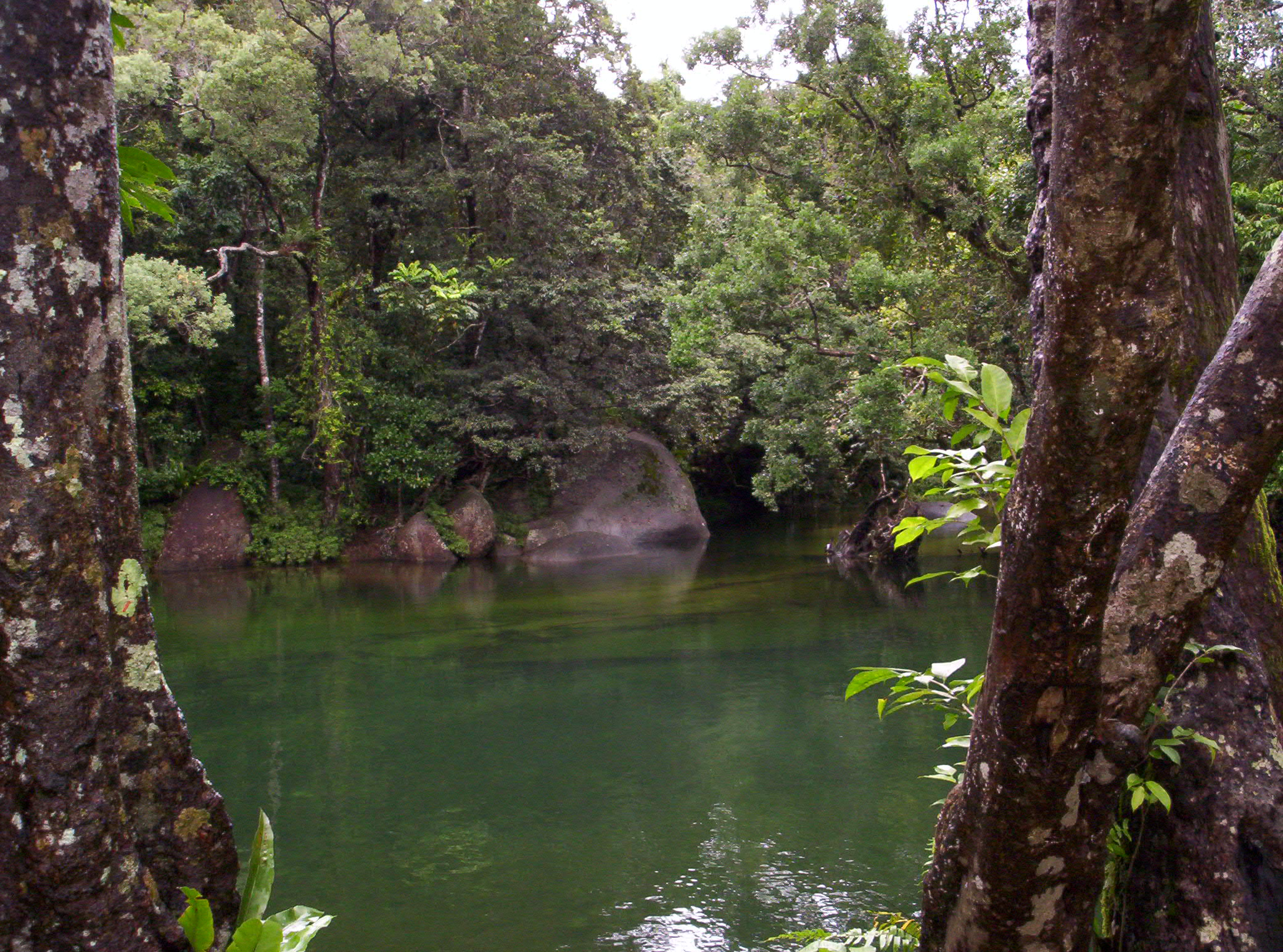
The main swimming hole

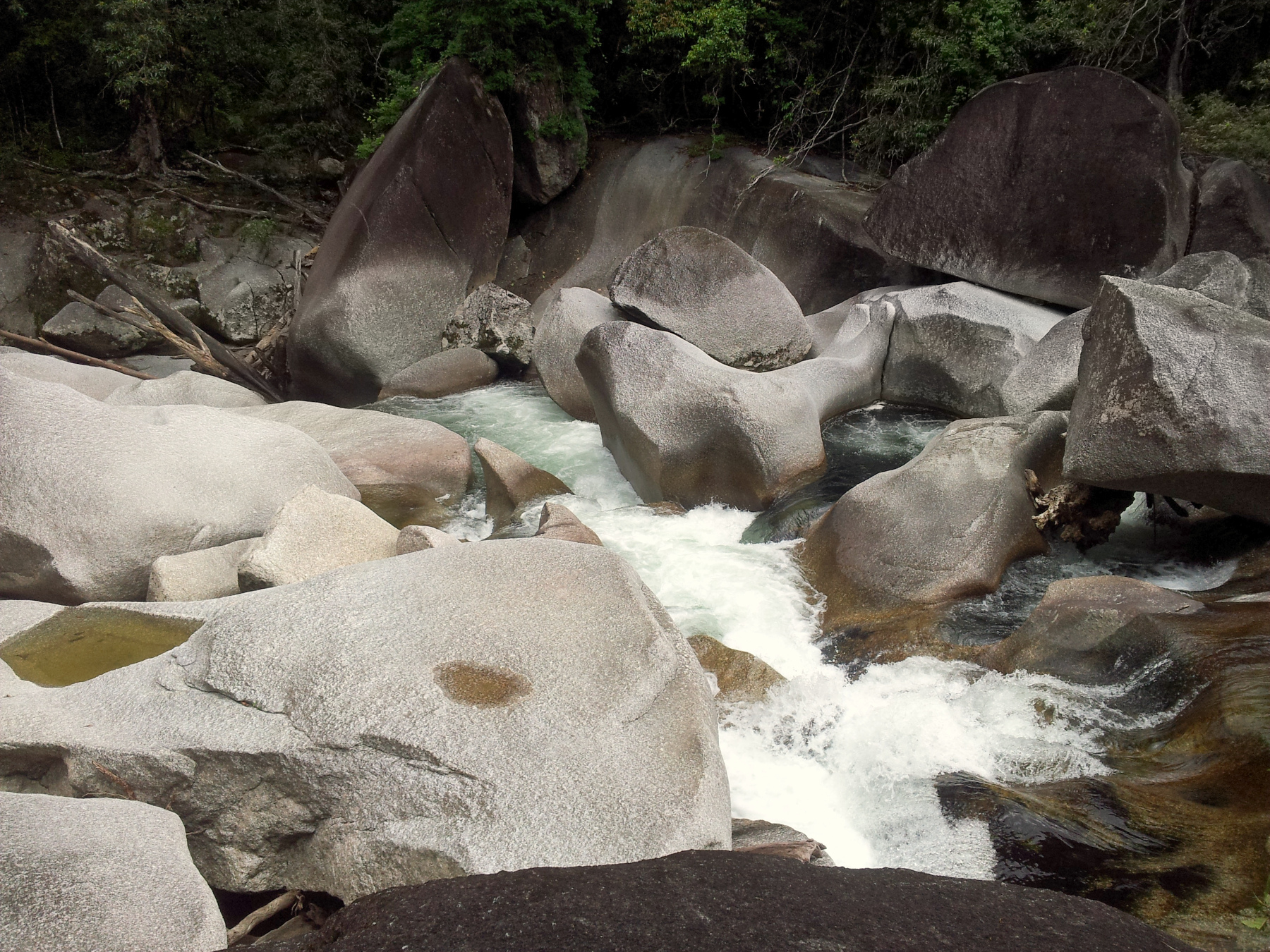
Water rushing between boulders from the Devil's Pool

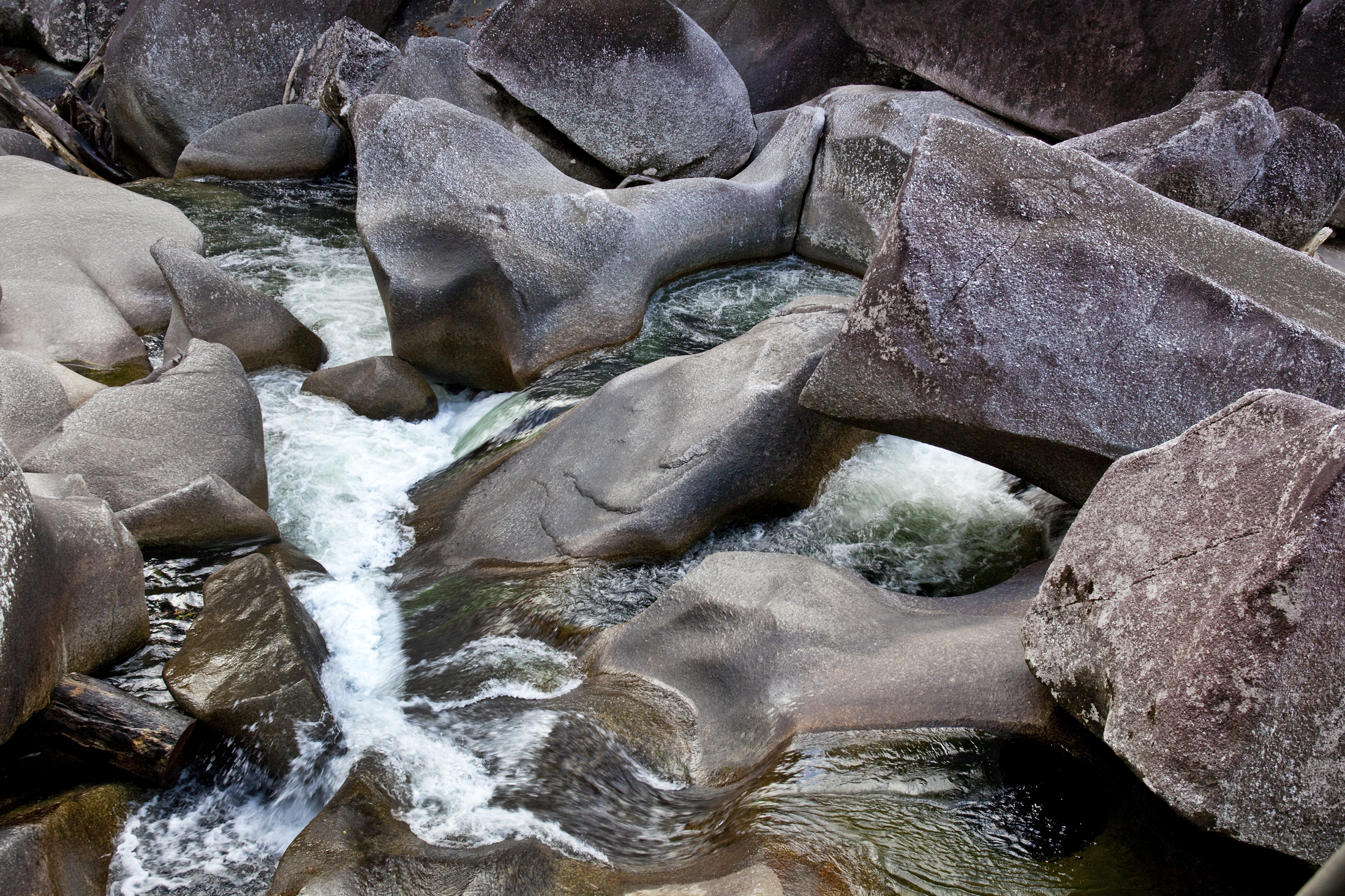
Babinda Creek below the Devil's Pool
