= Bellenden Ker Range =

Mountain range in Queensland, Australia

Bellenden Ker
- Wooroonooran
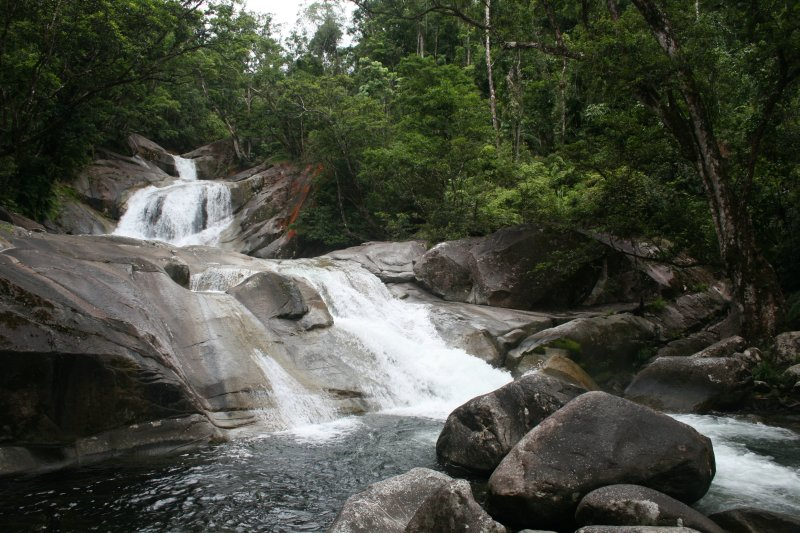
- Josephine Falls in Wooroonooran National Park

Highest point
- Peak: Mount Bartle Frere
- Elevation: 1,622 m (5,322 ft)

Geography
- Country: Australia
- State: Queensland
- Region: Far North Queensland
- Range coordinates: 17°14′S 145°52′E
- Parent range: Great Dividing Range

The Bellenden Ker Range, also known as the Wooroonooran Range, is a coastal mountain range in Far North Queensland, Australia. Part of the Great Dividing Range it is located between Gordonvale and Babinda.

The whole of the range falls within the Wet Tropics World Heritage Area and is covered in richly diverse world heritage listed wet tropical forests, including species of flora and fauna endemic to the range. The range also forms part of the Wooroonooran Important Bird Area, identified as such by BirdLife International because it supports populations of a range of bird species endemic to Queensland's Wet Tropics. Most of the range is also a gazetted protected area named Wooroonooran National Park.

Queensland's two highest mountains – Mount Bartle Frere (1622 m) and Mount Bellenden Ker (1593 m) – form part of this range, and Walshs Pyramid (922 m), one of the highest free-standing natural pyramids in the world, is located at the range's northern end.

== History ==
The mountains were sighted by Lieutenant James Cook but weren't given the name "Bellenden Ker Range" before Lieutenant Phillip Parker King named them, on 22 June 1819, whilst aboard the Mermaid. Lieutenant Phillip King named the range after the English botanist John Bellenden Ker Gawler, following the suggestion made to him by his ships own botanist, Allan Cunningham. Archibald Meston was an early explorer of the range.

== Rivers ==
The Mulgrave River rises on the southwestern slopes of the range and then flows north around the northern end and then turns south flowing parallel to the eastern side. Russell River drains the southeast parts of the range. A number of waterfalls cascade off the range including Kearneys Falls, Fishery Falls, Josephine Falls, Tchupala Falls, Wallicher Falls, Nandroya Falls, Silver Creek Falls, Whites Falls, and Clamshell Falls.

== See also ==
- List of mountains in Australia
