= Acrotriche baileyana =

Scientific classification
- Kingdom: Plantae
- Clade: Tracheophytes
- Clade: Angiosperms
- Clade: Eudicots
- Clade: Asterids
- Order: Ericales
- Family: Ericaceae
- Genus: Acrotriche
- Species: A. baileyana

Binomial name
- Acrotriche baileyana (Domin) J.M.Powell
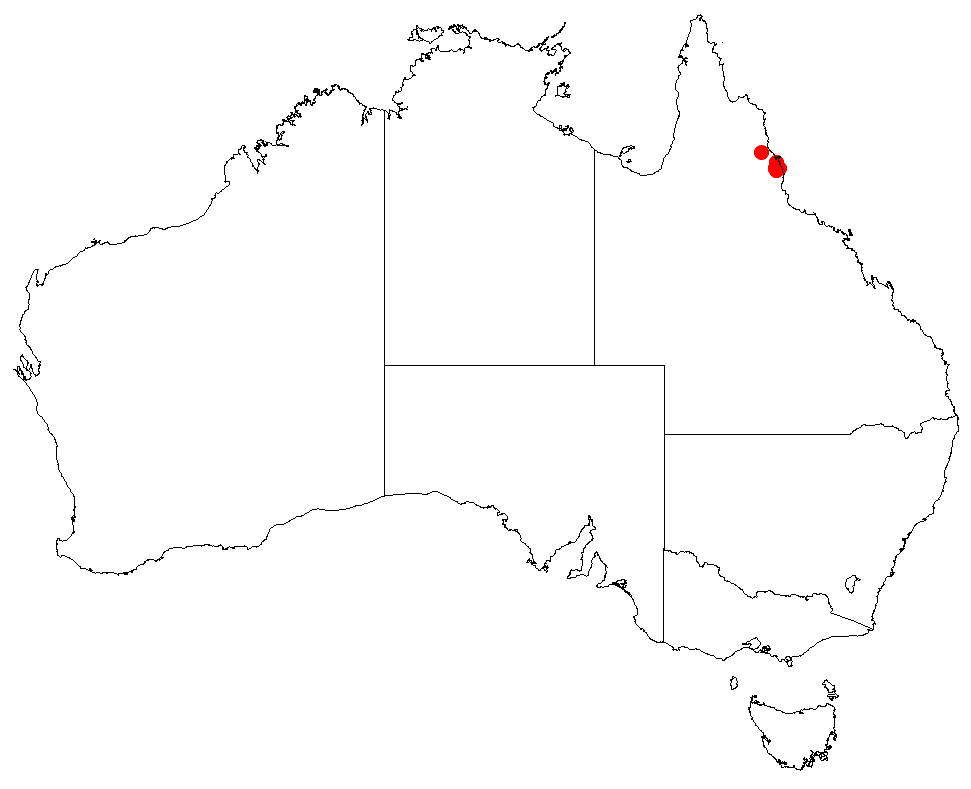
- Occurrence data from Australasian Virtual Herbarium

Species of plant

Acrotriche baileyana is a species of flowering plant in the family Ericaceae and is endemic to far north Queensland. It is an erect shrub with crowded elliptical leaves, spikes of small, tube-shaped, greenish-white flowers, and deep scarlet drupes.

== Description ==
Acrotriche baileyana is an erect shrub that typically grows to a height of 0.5–4 m (1 ft 8 in – 13 ft 1 in) with many branches and young branchlets covered with soft hairs, later covered with fine mosses or liverworts. The leaves are elliptic, 18–31 mm (0.71–1.22 in) long and 6–11 mm (0.24–0.43 in) wide on a petiole 1.5–2.0 mm (0.059–0.079 in) long, the upper surface dark green and the lower surface glaucous. The flowers are arranged in spikes of 5 to 10 on old wood, with bracteoles 1.4 mm (0.055 in) long at the base of the sepals. The sepals are 1.6–1.7 mm (0.063–0.067 in) long, and the petals are joined at the base to form a greenish-white tube, 1.6–1.8 mm (0.063–0.071 in), with lobes 1.4–1.5 mm (0.055–0.059 in) long. The fruit is a deep scarlet, flattened spherical drupe 6–7 mm (0.24–0.28 in) in diameter.

== Taxonomy ==
This species was first formally described in 1913 by Karel Domin who gave it the name Monotoca baileyana in Repertorium Specierum Novarum Regni Vegetabilis from a specimen collected on Mount Bartle Frere by Frederick Manson Bailey. In 1980, Jocelyn Marie Powell transferred the species to the genus Acrotriche as A. baileyana, in the journal Telopea. The specific epithet (baileyana) honours Frederick Manson Bailey. Domin noted that he named "this very interesting plant, growing on the highest mountains in tropical Australia" in honour of F.M. Bailey.

== Distribution ==
This species grows is known from the Russell River, Mount Bartle Frere and Walshs Pyramid in far north Queensland.
