= Podocarpus dispermus =

- Habit

Conservation status
- Least Concern (IUCN 3.1)

Scientific classification
- Kingdom: Plantae
- Clade: Tracheophytes
- Clade: Gymnosperms
- Division: Pinophyta
- Class: Pinopsida
- Order: Araucariales
- Family: Podocarpaceae
- Genus: Podocarpus
- Species: P. dispermus

Binomial name
- Podocarpus dispermus C.T.White

Synonyms
- Margbensonia disperma (C.T.White) A.V.Bobrov & Melikyan

Species of conifer

Podocarpus dispermus, the broad-leaved brown pine, is a species of conifer in the family Podocarpaceae. It is endemic to Queensland, Australia, where it is restricted to rainforest on and near the Atherton Tableland. It was first described in 1933 and has a conservation status of least concerned.

== Description ==
Podocarpus dispermus is a tree reaching 20 m (66 ft) in height with thin fibrous bark. Leaf buds are conical and about three times longer than they are wide. The leaves are glossy green, linear, up to 3 cm (1.2 in) wide and 20 cm (7.9 in) long. They have very short petioles and the midrib is prominent on both surfaces.

The cones occur in the leaf axils – the stemless pollen cones are cylindrical and measure up to 30 mm (1.2 in) long and 3 mm (0.12 in) wide, the seed cones rest on a thick peduncle up to 15 mm (0.6 in) long with a receptacle about 6 mm (0.24 in) long. The receptacle is bright red, large and fleshy at maturity, the mature seeds are about 25 mm (1 in) long and 17 mm (0.7 in) diameter.

== Distribution and habitat ==
The broad-leaved brown pine inhabits rainforest on various soils, at altitudes from about 40 to 720 m (130 to 2,360 ft). It occurs on the Atherton Tableland and the foothills of the adjacent Mount Bartle Frere and Mount Bellenden Ker.

== Conservation ==
This species was assessed by the International Union for Conservation of Nature (IUCN) in 2010 and found to be of least concern. It is also rated as least concern by the Queensland Government under its Nature Conservation Act. In its statement, the IUCN recognises some concerns for the species such as seedling consumption by feral pigs, as well as a restricted geographical range, but states that there is currently no evidence of a decline in the population. As of September 2026, the assessment has been annotated with "needs updating".

== Taxonomy ==
Podocarpus dispermus was first described in 1933 by Australian botanist Cyril Tenison White. His description was based on several specimens collected from the Atherton Tableland in 1930, and was published in the book Ligneous plants collected for the Arnold Arboretum in North Queensland by S. F. Kajewski in 1929.

In 1998, Russian botanists Alexey Vladimir Bobrov and Aleksander Pavlovich Melikyan published a paper in which they transferred this species to the combination Margbensonia disperma, however it was not accepted and that name is now treated as a synonym.

== Ecology ==
Fruits of this species are known to be eaten by cassowaries and musky rat-kangaroos.

== Gallery ==
Trunk

Foliage

Seed cones

Pollen cones

Mature fruit
