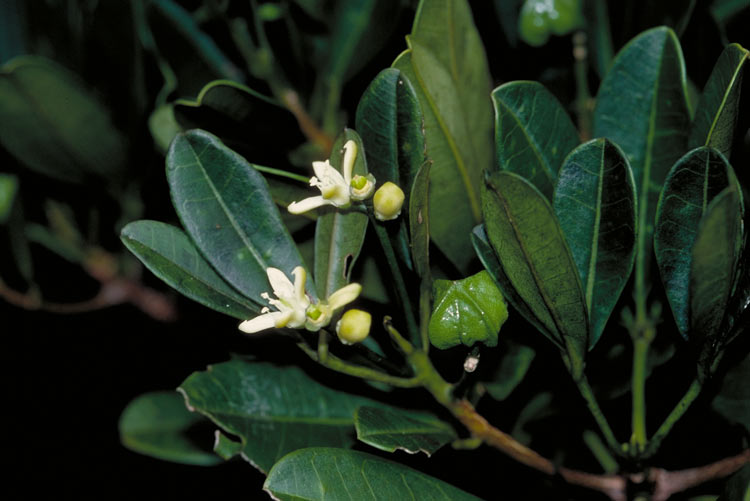

Scientific classification
- Kingdom: Plantae
- Clade: Embryophytes
- Clade: Tracheophytes
- Clade: Spermatophytes
- Clade: Angiosperms
- Clade: Eudicots
- Clade: Rosids
- Order: Sapindales
- Family: Rutaceae
- Genus: Acronychia
- Species: A. chooreechillum

Binomial name
- Acronychia chooreechillum (F.M.Bailey) C.T.White

Synonyms
- Melicope chooreechillum F.M.Bailey

= Acronychia chooreechillum =

Mountain aspen

Species of flowering plant

Acronychia chooreechillum, commonly known as mountain aspen, is a species of shrub or small rainforest tree that is endemic to north-eastern Queensland, Australia. It has mostly trifoliate leaves with elliptic to egg-shaped leaflets on stems that are more or less cylindrical, flowers in small groups in leaf axils and fleshy, egg-shaped or elliptical fruit.

== Description ==
Acronychia chooreechillum is a shrub or tree that typically grows to a height of 15 m (49 ft) and has cylindrical stems. The leaves are usually trifoliate, sometimes simple, on a petiole 15–60 mm (0.59–2.36 in) long. The leaflets are elliptic to egg-shaped with the narrower end towards the base, mostly 40–75 mm (1.6–3.0 in) long and 16–35 mm (0.63–1.38 in) wide on a petiolule 4 mm (0.16 in) long. The flowers are arranged in small groups 25–60 mm (0.98–2.36 in) long in leaf axils, each flower on a pedicel 1.5–5 mm (0.059–0.197 in) long. The four sepals are 1.3–2 mm (0.051–0.079 in) wide, the four petals 6–9 mm (0.24–0.35 in) long and the eight stamens alternate in length. Flowering occurs from June to December and the fruit is a fleshy drupe 10–15 mm (0.39–0.59 in) long and egg-shaped to elliptical in outline.

== Taxonomy ==
Mountain aspen was first formally described in 1889 by Frederick Manson Bailey in Archibald Meston's report to the Queensland Government on his Government Scientific Expedition to the Bellenden-Ker Range (Woonooroonan). Bailey gave it the name Melicope chooreechillum from specimens he collected on the summit of Mount Bellenden Ker at an altitude of 5,200 ft (1,600 m). In 1933, Cyril Tenison White changed the name to Acronychia chooreechillum in the journal Contributions from the Arnold Arboretum of Harvard University. The specific epithet (chooreechillum) is derived from an Aboriginal name for Mount Bartle Frere.

== Distribution and habitat ==
This tree grows in mountain rainforest and windswept forest on exposed ridges from Mount Finnigan in the Cedar Bay National Park to the Bellenden Ker Range in north-east Queensland, at altitudes between 1,000 and 1,600 m (3,300 and 5,200 ft).

== Conservation status ==
Mountain aspen is classified as of "least concern" under the Queensland Government Nature Conservation Act 1992.
