= Saccolabiopsis rectifolia =

Tiny pitcher orchid

Scientific classification
- Kingdom: Plantae
- Clade: Tracheophytes
- Clade: Angiosperms
- Clade: Monocots
- Order: Asparagales
- Family: Orchidaceae
- Subfamily: Epidendroideae
- Genus: Saccolabiopsis
- Species: S. rectifolia

Binomial name
- Saccolabiopsis rectifolia (Dockrill) Garay

Synonyms
- Robiquetia rectifolia Dockrill

Species of orchid

Saccolabiopsis rectifolia, commonly known as the tiny pitcher orchid, is an epiphytic orchid from the family Orchidaceae. It has a short stem, thin roots, between three and six crowded leaves and up to fifteen cup-shaped green flowers with a white, purple spotted labellum. It grows on the thinnest outer branches of rainforest trees in tropical North Queensland, Australia.

== Description ==
Saccolabiopsis rectifolia is a tiny epiphytic herb with a single main growth, thin roots and an unbranched stem 1–15 millimetres (0.039–0.59 in) long. There are between three and six crowded, thin, light green to yellowish leaves 15–40 millimetres (0.59–1.6 in) long and 6–10 millimetres (0.24–0.39 in) wide. Between four and fifteen cup-shaped, resupinate green flowers about 3 millimetres (0.12 in) long and 2 millimetres (0.079 in) wide are arranged on a thin flowering stem 20–60 millimetres (0.79–2.4 in) long. The sepals and petals are about 2 millimetres (0.079 in) long and 1 millimetre (0.039 in) wide. The labellum is white with purple spots, about 2 millimetres (0.079 in) long and 1.5 millimetres (0.059 in) wide with a beak-like tip and a nectar bearing spur. Flowering occurs from June to August.

== Taxonomy and naming ==
The tiny pitcher orchid was first formally described in 1967 by Alick William Dockrill and given the name Robiquetia rectifolia. The description was published in Australasian Sarcanthinae. In 1972, Leslie Andrew Garay changed the name to Saccolabiopsis rectifolia. The specific epithet (rectifolia) is derived from the Latin words rectus meaning "straight", "upright", "proper" or "right" and folia meaning "leaves".

== Distribution and habitat ==
Saccolabiopsis rectifolia grows on the thinnest outer branches of rainforest trees between the Russell and Johnstone Rivers in Queensland.
