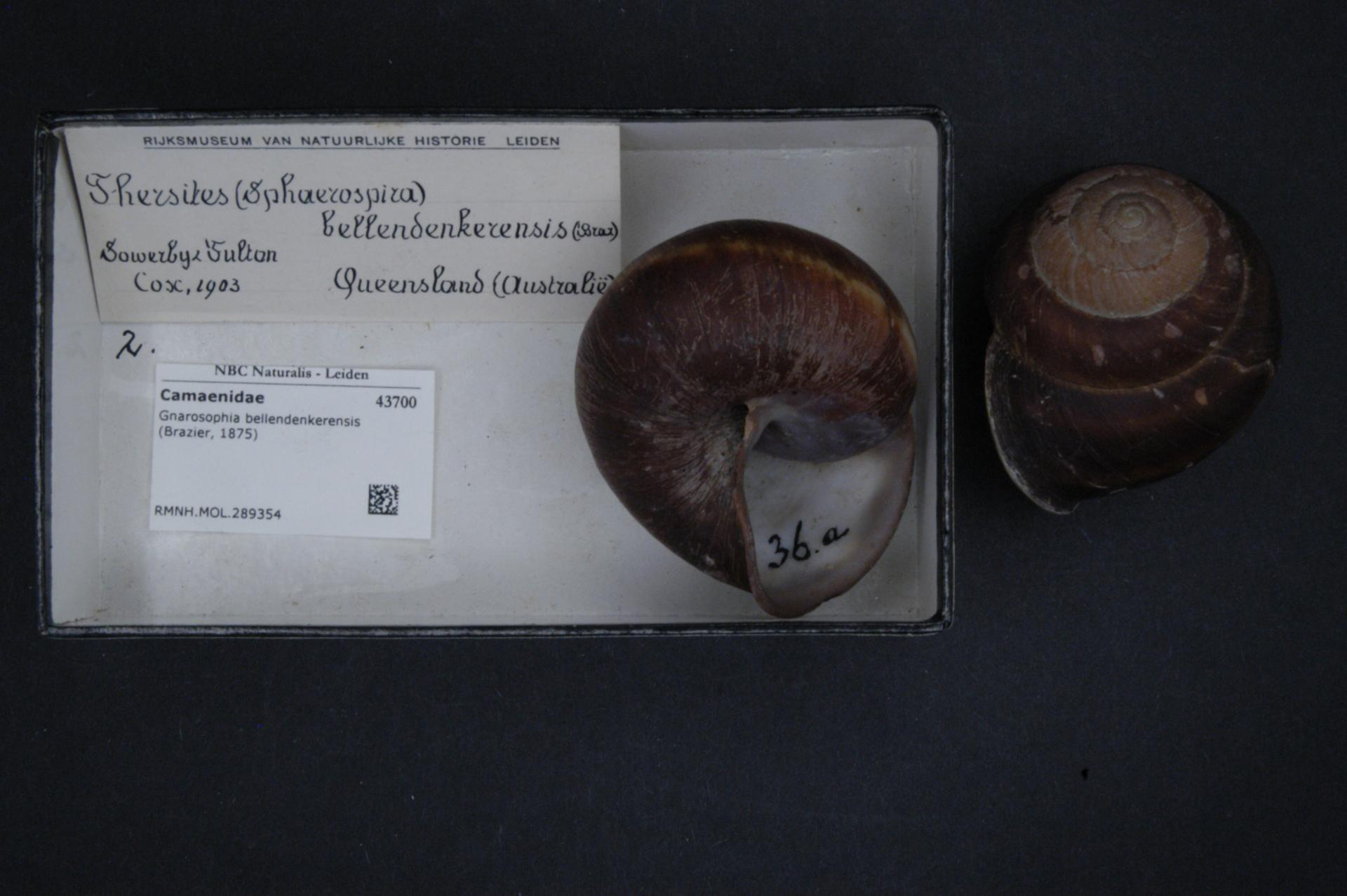
- Shells of the Gnarosophia bellendenkerensis

Scientific classification
- Domain: Eukaryota
- Kingdom: Animalia
- Phylum: Mollusca
- Class: Gastropoda
- Order: Stylommatophora
- Family: Camaenidae
- Genus: Gnarosophia
- Species: G. bellendenkerensis

Binomial name
- Gnarosophia bellendenkerensis (Brazier, 1875)

Synonyms
- Helix beddomae Brazier, 1878; Helix bellendenkerensis Brazier, 1875; Thersites castanea Odhner, 1917; Gnarosophia humoricola Iredale, 1937; Thersites pterinus Clench & Archer, 1938

= Gnarosophia bellendenkerensis =

Species of gastropod

Gnarosophia bellendenkerensis is a species of air-breathing land snail, a terrestrial pulmonate gastropod mollusk in the family Camaenidae.

== Distribution ==
This species lives in rainforests in North Queensland, Australia.

The type locality is Bellenden Ker Mountains, Queensland.

== Description ==
The height of the shell is 33.08 mm. The width of the shell is 40.19 mm.

== Ecology ==
These snails live in leaf litter or under logs in the mesothermal rainforest.
