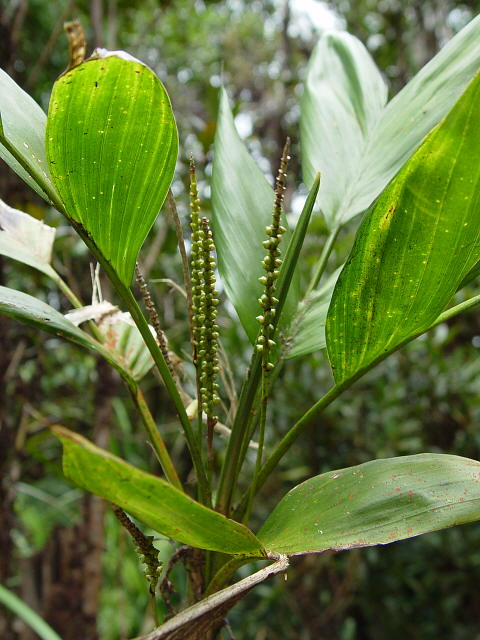
- On Mount Bartle Frere

Conservation status
- Near Threatened (IUCN 3.1)

Scientific classification
- Kingdom: Plantae
- Clade: Tracheophytes
- Clade: Angiosperms
- Clade: Monocots
- Clade: Commelinids
- Order: Arecales
- Family: Arecaceae
- Genus: Linospadix
- Species: L. palmerianus

Binomial name
- Linospadix palmerianus (F.M.Bailey) Burret

Synonyms
- Bacularia palmeriana F.M.Bailey; Bacularia aequisegmentosa Domin; Linospadix aequisegmentosus (Domin) Burret

= Linospadix palmerianus =

Species of flowering plant

Linospadix palmerianus, commonly known as walking stick palm, is a species of plant in the palm family Arecaceae. It is native to the Wet Tropics bioregion of Queensland, Australia.

== Description ==
Linospadix palmerianus is a small palm with a clustering habit that can reach up to 3 m (9.8 ft) tall with a stem diameter of about 2.5 cm (1 in). The leaves are variable, with between 2 and 24 discrete segments. The petiole (leaf stalk) may be up to 13 cm (5.1 in) long. Flowers are produced on a pendant spike up to 90 cm (35 in) long including the peduncle, carrying both male and female flowers. The fruits are red or yellow drupes, somewhat ellipsoid or cylindrical, measuring about 15 mm (0.59 in) long and 7 mm (0.28 in) wide and containing a single seed.

== Distribution and habitat ==
The species is endemic to northeast Queensland and grows in the understory of rainforest. It is restricted to Mount Bartle Frere, Mount Bellenden Ker and their foothills, at altitudes from 300 to 1,600 m (980 to 5,250 ft).

== Taxonomy ==
The species was first described in 1889 (as Bacularia palmeriana) by Australian botanist Frederick Manson Bailey. It was later transferred to its current name in 1935 by German botanist Max Burret and was published in the German-language journal Notizblatt des Botanischen Gartens und Museums zu Berlin-Dahlem.

== Conservation ==
Linospadix palmerianus has been given a conservation status of near-threatened by the International Union for Conservation of Nature (IUCN) and by the Queensland Government under its Nature Conservation Act.
