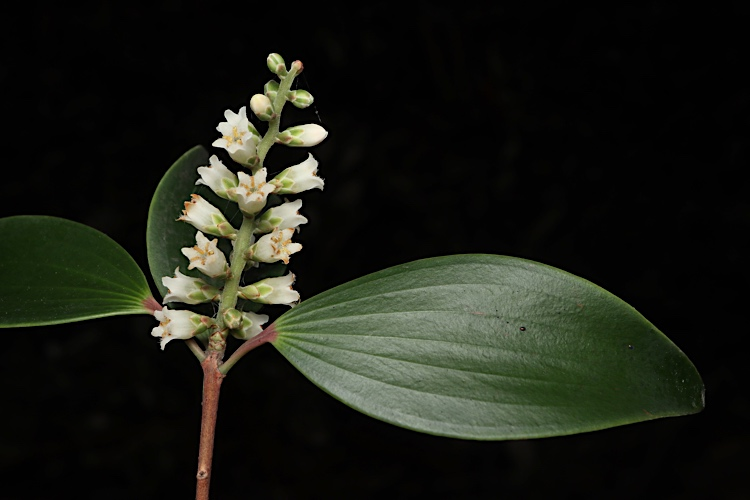
- Inflorescence

Conservation status
- Least Concern (NCA)

Scientific classification
- Kingdom: Plantae
- Clade: Tracheophytes
- Clade: Angiosperms
- Clade: Eudicots
- Clade: Asterids
- Order: Ericales
- Family: Ericaceae
- Genus: Trochocarpa
- Species: T. bellendenkerensis

Binomial name
- Trochocarpa bellendenkerensis Domin
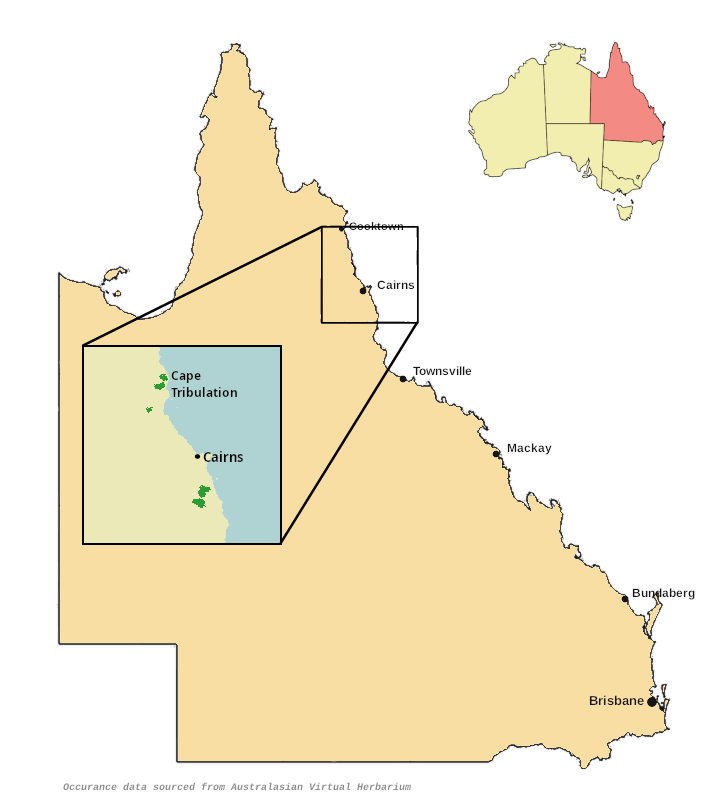

= Trochocarpa bellendenkerensis =

Species of flowering plant

Trochocarpa bellendenkerensis, commonly known as wheel fruit, is a species of plant in the family Ericaceae. It is native to a small part of the Wet Tropics bioregion of Queensland, Australia.

== Description ==
Trochocarpa bellendenkerensis is a shrub or small tree to about 7 m (23 ft) tall. The leaves average about 40 mm (1.6 in) long and 15 mm (0.59 in) wide. They are broadest near the base and taper evenly to a pointed tip at both ends, and they have between five and seven longitudinal veins.

White flowers are borne on a spike which may reach up to 5 cm (2.0 in) in length. The flowers have a corolla tube about 2.5 mm (0.10 in) long with five lobes about 1.5 mm (0.06 in) long. They have five stamens and a single pistil.

The fruit are blue, purple or black drupes, measuring about 8 mm (0.31 in) wide and 4 mm (0.16 in) long and containing contain five to ten seeds.

== Distribution and habitat ==
The species occurs from near Cape Tribulation, about 150 km (93 mi) north of Cairns, to Mount Bellenden Ker and Mount Bartle Frere about 70 km (43 mi) south of the city. It grows in very wet upland rainforest and stunted mountaintop forest above 600 m (2,000 ft).

== Taxonomy ==
Trochocarpa bellendenkerensis was first described by Czech botanist Karel Domin in 1928.

== Conservation ==
This species is listed as least concern under the Queensland Government's Nature Conservation Act. As of 17 February 2026, it has not been assessed by the International Union for Conservation of Nature.
