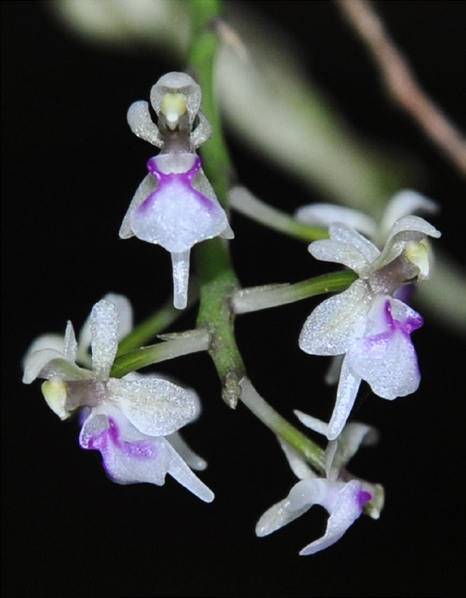

Scientific classification
- Kingdom: Plantae
- Clade: Tracheophytes
- Clade: Angiosperms
- Clade: Monocots
- Order: Asparagales
- Family: Orchidaceae
- Subfamily: Epidendroideae
- Tribe: Vandeae
- Subtribe: Aeridinae
- Genus: Saccolabiopsis; J.J.Sm.

= Saccolabiopsis =

Genus of orchids

Saccolabiopsis, commonly known as pitcher orchids, is a genus of flowering plants from the orchid family, Orchidaceae. Plants in this genus are small epiphytes with short, fibrous stems, smooth, thin roots, a few thin, oblong to lance-shaped leaves in two ranks and large numbers of small green flowers on an unbranched flowering stem. There are about fifteen species found from the eastern Himalayas to the south-west Pacific.

== Description ==
Orchids in the genus Saccolabiopsis are epiphytic, monopodial herbs with short stems and many smooth thin roots. The leaves are arranged in two ranks, oblong to lance-shaped, uncrowded and sometimes appear fan-like. A large number of small, uncrowded, mainly greenish, fragrant flowers are arranged on an unbranched flowering stem. The sepals and petals are narrow, and the labellum is stiffly attached to the column and has a deep cylindrical spur or pouch.

== Taxonomy and naming ==
The genus Saccolabiopsis was first formally described in 1918 by Johannes Jacobus Smith and the description was published in Bulletin du Jardin botanique de Buitenzorg. The type species is Saccolabiopsis bakhuizenii. The name Saccolabiopsis is a reference to the similarity of these orchids to those in the genus Saccolabium. The ending -opsis is an Ancient Greek suffix meaning "having the appearance of" or "like".

Species list: The following is a list of species of Saccolabiopsis accepted by Plants of the World Online as at February 2022:

- Saccolabiopsis alata J.J.Sm. - New Guinea
- Saccolabiopsis armitii (F.Muell.) Dockrill - New Guinea, Queensland
- Saccolabiopsis bakhuizenii J.J.Sm. - Java, Sumatra
- Saccolabiopsis gillespiei (L.O.Williams) Garay - Fiji
- Saccolabiopsis microphyton (Schltr.) J.J.Sm - Bismarck Islands
- Saccolabiopsis pallida (Schltr.) J.J.Sm - New Guinea
- Saccolabiopsis papuana J.J.Sm. - New Guinea
- Saccolabiopsis pumila Garay - New Guinea
- Saccolabiopsis pusilla (Lindl.) Seidenf. & Garay - Himalayas, Thailand, Myanmar, Assam, Bhutan, Bangladesh
- Saccolabiopsis rara (Schltr.) J.J.Sm. - New Guinea, Solomons
- Saccolabiopsis rectifolia (Dockrill) Garay - Queensland
- Saccolabiopsis selebica J.J.Sm. - Sulawesi
- Saccolabiopsis tenella (Ames) Garay - Philippines
- Saccolabiopsis viridiflora Aver. - Philippines, Taiwan, Vietnam

== Distribution ==
Species of Saccolabiopsis are found in the eastern Himalayas, the Indian subcontinent, Indochina, Malesia, Papuasia, Fiji and Queensland, Australia where two species are endemic.

== See also ==
- List of Orchidaceae genera
