= Gnarosophia =

Scientific classification
- Kingdom: Animalia
- Phylum: Mollusca
- Class: Gastropoda
- Order: Stylommatophora
- Family: Camaenidae
- Genus: Gnarosophia; Iredale, 1933

Genus of gastropods

Gnarosophia is a genus of air-breathing land snails, terrestrial pulmonate gastropod mollusks in the family Camaenidae.

== Species ==
Species within the genus Gnarosophia include:

- Gnarosophia bellendenkerensis (Brazier, 1875)
