= Saccolabiopsis armitii =

Scientific classification
- Kingdom: Plantae
- Clade: Tracheophytes
- Clade: Angiosperms
- Clade: Monocots
- Order: Asparagales
- Family: Orchidaceae
- Subfamily: Epidendroideae
- Genus: Saccolabiopsis
- Species: S. armitii

Binomial name
- Saccolabiopsis armitii (F.Muell.) Dockrill

Synonyms
- Sarcochilus armitii F.Muell.; Cleisostoma armitii (F.Muell.) F.M.Bailey; Saccolabium armitii (F.Muell.) Rupp; Cleisostoma armitii F.Muell. nom. inval., pro syn.; Cleisostoma nugentii F.M.Bailey; Cleisostoma orbiculare Rupp; Saccolabium orbiculare (Rupp) Rupp

Species of orchid

Saccolabiopsis armitii, commonly known as the spotted pitcher orchid, is an epiphytic orchid from the family Orchidaceae. It has a short stem, coarse, wiry roots, between three and six crowded, curved leaves and up to fifty yellowish green flowers with red markings and a white labellum. It usually grows in coastal scrub to rainforest in New Guinea and tropical North Queensland, Australia.

== Description ==
Saccolabiopsis armitii is an epiphytic herb with a single main growth, coarse wiry roots and a stem 20–50 millimetres (0.79–2.0 in) long. There are between three and six crowded, curved leaves 30–60 millimetres (1.2–2.4 in) long and 10–12 millimetres (0.39–0.47 in) wide with a prominent midrib on the lower surface. Between twenty and fifty cup-shaped, resupinate, yellowish green flowers with red markings 5–7 millimetres (0.20–0.28 in) long and 3–5 millimetres (0.12–0.20 in) wide are arranged on a pendulous flowering stem 50–90 millimetres (2.0–3.5 in) long. The dorsal sepal is about 2 millimetres (0.079 in) long, 1 millimetre (0.039 in) wide and the lateral sepals are a similar width but longer. The petals are about 1 millimetre (0.039 in) long and wide. The labellum is white, about 2 millimetres (0.079 in) long and 1 millimetre (0.039 in) wide with three lobes and a red anther. The side lobes are triangular and the middle lobe is short and rounded. Flowering occurs from September to December.

== Taxonomy and naming ==
The spotted pitcher orchid was first formally described in 1875 by Ferdinand von Mueller and given the name Sarcochilus armitii. The description was published in Fragmenta phytographiae Australiae. In 1886, Frederick Manson Bailey changed the name to Saccolabiopsis armitii. The specific epithet (armitii) honours William Armit who collected the type specimen.

== Distribution and habitat ==
Saccolabiopsis armitii grows in coastal scrub and rainforest up to 150 kilometres (93 mi) from the coast. It is found in New Guinea and in Queensland between Weipa and Bundaberg.
