= Wooroonooran National Park =

National park in Queensland, Australia

- IUCN category II (national park)
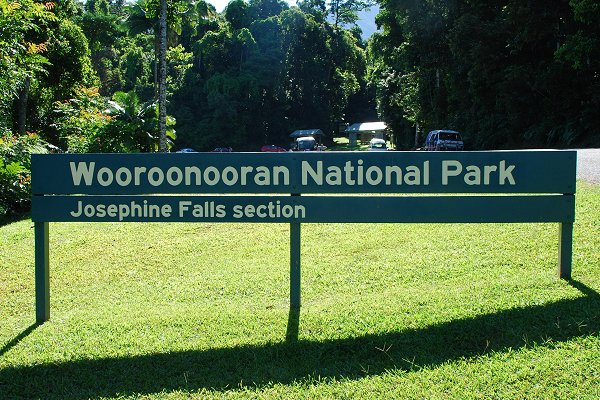
- Signage

- Location within Queensland
- Location: Queensland
- Nearest city: Innisfail
- Coordinates: 17°08′47″S 145°47′36″E
- Area: 798 km^{2} (308 sq mi)
- Established: 1991
- Governing body: Queensland Parks and Wildlife Service
- Website: Official website

Wooroonooran National Park (Aboriginal for "Black Rock") is a national park in Queensland, Australia, 1,367 km northwest of Brisbane, between Innisfail and Cairns.

The park is one of the Wet Tropics World Heritage Area series of national parks, and is a gazetted World Heritage Site. Declared in 1988, the World Heritage area stretches from Townsville in the south to Cooktown in the north, and contains some of the oldest surviving rainforests in the world.

The national park covers most of Bellenden Ker Range and includes Queensland's two highest mountains, Mount Bartle Frere (1622 m) and Mount Bellenden Ker (1592 m). Walshs Pyramid at 922 m in height, is located just south of Gordonvale and is one of the highest free-standing natural pyramids in the world. It also includes the parts of Australia that on average receive the most rainfall each year.

The park has two sections: the Palmerston and the Josephine sections. Both the North and South branches of the Johnstone River flow through the Palmerston section.

== Waterfalls ==
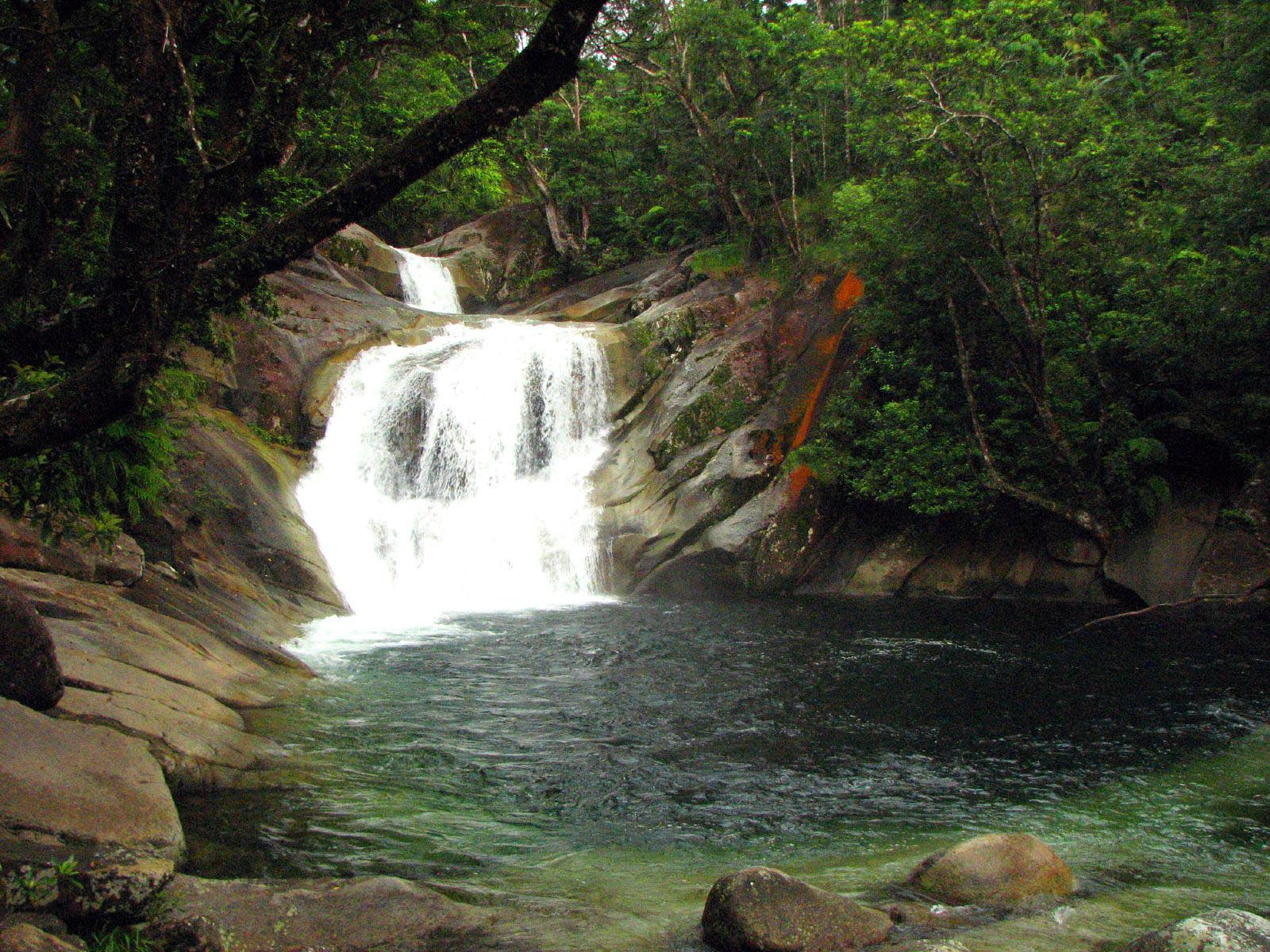
Josephine Falls, 2008

The Josephine Falls visitor area was developed and opened to the public in the 1970s. The water in Josephine Creek originates from the slopes of Mount Bartle Frere and flows into the Russell River. A 600 m walking track leads through rainforest to recently constructed platforms which allow safe viewing of the falls. Several people have been injured and killed in the falls as the granite rocks are extremely slippery so access to the top pool beyond the platforms is prohibited. Living around the falls area is the endemic Bartle Frere skink.

Thirty kilometres west of the Bruce Highway along the Palmerston Highway, tracks lead to Tchupala Falls and Wallicher Falls. The Tchupala Falls track is approximately 600 metres and the track to Wallicher Falls is approximately 800 metres. Both Falls are part of Henrietta Creek.

Nandroya Falls may be accessed from a walking track originating at Henrietta Creek Campground. The walk is 2.2 km by the shortest route. At Nandroya Falls, the Douglas Creek drops in a narrow, uninterrupted, 50 metre fall from a basalt parapet. There is also a second shorter and wider tumble. Silver Creek Falls is also visible from the track.

Whites Falls are found on Behana Creek, above Clamshell Falls.

Kearneys Falls are found in the Goldsborough Valley section of Wooroonooran National Park.

Windin Falls was a lesser known waterfall until it became popular on social media because of a natural "infinity pool" at the top of the falls, and sweeping views out over the rainforested valley below. Despite signage warning visitors of the dangers of slippery rocks and fast-flowing water, social media users risk their lives taking photos near and in the infinity pool.

== Flora and fauna ==
Rainforests in the park contain more than 500 different tree species. The high-altitude areas contain Australia's only native species of rhododendron. The park forms part of the Wooroonooran Important Bird Area, identified as such by BirdLife International because it supports populations of a range of bird species endemic to Queensland's Wet Tropics.

== History ==
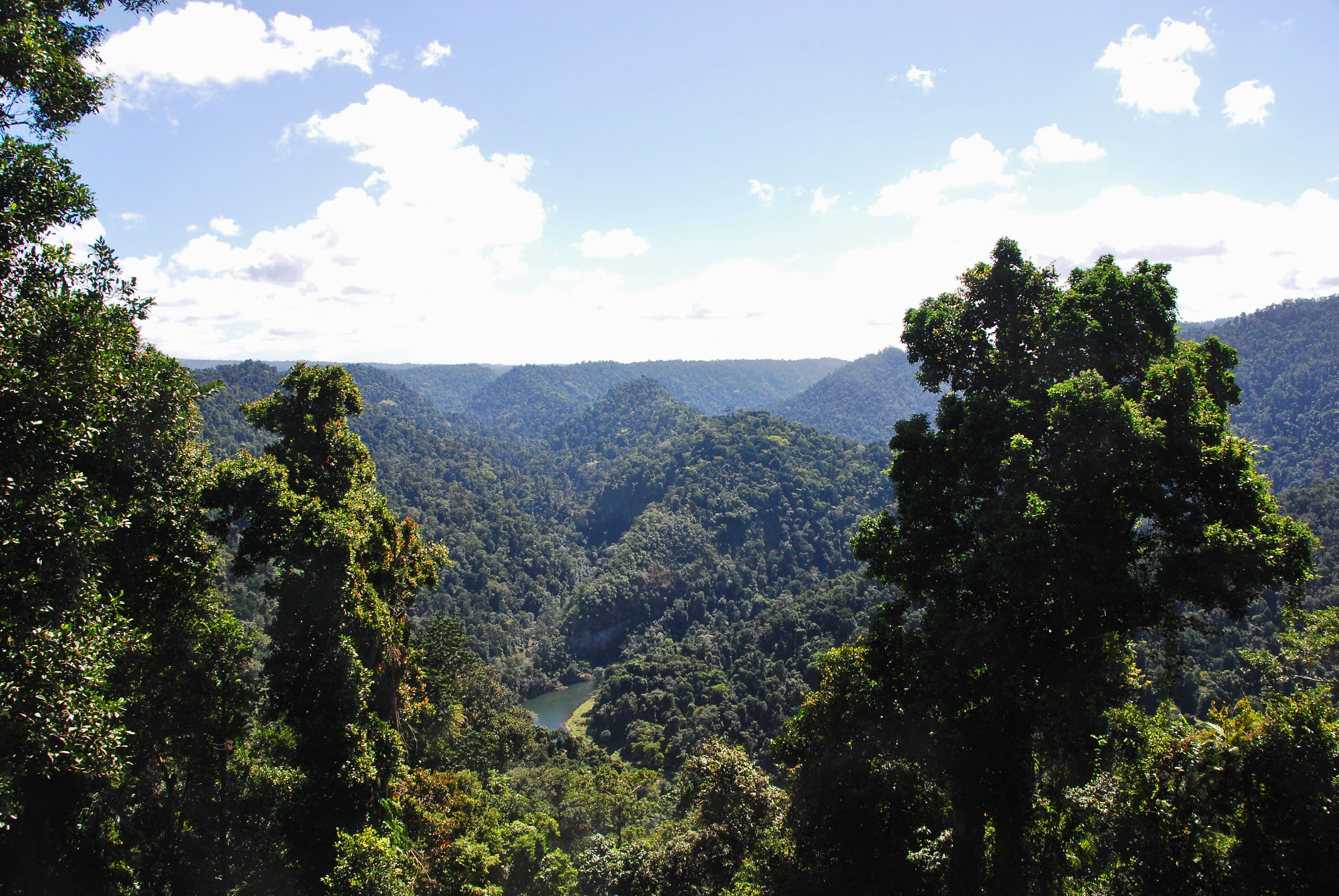
View from the Mamu Tropical Skywalk of Wooroonoon Park, 2017

In 2007 to 2008 the Mamu Rainforest Tropical Skywalk was constructed by the Queensland Parks and Wildlife Service. The work was contracted to Hutchinson Builders Pty Ltd.

== Attractions ==
The Mamu Rainforest Tropical Skywalk is on the Palmerston Highway (17.6129°S 145.7979°E).

== Facilities ==
Camping is permitted in a campground along Henrietta Creek. Bush camping is allowed along the Mount Bartle Frere Trail but no facilities are provided. Permits are required.

== See also ==
- Protected areas of Queensland
