= Russell River National Park =

National park in Australia

- IUCN category II (national park)
- Location within Queensland
- Location: Queensland
- Nearest city: Innisfail
- Coordinates: 17°13′29″S 145°56′20″E
- Area: 41 km^{2} (16 sq mi)
- Established: 1969
- Governing body: Queensland Parks and Wildlife Service
- Website: Official website

Russell River is a national park in North Queensland, Australia, 1352 km northwest of Brisbane. The park protects a coastal strip between the sea and the Russell River. It is part of the Coastal Wet Tropics Important Bird Area, identified as such by BirdLife International because of its importance for the conservation of lowland tropical rainforest birds.

Camping is allowed with a camping permit, but the park itself has no visitor facilities.

== See also ==
- Protected areas of Queensland
