= Wooroonooran Important Bird Area =

Important Bird Area in Queensland, Australia

Coordinates: 17°44′48″S 145°44′59″E

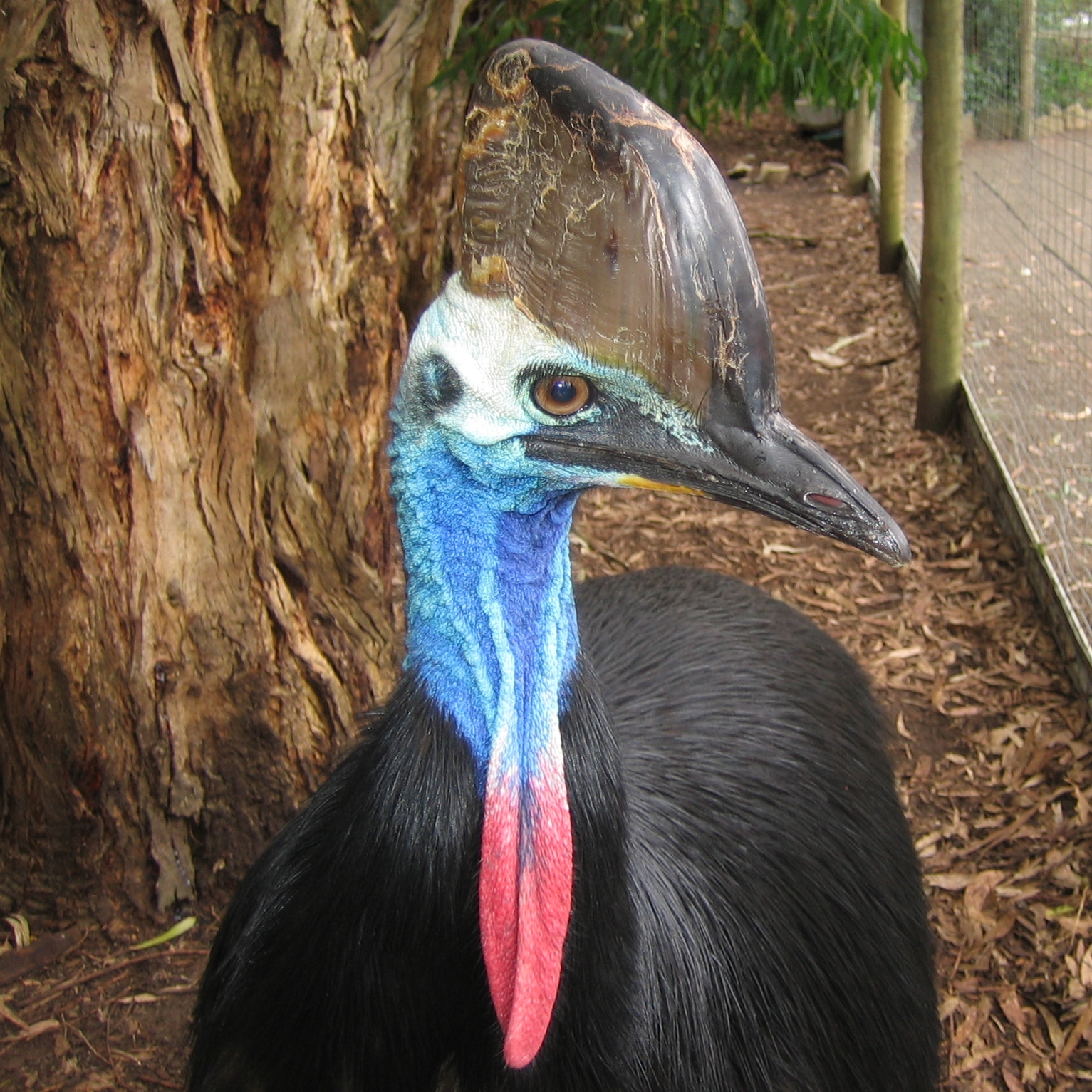
The IBA is an important site for southern cassowaries

The Wooroonooran Important Bird Area comprises some 5125 km^{2} of mainly forested land in the Wet Tropics of Queensland World Heritage Site, of Far North Queensland, Australia.

== Description ==
The site encompasses the largest block of tropical rainforest in Australia, extending from just south of Port Douglas southwards past Cairns to Lucinda. It is dominated by the two granite massifs of Mounts Bartle Frere and Bellenden Ker, rising to about 1600 m and the highest peaks in northern Australia. Much of the area has previously been selectively logged, though the impact of such logging has been relatively minor and its ecological integrity remains largely intact. The site contains, or largely overlaps with, numerous protected areas, including the Barron Gorge, Danbulla, Dinden, Girringun, Japoon, Kirrama, Kuranda, Malaan, Mowbray, Murray Upper, Tully Gorge and Wooroonooran National Parks.

== Wildlife ==
The site has been identified as an Important Bird Area (IBA) by BirdLife International because it supports a population of southern cassowaries. It also contains populations of tooth-billed and golden bowerbirds, lovely fairywrens, Macleay's, bridled and yellow-spotted honeyeaters, fernwrens, Atherton scrubwrens, mountain thornbills, chowchillas, Bower's shrike-thrushes, pied monarchs, Victoria's riflebirds and pale-yellow robins, all of which are endemic to the Queensland Wet Tropics. As well as the birds, the IBA is important for a range of locally endemic fauna including the green, Herbert River and lemur-like ringtail possums, Lumholtz's tree-kangaroo, the northern tinker and neglected frogs, and the bartle frere and stout barsided skinks.
