= Whites Falls =

- Location within Queensland
- Location: Far North Queensland, Australia
- Coordinates: 17°12′00″S 145°50′00″E
- Watercourse: Behana Creek

The Whites Falls, a waterfall on Behana Creek, is in the UNESCO World Heritage–listed Wet Tropics in the Far North region of Queensland, Australia. The falls are above Clamshell Falls in the Wooroonooran National Park.

== See also ==
- List of waterfalls
- List of waterfalls in Australia
