= Clamshell Falls =

- Location within Queensland
- Location: Far North, Queensland, Australia
- Coordinates: 17°11′22″S 145°49′24″E
- Type: Cascade
- Watercourse: Behana Creek

The Clamshell Falls is a cascade waterfall on the Behana Creek, located in Wooroonooran, Cairns Region, Queensland, Australia.

== Location and features ==
The falls are situated in the Wooroonooran National Park and descend down to the Behana Gorge, below the Whites Falls.

== See also ==
- List of waterfalls
- List of waterfalls in Australia
