= Tchupala Falls =

- Location within Queensland
- Location: Far North Queensland, Australia
- Coordinates: 17°36′00″S 145°47′00″E
- Type: Segmented
- Watercourse: Henrietta Creek

The Tchupala Falls, a segmented waterfall on the Henrietta Creek, is located in the UNESCO World Heritage–listed Wet Tropics in the Far North region of Queensland, Australia.

== Location and features ==
The Tchupala Falls are situated in the Palmerston section of Wooroonooran National Park, descending from the Atherton Tableland, approximately 20 kilometres (12 mi) west of Innisfail.

A walking track is accessible via the Palmerston Highway and leads approximately 600 metres (2,000 ft) from the trackhead to the Tchupala Falls. A further return track of approximately 11 kilometres (6.8 mi) leads to Wallicher Falls, Silver Creek Falls and Nandroya Falls. Certain sections of the track may be closed for repairs including the steps down to the lower falls and the track east to Crawford's Lookout.

== See also ==
- List of waterfalls
- List of waterfalls in Australia
