= Josephine Falls =

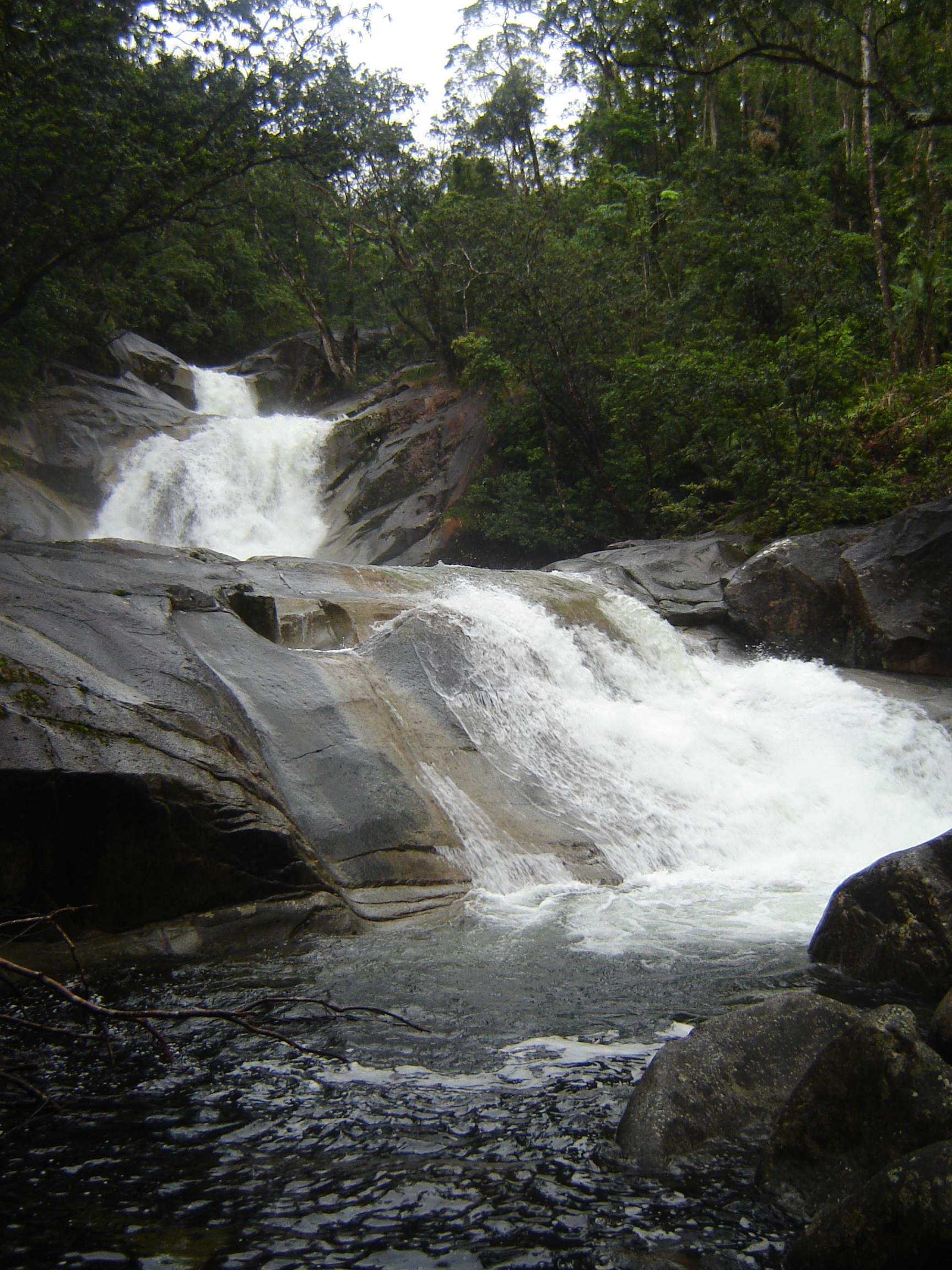
- Josephine Falls

- Location within Queensland
- Location: Far North Queensland, Australia
- Coordinates: 17°25′46″S 145°51′34″E
- Type: Tiered cascade
- Elevation: 192 metres (630 ft) AHD
- Total height: 150–300 metres (490–980 ft)
- Number of drops: 3
- Watercourse: Josephine Creek

The Josephine Falls is a tiered cascade waterfall on the Josephine Creek located in Wooroonooran, Cairns Region in the Far North region of Queensland, Australia.

== Location and features ==
The falls are situated at the foot of the southern face of Mount Bartle Frere in Wooroonooran National Park. They descend from the Atherton Tableland at an elevation of 192 metres (630 ft) above sea level in the range of 150–300 metres (490–980 ft) near a popular recreation site as the water flows over a large rock to form a natural waterslide on Josephine Creek, a tributary of the Russell River.

Access to falls is via a sealed road off the Bruce Highway between Babinda and Innisfail. The natural rock slide can be dangerous and the occasional flash flooding occurs without warning, with a sudden increase in the water volume.

== See also ==
- List of waterfalls
- List of waterfalls in Australia
