= Walshs Pyramid =

Mountain in Australia

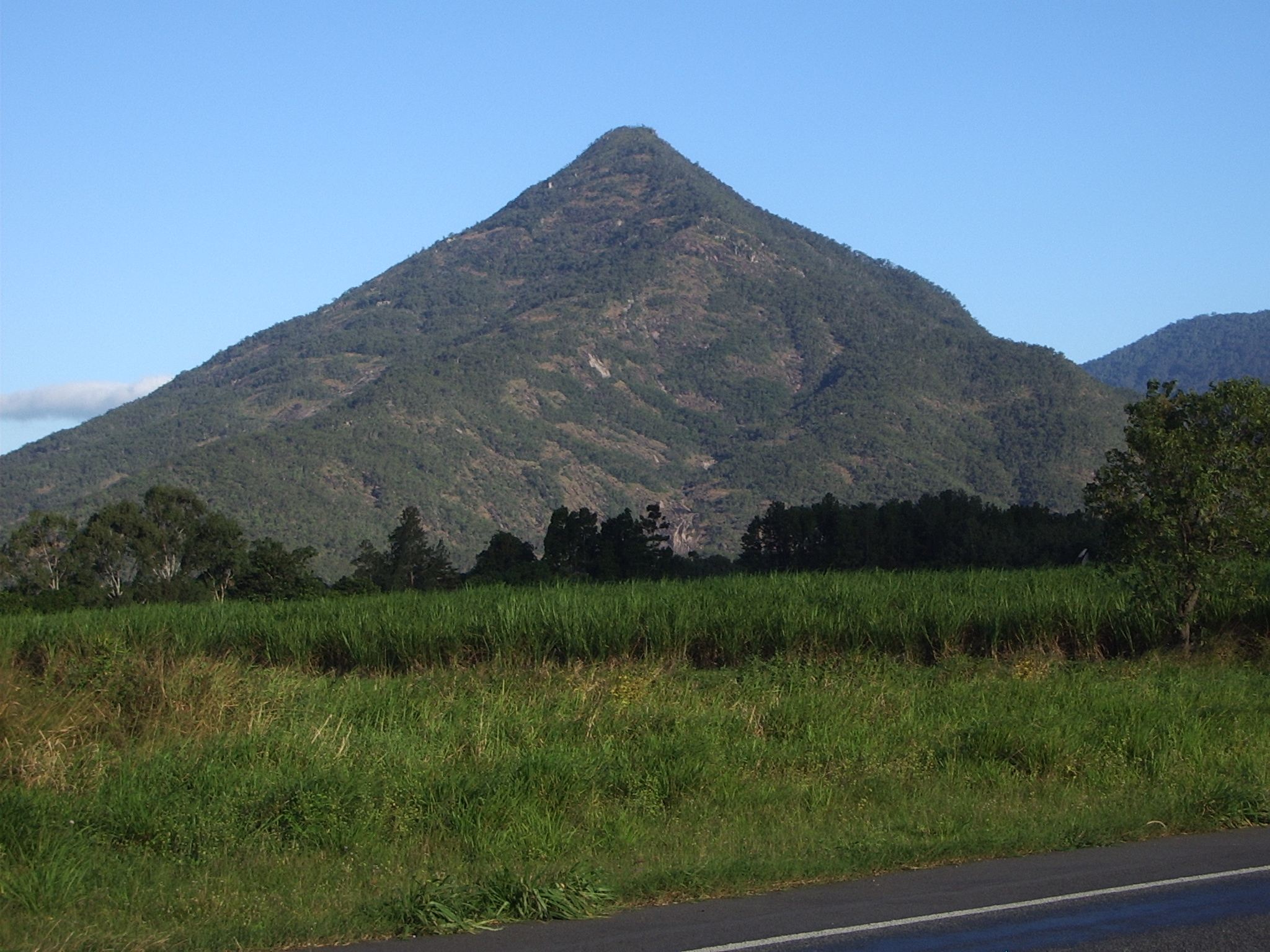

Highest point
- Elevation: 922 m (3,025 ft)
- Coordinates: 17.130025°S 145.800657°E

Geography
- Location: Wooroonooran, Queensland, Australia

Walshs Pyramid is an independent peak with a distinct pyramidal appearance, 922 m (3,025 ft) high, located within Wooroonooran National Park about 20 km (12 mi) south of Cairns, Queensland, Australia. An annual footrace to its summit is held on the third Saturday in August. The "Pyramid race" starts at the nearby town of Gordonvale and attracts hundreds of competitors aiming to win the $1000 prize money.

For experienced hikers, the ascent and descent can take 4 to 6 hours. The vegetation on the mountain is fairly dense however, many rocks are open and exposed which make the surface very slippery after rain.

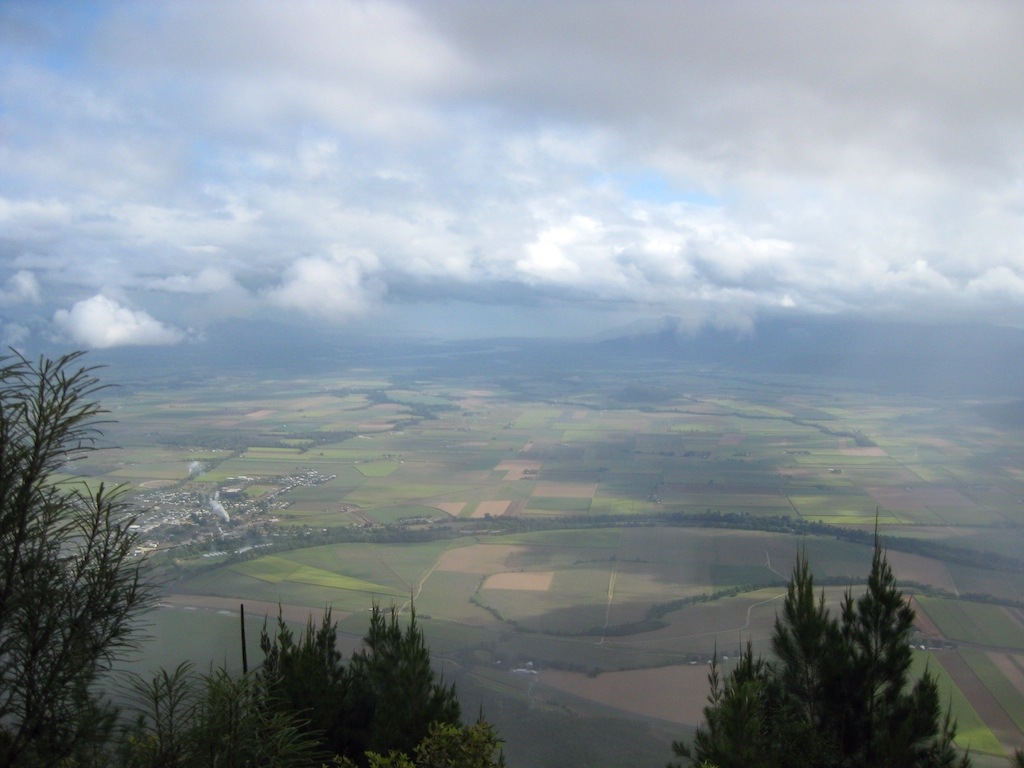
The view from the summit towards Cairns
