= Mount Bartle Frere =

Mountain in Queensland, Australia

- Choorechillum
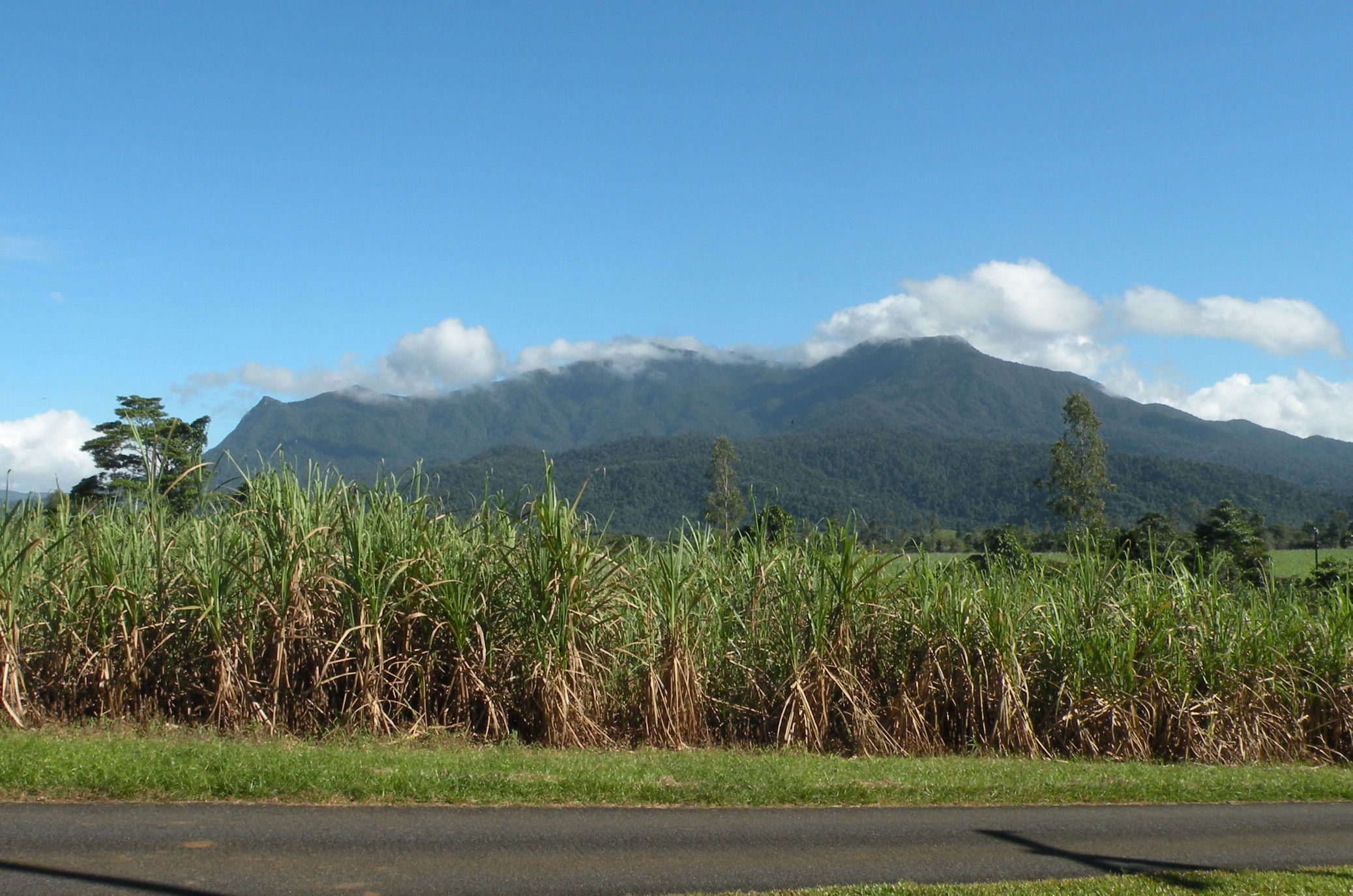
- View from the southeast

Highest point
- Elevation: 1,611 m (5,285 ft)
- Prominence: 1,316 m (4,318 ft)
- Isolation: 882.43 km (548.32 mi)
- Listing: Mountains of Australia
- Coordinates: 17°23′S 145°49′E

Geography
- Location within Queensland
- Country: Australia
- State: Queensland
- Parent range: Bellenden Ker Range

Climbing
- First ascent: Christie Palmerston, 26 October 1886
- Easiest route: Western side

Mount Bartle Frere (/ˈbɑɹtəl frɛə/ BAR-təl FREHR; Ngajanji: Choorechillum) is the highest mountain in Queensland at an elevation of 1,622 metres (5,322 ft). The mountain was named after Sir Henry Bartle Frere, a British colonial administrator and then president of the Royal Geographical Society by George Elphinstone Dalrymple in 1873. Bartle Frere was British Governor of Cape Colony at the outset of the Anglo-Zulu War.

It is located 51 kilometres (32 mi) south of Cairns in Wooroonooran National Park southwest of the town of Babinda on the eastern edge of the Atherton Tablelands. Mount Bartle Frere is part of the Bellenden Ker Range and watershed of the Russell River.

The foothill to summit is entirely covered by rainforest, ranging from typical tropical rainforest in the lowlands to low cloud forest at the cooler summit, where temperatures are up to 10 °C (18 °F) lower than on the coast. Although a treacherous climb, reaching the top offers an expansive view of the surrounding area.

== History ==
The first European to scale the mountain was Christie Palmerston in 1886. He blazed a tree at the summit "'P' October 26,'86.". Its immediate neighbour Mount Bellenden Ker is the second highest mountain in Queensland at 1593 metres.

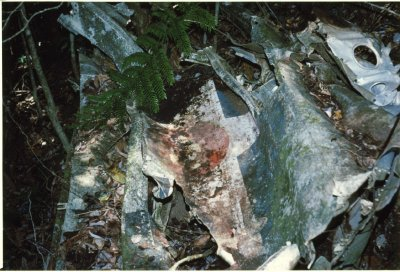
The US "star" insignia is still clearly visible in this 1983 photograph of the wreckage of the crashed bomber on the mountain.

On 21 April 1942 an American Air Corps B-25 Mitchell medium-range bomber (41-12455), from the 3rd Bomb Group, 90th Bomb Squadron, crashed on the mountain with the loss of all seven crew members. This particular aircraft had only recently returned from the Royce Mission against Japanese forces in the Philippines.

== Climbing ==
The summit of Mount Bartle Frere, when it is not covered in cloud, offers the chance to view both the coastal lowlands and the Atherton Tablelands. The climb can be quite steep in places with some rock scrambling required. Sudden weather changes have been known to occur in the area. The ascent to the summit can be quite treacherous and many tourists have become lost, some for several days, while climbing the mountain. The main reasons for this are the unpredictable weather, poor preparation and occasionally obscure track markers. Nonetheless, an experienced climber should have no problem summiting after an early start from the Josephine Falls car park.

The total distance from Josephine Falls is 15 km (9.3 mi) return and would normally take between 10–12 hours. The vertical elevation gained is around 1500 metres. This area of Queensland records several metres of rain every year, so it is not unusual for the peak to be covered in cloud. The best time to climb Bartle Frere is during the dry season (April to October) when the weather is cooler and likelihood of rain is lower. There are yellow markers placed reasonably clearly every kilometre along the trail.

An easier alternative is to approach from a small camp site at the western side. It is reachable by car via Topaz Road and Gourka Road. From this starting point (at an altitude of 700 m), it's relatively easy to complete the climb and descent in a day. It is a favourite with local bushwalking clubs and is best attempted in the dry winter months, from June to October. Walking during the wet season (November to March) brings with it the risks of torrential tropical downpours and poor visibility. Rock slips occur occasionally. Leeches are a hazard at any time of year.

There is a shorter 10 km return trail to 'Broken Nose', a spur feature on the southern side from Josephine Falls. Although there is a large map at the Josephine Falls car park, there are no other maps or ranger station before the climb.

== Environment ==
=== Climate ===
Although no rain gauge exists on the mountain, data at nearby Mount Bellenden Ker suggest an annual average rainfall of around 8,000 millimetres (310 in), and an estimated potential maximum as high as 17,000 mm (670 in), both of which would make the mountain one of the wettest places in the world. Even in what constitutes the "dry" in most of tropical Australia, rainfall on the summit is very heavy at around 800 mm (31 in) in May and 350 mm (14 in) in August, whilst in the wettest month of March estimated averages are as high as 1,800 mm (71 in) and maxima around 6,000 mm (240 in). Calculations based on available lowland data (from Innisfail, Cairns and Port Douglas) would suggest daily rainfalls could have been potentially as high as 2,000 mm (79 in) during a cyclone in 1911 – which if accurate would be the highest daily rainfall in the world.

=== Vegetation ===
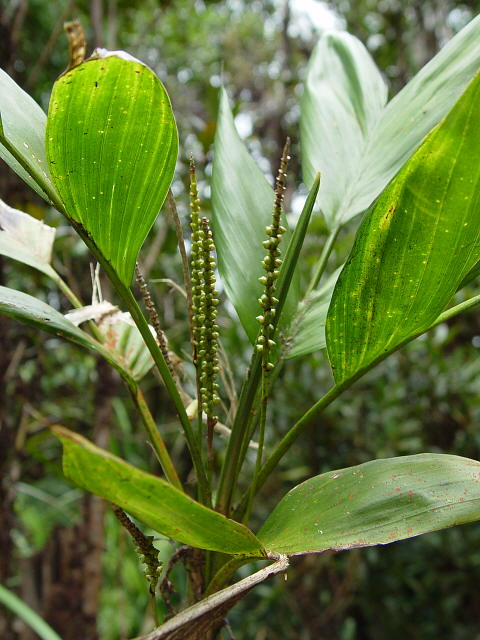
Linospadix palmerianus, a palm species on Mount Bartle Frere

The high elevation and rainfall of the mountain create conditions for a number of vegetation types growing on the poor granitic soils. The lower slopes support lowland tropical rainforest (complex mesophyll vine forest) with a great diversity of large leaved trees, climbers, epiphytes, palms and ferns. With increasing elevation the rainforest changes to a less diverse smaller leaved notophyll type. At elevations above 1000 m, simple microphyll vine fern forest is found with species such as the purple kauri pine (Agathis atropurpurea), Elaeocarpus ferruginiflora and pimple bark (Balanops australiana). With further increases in elevation, increasing exposure and cloud contact create conditions ideal for the formation of cloud forest (simple microphyll vine fern thicket); many of the species are rare or endemic and most trees are shrouded in mosses and other bryophytes.

The stunted tree Eucryphia wilkiei found in the cloud forest above 1,500 m (4,900 ft) elevation on Mount Bartle Frere exists nowhere else on earth and has relatives in the cool temperate rainforests of Tasmania and Chile. Other notable species include the mountain aspen Acronychia chooreechillum, Trochocarpa bellendenkerensis, Polyscias bellendenkerensis, the vine Parsonsia bartlensis and Australia's only native rhododendron, Rhododendron lochiae, which grows on top of the large granite boulders or as an epiphyte in the cloud forest canopy. Eidothea zoexylocarya was initially discovered on the slopes of Mount Bartle Frere, which holds its main populations.

In some areas near the summit the granitic soil is so leached of nutrients by the very high rainfall that rainforest plants are replaced by heath plants such as Acrothamnus spathaceus, Acrotriche baileyana, ferns, (Gleichenia species), carnivorous sundews (Drosera species) and the orchid, Dipodium ensifolium.

=== Fauna ===
The Bartle Frere skink (Techmarscincus jigurru), an endangered species of lizard, is found on the slopes of Mount Bartle Frere and surrounding peaks above 1,400 m (4,600 ft).

Mount Bartle Frere is commemorated in the scientific names of two other species of lizards found on the mountain, Bellatorias frerei and Concinnia frerei.

The mountain lies in the Wooroonooran Important Bird Area, identified as such by BirdLife International because it supports populations of a range of bird species endemic to Queensland's Wet Tropics.
