= Techmarscincus =

Techmarscincus (genus) Bartle Frere skink

Conservation status
- Vulnerable (IUCN 3.1)

Scientific classification
- Kingdom: Animalia
- Phylum: Chordata
- Class: Reptilia
- Order: Squamata
- Family: Scincidae
- Genus: Techmarscincus; Wells & Wellington, 1985
- Species: T. jigurru

Binomial name
- Techmarscincus jigurru (Covacevich, 1984)

Synonyms
- Leiolopisma jigurru Covacevich, 1984; Techmarscincus jigurru — Wells & Wellington, 1985; Bartleia jigurru — Hutchinson et al., 1990; Techmarscincus jigurru — Greer, 2005

Genus of lizards

Techmarscincus is a genus of skink, a lizard in the family Scincidae. The genus is endemic to Australia, and is monotypic, containing the sole species Techmarscincus jigurru.

Techmarscincus jigurru, commonly known as the Bartle Frere skink or Bartle Frere cool-skink, is a species of rare and endangered lizard first discovered in 1981. It was described and named in 1984 by the late Australian herpetologist Jeanette Covacevich.

== Geographic range ==
The Bartle Frere skink is endemic to Mount Bartle Frere in Queensland, Australia.

== Description ==
T. jigurru has a rainbow sheen color. Its body is long and flat, with short limbs and a long tail.

== Behaviour ==
The Bartle Frere skink is agile and energetic. It is only seen out and basking during the day. It spends most of its time on top of exposed granite boulders. A night, it retreats into cracks in the exposed granite. The Bartle Frere skink tolerates juveniles in the same area, as most skinks do not.

== Habitat ==
The Bartle Frere skink occurs at elevations of 1,400 to 1,622 m (4,593 to 5,322 ft) on the top of Mount Bartle Frere. The climate is of a temperate rain forest.

== Reproduction ==
T. jigurru is oviparous.
