= Russell River =

River in Queensland, Australia

Russell
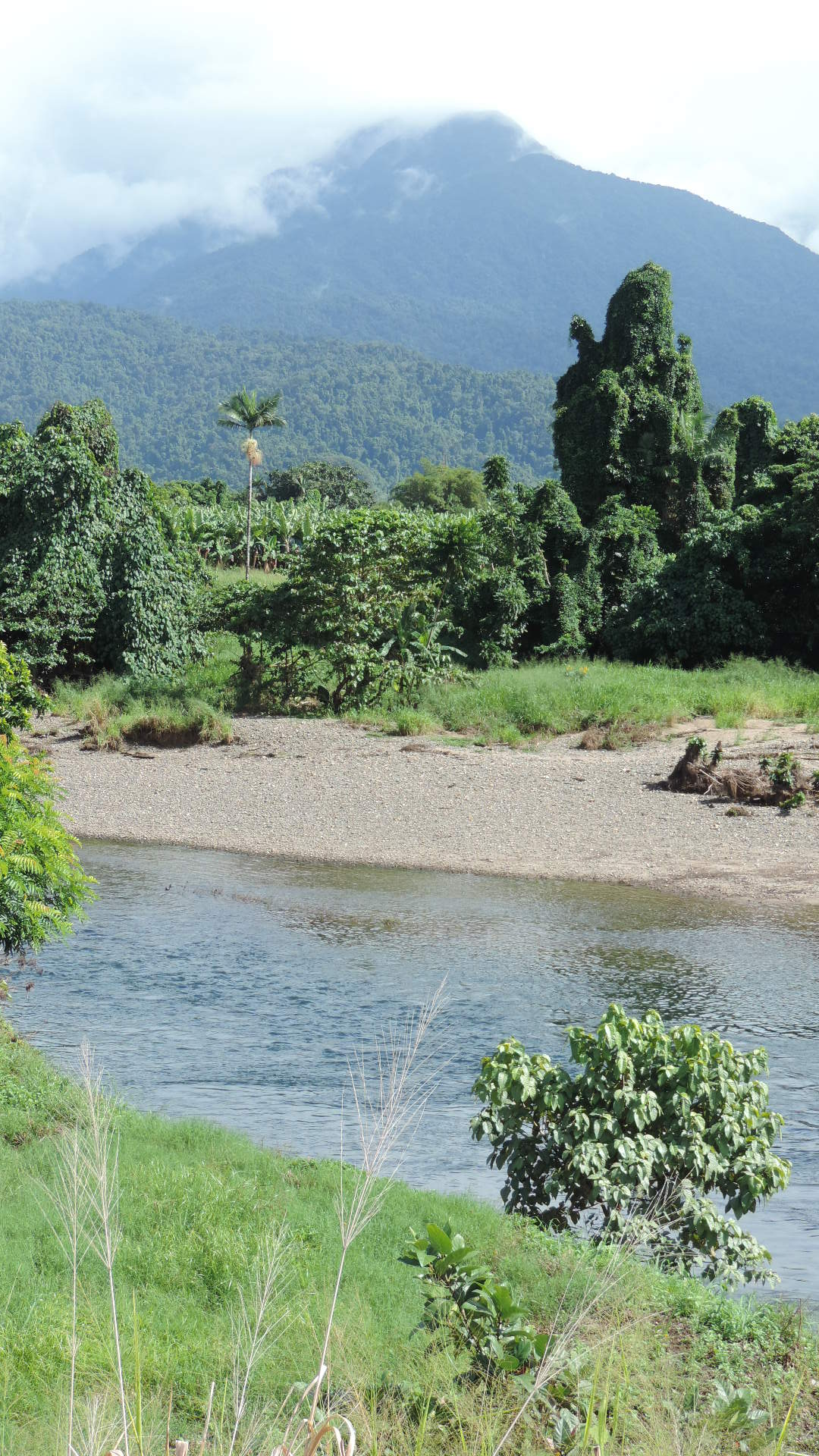
- Russell River, between Woopen Creek (foreground) and Bartle Frere (background), 2018

- Location of Russell River river mouth in Queensland

Location
- Country: Australia
- State: Queensland
- Region: Far North Queensland

Physical characteristics
- Source: Bellenden Ker Range
  - location: east of Topaz
  - coordinates: 17°23′32″S 145°44′36″E
  - elevation: 206 m (676 ft)
- Mouth: confluence with the Mulgrave River
  - location: west of Russell Heads
  - coordinates: 17°13′49″S 145°57′06″E
  - elevation: 0 m (0 ft)
- Length: 59 km (37 mi)
- Basin size: 669 km^{2} (258 sq mi)

Basin features
- River system: Mulgrave River catchment
- Tributaries
  - left: Josephine Creek, Pugh Creek, Harvey Creek
  - right: Coffee Mill Creek (Queensland), Welsh's Creek
- National parks: Wooroonooran National Park; Russell River National Park

The Russell River is a river in Far North Queensland, Australia. The 59-kilometre (37 mi)-long river flows towards the Coral Sea and is located approximately 60 kilometres (37 mi) south of Cairns.

== Location and features ==
The Russell River rises in the Wooroonooran National Park sourced from drainage of the Bellenden Ker Range, below Mount Bartle Frere and Mount Bellenden Ker. In its upper reaches, the course of the river meanders highly as it flows south by east and exits the Wooroonooran National Park. The river flows north by east, joined by the Josephine Creek and it has descended over the Josephine Falls. The river flows east of Babinda and then due north, bounded on both its east and western flanks by the Russell River National Park. The river reaches its confluence with the Mulgrave River in an estuarine state, with the Mulgrave flowing east for a short distance to empty into Coral Sea via the Mutchero Inlet. Water from the river is used to grow sugar cane on the coastal plains surrounding the Russell River's lower reaches.

The Russell River catchment area is estimated to be 669 square kilometres (258 sq mi) of which 68.8 square kilometres (26.6 sq mi) is wetlands. The river descends 206 metres (676 ft) over its 59-kilometre (37 mi) course.

The river is a popular location for whitewater rafting.

With the Mulgrave River, the Russell River has a well recorded flood history with documented evidence of flooding beginning in the late 1930s.

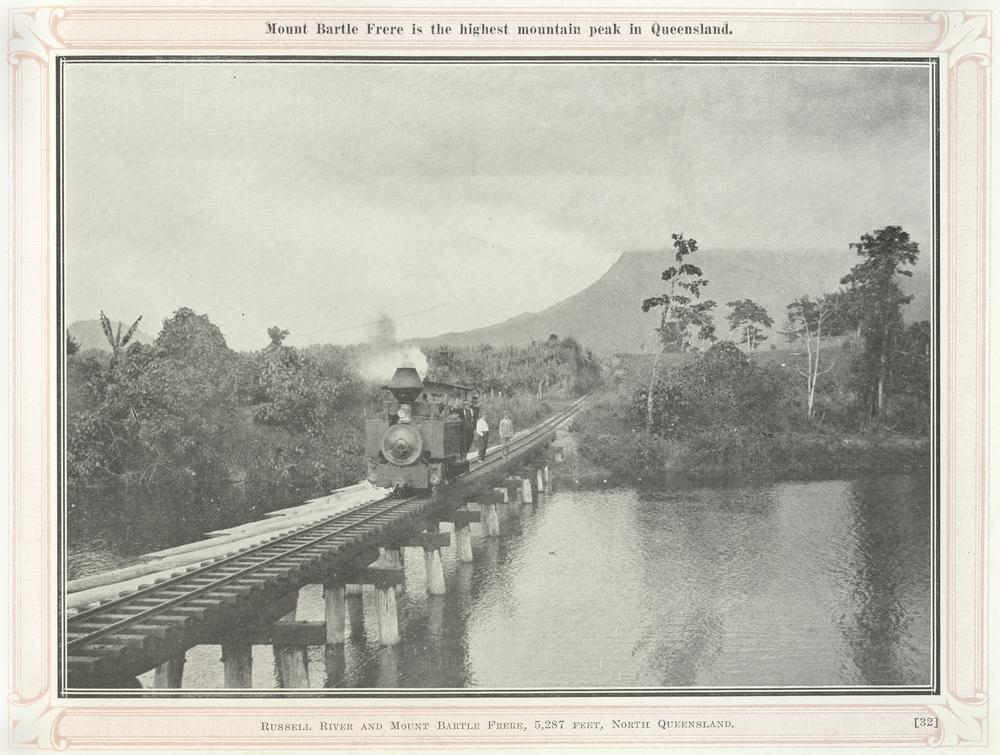
Small steam train crossing the Russell River with Mount Bartle Frere looming in the background, circa 1924

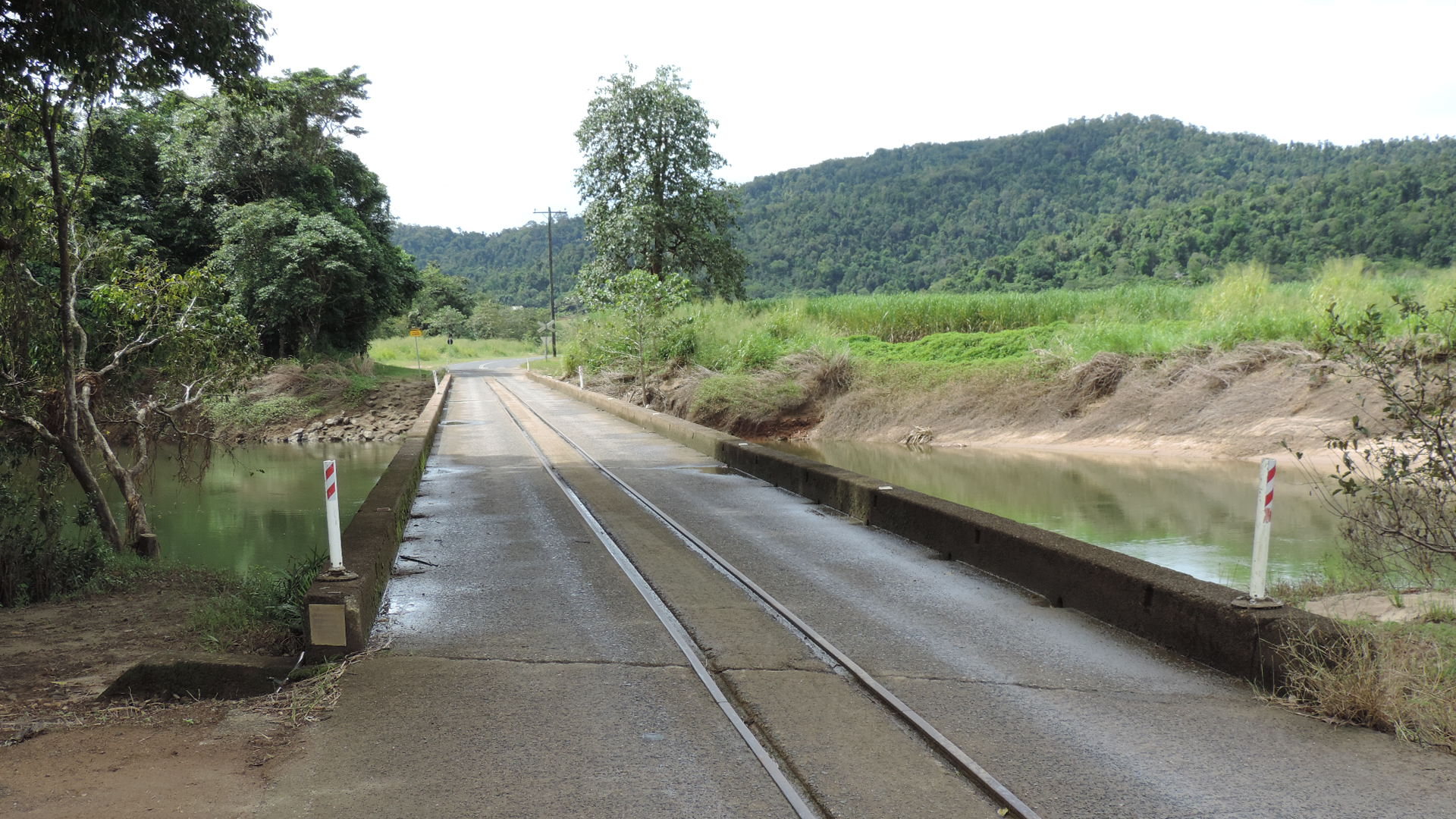
Single-lane road/rail bridge over the Russell River from Babinda to East Russell, 2018

== See also ==
- Rivers of Queensland
