= Mount Bellenden Ker =

Mountain in Queensland, Australia

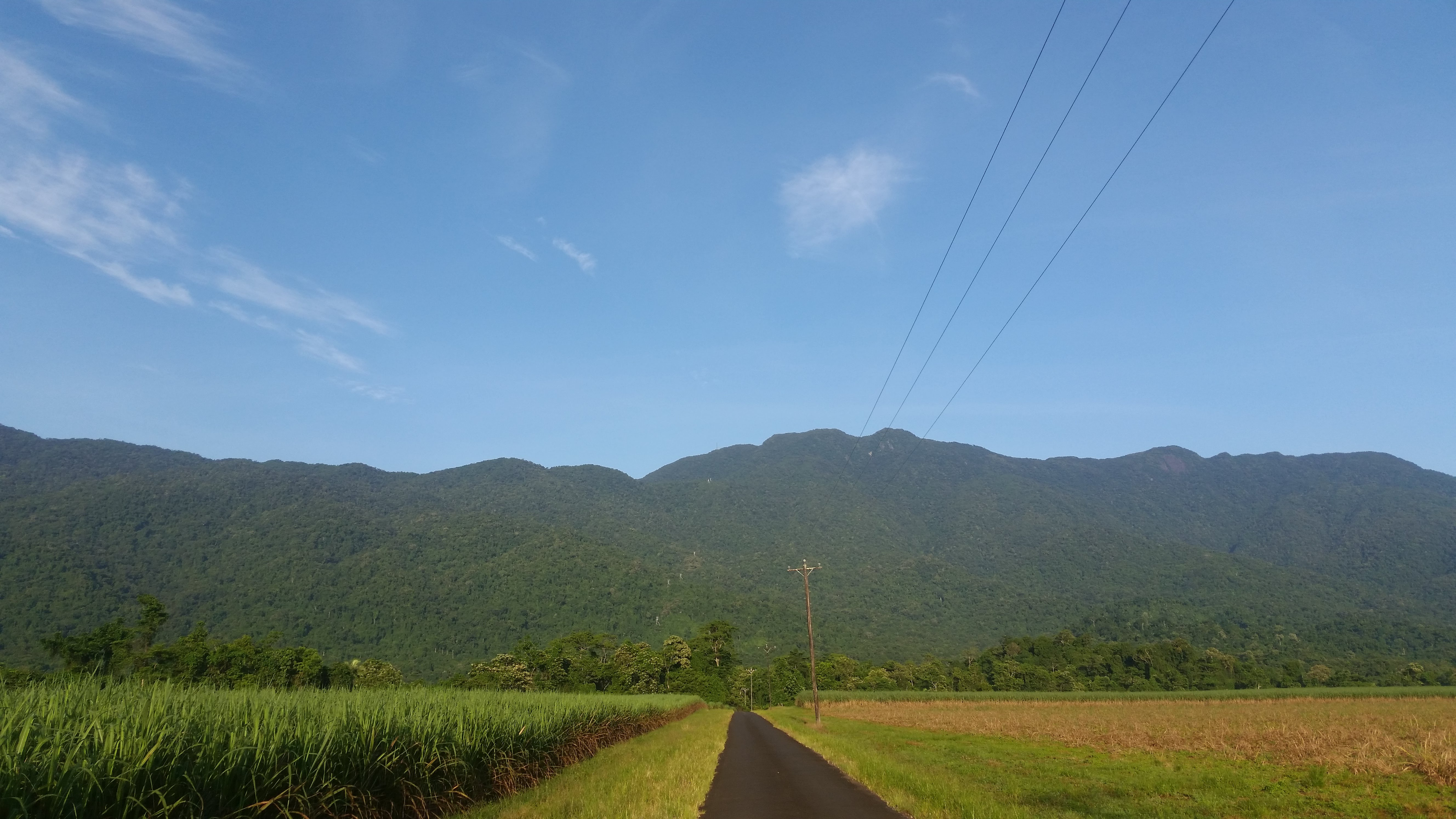
- Mount Bellenden Ker summit and aerial cableway from Bruce Highway

Highest point
- Elevation: 1,593 m (5,226 ft)
- Prominence: 1,222 m (4,009 ft)
- Coordinates: 17°15′51″S 145°51′14″E

Geography
- Location within Queensland
- Location: Queensland, Australia
- Parent range: Bellenden Ker Range

Mount Bellenden Ker is the second-highest mountain in Queensland, Australia, with a height of 1,593 metres (5,226 ft). It is named after the botanist John Bellenden Ker Gawler. Located 39 km (24 mi) south of Cairns, and near Babinda, it is adjacent to Mount Bartle Frere, the state's highest peak, part of the Bellenden Ker Range, also known as the Wooroonooran Range. The two mountains dominate the Josephine Falls section of the Wooroonooran National Park. Both peaks are made of resistant granite and are remnants of an escarpment that has been eroded by the Russell and Mulgrave Rivers.

The mountain's summit is the rainiest part of Australia. Several television transmitter towers have been built on the mountain. The only access to the television transmitter site and the mountain top weather station is by a privately owned cable car.

== History ==
In 1873, Walter Hill, Queensland's first Colonial botanist, undertook an expedition to northern Queensland to collect native plants and included a trip to Mount Bellenden Ker. In the same year Robert Arthur Johnstone climbed the peak while exploring the coastal lands south of Cooktown with George Elphinstone Dalrymple. Another expedition to the summit, led by Archibald Meston, was conducted in early February to early March 1889.

== Environment ==
The forest canopy on Bellenden Ker is an example of a cloud forest, with high biodiversity and its frequent cloud cover and fog.

=== Birds ===
The mountain lies in the Wooroonooran Important Bird Area, identified as such by BirdLife International because it supports populations of a range of bird species endemic to Queensland's Wet Tropics.

== Climate ==
The rain gauge at its summit records an annual average rainfall of 8,053.6 mm (317.07 in), making it the wettest meteorological station in Australia. It also holds the record for the highest rainfall in a calendar year of 12,461 mm (490.6 in) in 2000 and the highest rainfall in Australia for a calendar month of 5,387 mm (212.1 in) in January 1979.

In 2006, the mountain received more rainfall – 9,800 mm (390 in) – than any other part of Australia. This was primarily due to two severe tropical cyclones passing close to the mountain. In 2010, Queensland's wettest year on record, the top station on the mountain recorded 12,438.4 mm (489.70 in), just under the 2000 record.

Climate data for Mount Bellenden Ker (top station); elevation: 1,545 metres (5,069 ft)
Month	Jan	Feb	Mar	Apr	May	Jun	Jul	Aug	Sep	Oct	Nov	Dec	Year
Average rainfall mm (inches)	996.9 (39.25)	1,201.7 (47.31)	1,304.4 (51.35)	1,082.5 (42.62)	784.1 (30.87)	457.2 (18.00)	402.0 (15.83)	309.8 (12.20)	279.1 (10.99)	340.1 (13.39)	367.4 (14.46)	564.7 (22.23)	8,053.6 (317.07)
Source: Bureau of Meteorology

Climate data for Mount Bellenden Ker (bottom station); elevation: 97 metres (318 ft)
Month	Jan	Feb	Mar	Apr	May	Jun	Jul	Aug	Sep	Oct	Nov	Dec	Year
Average rainfall mm (inches)	675.8 (26.61)	830.7 (32.70)	813.9 (32.04)	582.0 (22.91)	339.0 (13.35)	177.5 (6.99)	137.4 (5.41)	121.6 (4.79)	136.1 (5.36)	167.4 (6.59)	276.9 (10.90)	380.3 (14.97)	4,546.3 (178.99)
Source: Bureau of Meteorology

== See also ==
- Big Bog, Maui
- Cherrapunji
- List of mountains in Australia
- Mount Waialeale
- Quibdó
- Rainfall § Wettest known locations
