= Shire of Cardwell =

Coordinates: 17°55′58″S 145°55′27″E

- Local government area
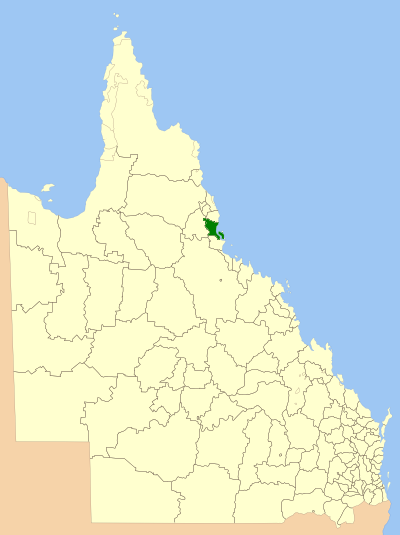
- Location within Queensland

- Country: Australia
- State: Queensland
- Region: Far North Queensland
- Established: 1884
- Council seat: Tully

Area
  - Total: 3,062.2 km^{2} (1,182.3 sq mi)

Population
  - Total: 9,529 (2006 census)
  - Density: 3.11182/km^{2} (8.0596/sq mi)
LGAs around Shire of Cardwell
Herberton	Johnstone	Coral Sea
Herberton	Shire of Cardwell	Coral Sea
Herberton	Hinchinbrook	Coral Sea

The Shire of Cardwell was a local government area of Queensland. It was located on the Coral Sea coast about halfway between the cities of Cairns and Townsville. The shire, administered from the town of Tully, covered an area of 3,062.2 square kilometres (1,182.3 sq mi), and existed as a local government entity from 1884 until 2008, when it amalgamated with the Shire of Johnstone to form the Cassowary Coast Region.

The shire also had responsibility for some Great Barrier Reef islands, including Dunk Island, Goold Island and Hinchinbrook Island.

The area's economy is based on agriculture, in particular sugar and bananas, and tourism. Part of the Wet Tropics of Queensland and Great Barrier Reef World Heritage Sites are located in Cardwell Shire.

== History ==
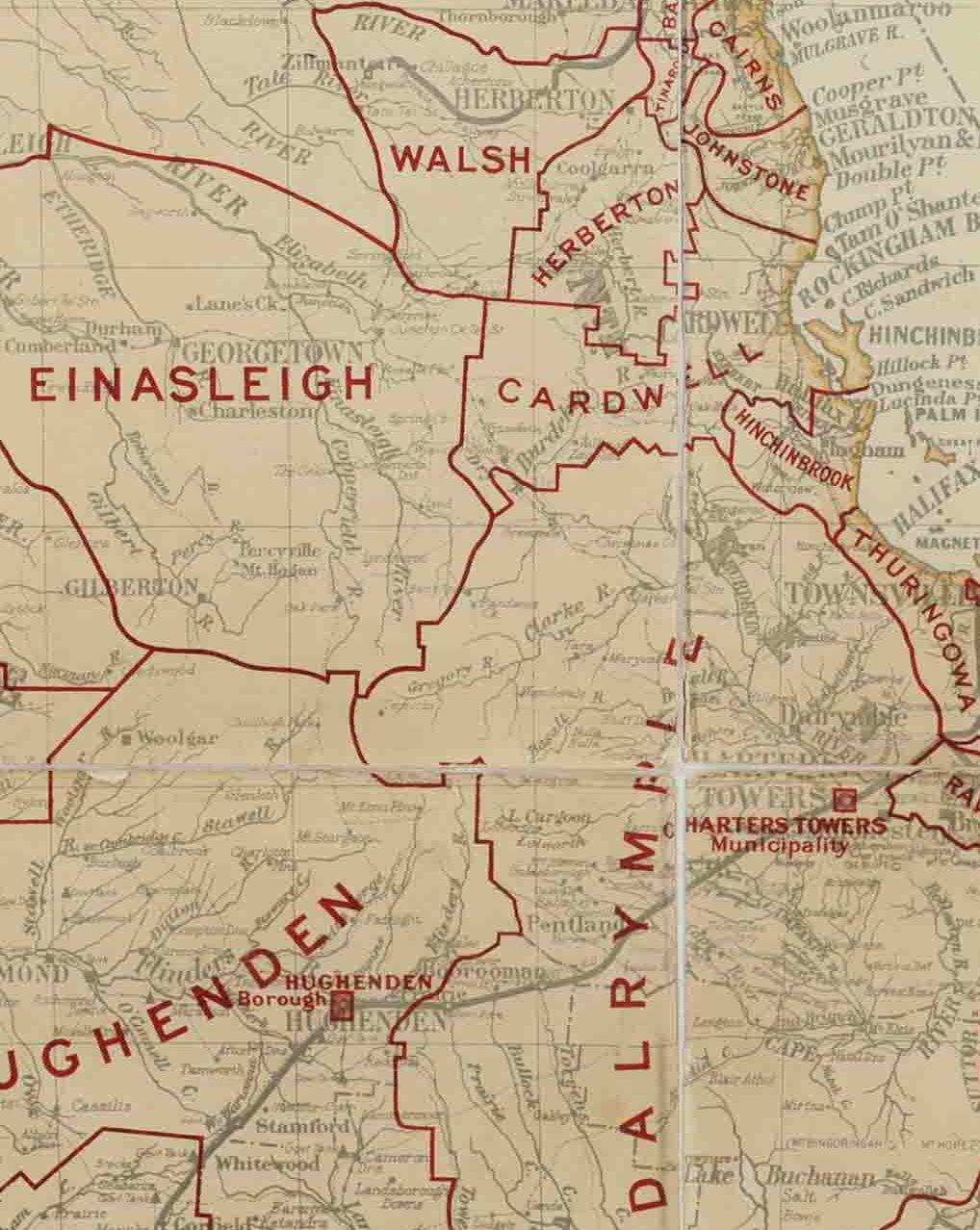
Map of Cardwell Division and adjacent local government areas, March 1902

The Hinchinbrook Division was created on 11 November 1879 as one of 74 divisions around Queensland under the Divisional Boards Act 1879. On 18 January 1884, part of the Hinchinbrook Division was separated to create the new Cardwell Division.

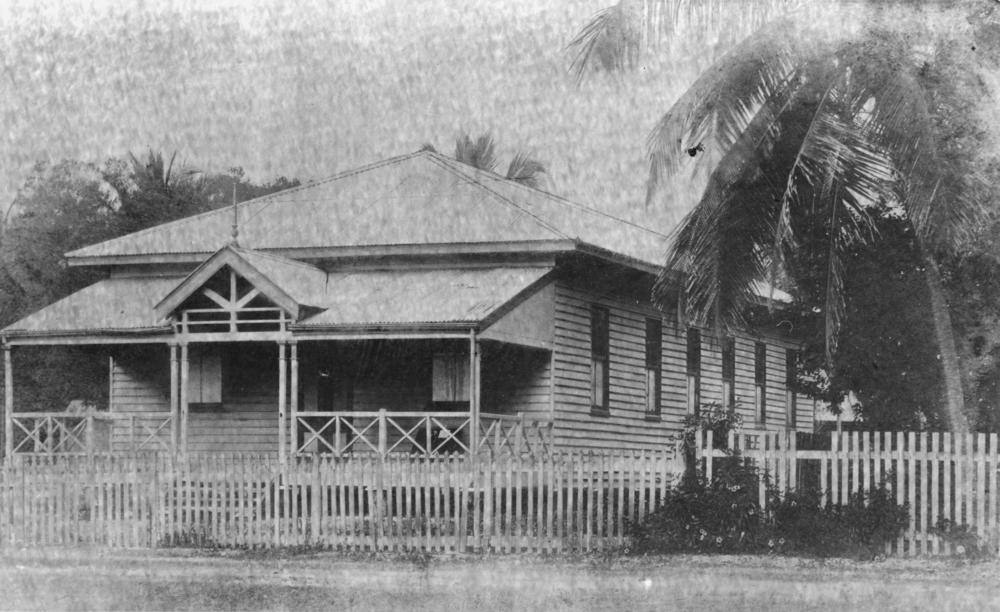
Cardwell Divisional Board Hall (later Cardwell Shire Council Chambers), Cardwell, 1911

In 1892, the Cardwell Divisional Board built the Cardwell Divisional Board Hall (now heritage-listed) at 51 Victoria Street, Cardwell. At that time, Cardwell was regarded as the major town in the division (as reflected in the division's name).

With the passage of the Local Authorities Act 1902, Cardwell Division became the Shire of Cardwell on 31 March 1903. The divisional board hall then became known as the Cardwell Shire Council Chambers.

To commemorate those who served in World War I, an honour board was erected in the Cardwell Shire Council Chambers in 1922. Composed of marble, it lists 26 servicemen and 2 nurses from the local community. The inclusion of nurses is such a memorial is relatively uncommon.

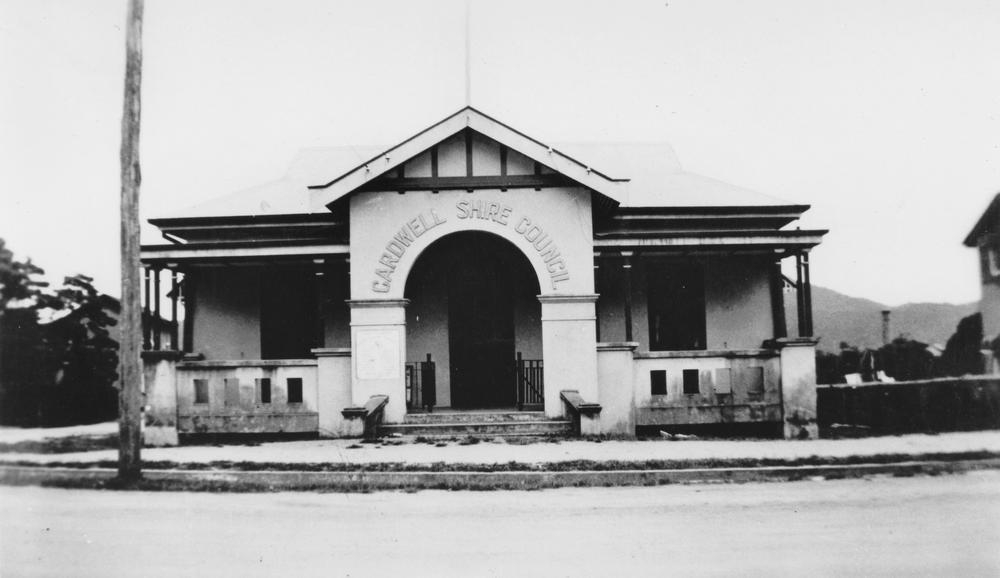
Cardwell Shire Council Chambers, Tully, circa 1930

In 1929, the decision was taken to relocate the shire council's headquarters to the newer but more populous town of Tully. The first council meeting held in Tully was on 27 June 1929. A new shire chambers was built in 1930 on the south-east corner of Bryant and Morris Streets in Tully. The former shire chambers in Cardwell was then used by the Queensland Country Women's Association (QCWA) and later by the Returned Sailors' Soldiers' and Airmen's Imperial League of Australia (RSSAILA). From 1989 to 2008, the building was used as a library. Later it became the J. C. Hubinger Memorial Museum. The presence of the honour board means that the building has been the community focus for Anzac Day ceremonies throughout the years. Given its historical and cultural significance, the building was listed on the Queensland Heritage Register on 21 March 2013.

In 1978, the shire chambers in Tully were replaced with the present council chambers.

On 15 March 2008, under the Local Government (Reform Implementation) Act 2007 passed by the Parliament of Queensland on 10 August 2007, the Shire of Cardwell merged with the Shire of Johnstone (also formerly part of the Hinchinbrook Division) to form the Cassowary Coast Region.

== Towns and localities ==
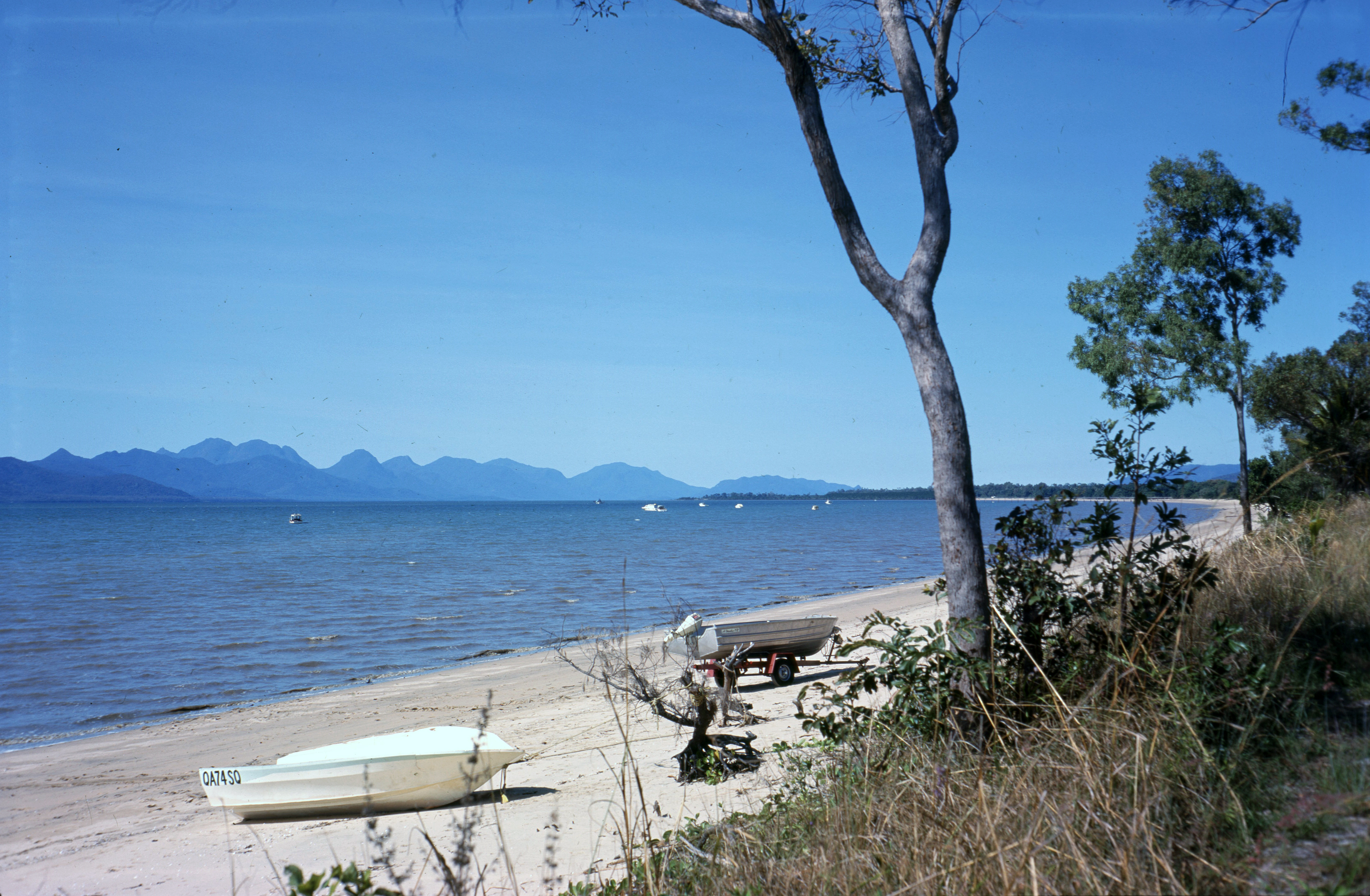
Shire of Cardwell, 1976

The Shire of Cardwell included the following settlements:

Greater Tully area:

- Tully
  - Birkalla
  - Silky Oak

Localities:

- Cardwell
- Bilyana
- Bulgun
- Cardstone
- Carmoo
- Coquette Point
- Damper Creek
- Djiru
- Ellerbeck
- Euramo
- Feluga
- Hull Heads
- Jarra Creek
- Jumbun
- Kennedy
- Lower Tully
- Merryburn
- Midgenoo
- Murray Upper
- Murrigal
- Rockingham
- South Mission Beach
- Tully Heads
- Wongaling Beach

== Population ==
Year	Population
1933	4,416
1947	4,346
1954	5,045
1961	5,183
1966	5,640
1971	5,736
1976	6,478
1981	7,853
1986	8,666
1991	9,882
1996	10,130
2001	10,634
2006	10,584

== Chairmen ==
- 1884: James Thorn Senior
- 1902: Peter Smith
- 1903—1904: Johann Christian Hubinger (chairman 15 times)
- 1908: Johann Christian Hubinger (again, but died September 1908)
- 1909: Mr Hubinger
- 1910: Mr Kennedy
- 1914: Mr Stamp
- 1915: Arthur Henry
- 1921—1924: Brice Henry
- 1924—1931: James Thorn
- 1931—1933: Julius August Winter
- 1933—1936: Chris Teitzel
- 1936—1940: Brice Henry (died February 1940)
- 1940: P. White
- 1943—1954: Charles Dickinson
- 1985—1991: Atte Raccanello (first and only female council leader)
- 2004—2008: Giuseppe (Joe) Galeano

Gladys Henry was the first female council member, serving between 1976 and 1982.
