= Kooroomool, Queensland =

Kooroomool
- Suburb
- Interactive map of Kooroomool
- Coordinates: 17.9308°S 145.7163°E
- Country: Australia
- State: Queensland
- LGA: Cassowary Coast Region
- Location: 43.9 km (27.3 mi) WSW of Tully; 94.9 km (59.0 mi) SW of Innisfail; 182 km (113 mi) S of Cairns; 187 km (116 mi) S of Atherton; 1,578 km (981 mi) NNW of Brisbane

Government
  - State electorate: Hinchinbrook
  - Federal division: Kennedy

Area
  - Total: 253.0 km^{2} (97.7 sq mi)

Population
  - Total: 0 (2021 census)
  - Density: 0.0000/km^{2} (0.000/sq mi)
- Time zone: UTC+10:00 (AEST)
- Postcode: 4854
Suburbs around Kooroomool
Ravenshoe; Millstream	Maalan; Palmerston	Gulngai; Walter Hill
Innot Hot Springs	Kooroomool	Cardstone
Glen Ruth	Kirrama; Murray Upper	Munro Plains

Kooroomool is a rural locality in the Cassowary Coast Region, Queensland, Australia. In the 2021 census, Kooroomool had "no people or a very low population".

== Geography ==
Most of Kooroomool is within the Tully Gorge National Park, except for a small portion in the north-west of the locality which is within the Koombooloomba National Park.

Kooroomool has the following mountains:

- Mount Kooroomool (17.8414°S 145.6802°E) 925 metres (3,035 ft)
- Mount Theodore (17.7779°S 145.6171°E) 895 metres (2,936 ft)

== Demographics ==
In both the 2016 census and 2021 census; Kooroomool had "no people or a very low population".

== Education ==
There are no schools in Kooroomool. The nearest government primary schools are Ravenshoe State School in Ravenshoe to the north-west, Tully State School in Tully to the east, and Murray River Upper State School in neighbouring Murray Upper to the south-east. The nearest government secondary school is Tully State High School in Tully to the east.
