= P. petiolaris =

P. petiolaris may refer to:

- Pedicularis petiolaris, a species in the genus Pedicularis
- Pleurothallis petiolaris, a species in the genus Pleurothallis
- Pultenaea petiolaris, a species in the genus Pultenaea

== See also ==
- Petiolaris (disambiguation)
