= Warrami, Queensland =

Warrami
- Suburb
- Interactive map of Warrami
- Coordinates: 18.04°S 145.7922°E
- Country: Australia
- State: Queensland
- LGA: Cassowary Coast Region
- Location: 35.4 km (22.0 mi) SW of Tully; 86.3 km (53.6 mi) SSW of Innisfail; 174 km (108 mi) S of Cairns; 205 km (127 mi) NNW of Townsville; 1,697 km (1,054 mi) NNW of Brisbane

Government
  - State electorate: Hinchinbrook
  - Federal division: Kennedy

Area
  - Total: 105.7 km^{2} (40.8 sq mi)

Population
  - Total: 39 (2021 census)
  - Density: 0.369/km^{2} (0.956/sq mi)
- Time zone: UTC+10:00 (AEST)
- Postcode: 4854
Suburbs around Warrami
Munro Plains	Munro Plains	Munro Plains
Murray Upper	Warrami	Murray Upper
Murray Upper	Murray Upper	Murray Upper

Warrami is a rural locality in the Cassowary Coast Region, Queensland, Australia. In the 2021 census, Warrami had a population of 39 people.

== Geography ==
The Murray River forms the southern and south-eastern boundary of the locality, while its tributary the North Murray River forms the south-western boundary.

The land use is predominantly crop growing (mostly sugarcane) with some grazing on native vegetation. There is a network of cane tramways to transport the harvested sugarcane to the local sugar mill.

== Demographics ==
In the 2016 census, Warrami had a population of 54 people.

In the 2021 census, Warrami had a population of 39 people.

== Education ==
There are no schools in Warrami. The nearest government primary school is Murray River Upper State School in neighbouring Murray Upper to the south-east. The nearest government secondary school is Tully State High School in Tully to the north-east. There is also a Catholic primary school in Tully.
