= Munro Plains, Queensland =

Munro Plains
- Suburb
- Interactive map of Munro Plains
- Coordinates: 17.9661°S 145.7727°E
- Country: Australia
- State: Queensland
- LGA: Cassowary Coast Region
- Location: 32.7 km (20.3 mi) W of Tully; 84.3 km (52.4 mi) SSW of Innisfail; 171 km (106 mi) S of Cairns; 224 km (139 mi) NNW of Townsville; 1,573 km (977 mi) NNW of Brisbane

Government
  - State electorate: Hinchinbrook
  - Federal division: Kennedy

Area
  - Total: 101.4 km^{2} (39.2 sq mi)

Population
  - Total: 74 (2021 census)
  - Density: 0.730/km^{2} (1.890/sq mi)
- Time zone: UTC+10:00 (AEST)
- Postcode: 4854
Suburbs around Munro Plains
Cardstone	Dingo Pocket	Jarra Creek
Kooroomool	Munro Plains	Euramo
Kooroomool	Warrami	Murray Upper

Munro Plains is a rural locality in the Cassowary Coast Region, Queensland, Australia. In the 2021 census, Munro Plains had a population of 74 people.

== Geography ==
Jarum Conservation Park is in the south-east of the locality. Apart from this protected area, the land use is predominantly crop growing (mostly sugarcane) with some grazing on native vegetation. There is a cane tramway in the south-east of the locality to transport the harvested sugarcane to the local sugar mill.

== Demographics ==
In the 2016 census, Munro Plains had a population of 74 people.

In the 2021 census, Munro Plains had a population of 74 people.

== Education ==
There are no schools in Munro Plains. The nearest government primary school is Murray River Upper State School in neighbouring Murray Upper to the south-east. The nearest government secondary school is Tully State High School in Tully to the east.
