= Dingo Pocket, Queensland =

Dingo Pocket
- Suburb
- Interactive map of Dingo Pocket
- Coordinates: 17.93°S 145.8069°E
- Country: Australia
- State: Queensland
- LGA: Cassowary Coast Region
- Location: 17.9 km (11.1 mi) NW of Tully; 71.1 km (44.2 mi) SW of Innisfail; 159 km (99 mi) S of Cairns; 223 km (139 mi) NNW of Townsville; 1,573 km (977 mi) NNW of Brisbane

Government
  - State electorate: Hinchinbrook
  - Federal division: Kennedy

Area
  - Total: 45.1 km^{2} (17.4 sq mi)

Population
  - Total: 79 (2021 census)
  - Density: 1.752/km^{2} (4.54/sq mi)
- Time zone: UTC+10:00 (AEST)
- Postcode: 4854
Suburbs around Dingo Pocket
Cardstone	Walter Hill	Jarra Creek
Munro Plains	Dingo Pocket	Jarra Creek
Munro Plains	Munro Plains	Jarra Creek

Dingo Pocket is a rural locality in the Cassowary Coast Region, Queensland, Australia. In the 2021 census, Dingo Pocket had a population of 79 people.

== Geography ==
The Tully River forms the western boundary of the locality.

The land use is a mixture of crop growing (sugarcane and tropical fruit) on the flatter land with grazing on native vegetation on the hilly terrain.

== Demographics ==
In the 2016 census, Dingo Pocket had a population of 89 people.

In the 2021 census, Dingo Pocket had a population of 79 people.

== Education ==
There are no schools in Dingo Pocket. The nearest government primary and secondary schools are Tully State School and Tully State High School, both in Tully to the east.
