= Rockingham, Queensland =

Rockingham
- Town
- Interactive map of Rockingham
- Coordinates: 18.0102°S 145.9902°E
- Country: Australia
- State: Queensland
- LGA: Cassowary Coast Region
- Location: 13.7 km (8.5 mi) SE of Tully; 64.6 km (40.1 mi) S of Innisfail; 152 km (94 mi) S of Cairns; 205 km (127 mi) NNW of Townsville; 1,618 km (1,005 mi) NNW of Brisbane

Government
  - State electorate: Hinchinbrook
  - Federal division: Kennedy

Area
  - Total: 127.0 km^{2} (49.0 sq mi)

Population
  - Total: 104 (2021 census)
  - Density: 0.819/km^{2} (2.121/sq mi)
- Time zone: UTC+10:00 (AEST)
- Postcode: 4854
Localities around Rockingham
| Euramo; Silky Oak | Lower Tully | Tully Heads |
| Murrigal | Rockingham | Coral Sea |
| Bilyana | Bilyana | Bilyana |

Rockingham is a rural town and coastal locality in the Cassowary Coast Region, Queensland, Australia. In the 2021 census, the locality of Rockingham had a population of 104 people.

== Geography ==
The locality is bounded to the north by the Tully River, to the east by Rockingham Bay, and to the south by the Murray River. The town lies in the far north of the locality on the southern bank of the Tully River; there are only a few houses in the town.

All of the land along the coastline is part of the Gulngay National Park.

The remainder of the locality is used for agriculture, mostly the growing of sugarcane with some grazing on native vegetation.

== History ==
The bay takes its name from Rockingham Bay, which in turn was named on 8 June 1770 by Lieutenant James Cook of HMS Endeavour, after Charles Watson-Wentworth, 2nd Marquess of Rockingham and a former British Prime Minister.

The town was surveyed in 1883 by surveyor Cecil Twisden Bedford.

== Demographics ==
In the 2016 census, the locality of Rockingham had a population of 107 people.

In the 2021 census, the locality of Rockingham had a population of 104 people.

== Education ==
There are no schools in Rockingham. The nearest government primary schools are Lower Tully State School in neighbouring Lower Tully to the north, Tully State School in Tully to the north-west, and Murray River Upper State School in Murray Upper to the south-west. The nearest government secondary school is Tully State High School in Tully.
