= Jarra Creek, Queensland =

Jarra Creek
- Suburb
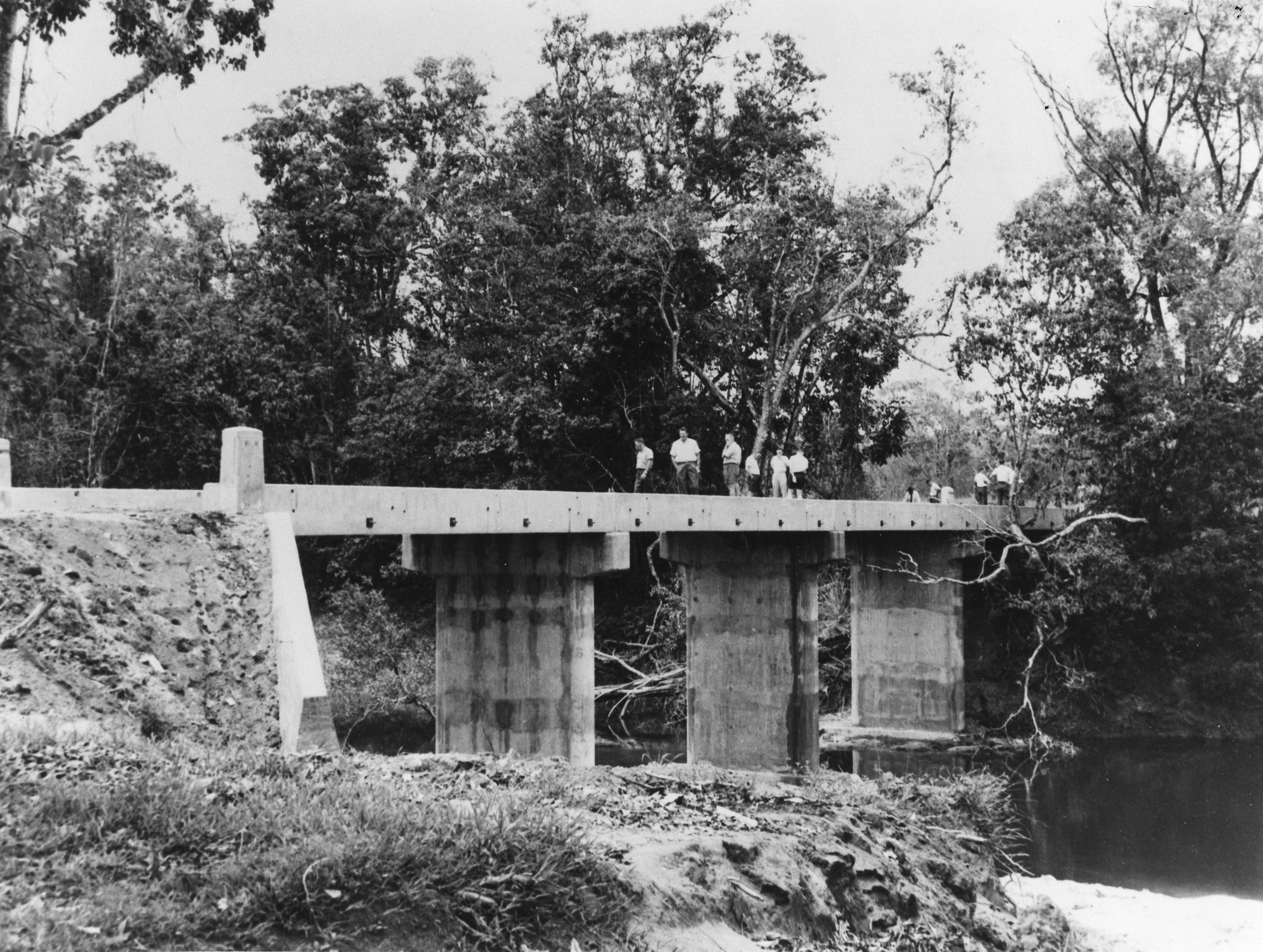
- Jarra Creek Bridge, where Tully Gorge Road crosses Jarra Creek, circa 1950

- Interactive map of Jarra Creek
- Coordinates: 17.9305°S 145.8775°E
- Country: Australia
- State: Queensland
- LGA: Cassowary Coast Region
- Location: 5.2 km (3.2 mi) WSW of Tully; 58.6 km (36.4 mi) SSW of Innisfail; 146 km (91 mi) S of Cairns; 210 km (130 mi) NW of Townsville; 1,679 km (1,043 mi) NNW of Brisbane

Government
  - State electorate: Hinchinbrook
  - Federal division: Kennedy

Area
  - Total: 63.2 km^{2} (24.4 sq mi)

Population
  - Total: 105 (2021 census)
  - Density: 1.661/km^{2} (4.303/sq mi)
- Time zone: UTC+10:00 (AEST)
- Postcode: 4854
Suburbs around Jarra Creek
Walter Hill	Walter Hill	Tully
Dingo Pocket	Jarra Creek	Silky Oak
Munro Plains	Euramo	Euramo

Jarra Creek is a rural locality in the Cassowary Coast Region, Queensland, Australia. In the 2021 census, Jarra Creek had a population of 105 people.

== Geography ==
The locality is bounded to the south by the Tully River. The creek Jara Creek rises in neighbouring Walter Hill to the north-west and flows into the locality of Jarra Creek on its north-western boundary, becoming a tributary of the Tully River in the south-west boundary of the locality.

The land use is predominantly crop growing, mostly sugarcane with some banana plantations. There is also some grazing on native vegetation.

Tully Gorge Road enters the locality from north-east (Tully). It forms part of the locality's northern boundary before turning west and exiting the locality to north-west (Dingo Pocket / Walter Hill). There is also a cane tramway network in the locality to transport the harvested sugarcane to the Tully sugar mill in Tully.

== History ==
The locality was officially named and bounded in 2000.

== Demographics ==
In the 2016 census, Jarra Creek had a population of 134 people.

In the 2021 census, Jarra Creek had a population of 105 people.

== Education ==
There are no schools in Jarra Creek. The nearest government primary and secondary schools are Tully State School and Tully State High School, both in neighbouring Tully to the north-east.
