= Murrigal, Queensland =

Murrigal
- Suburb
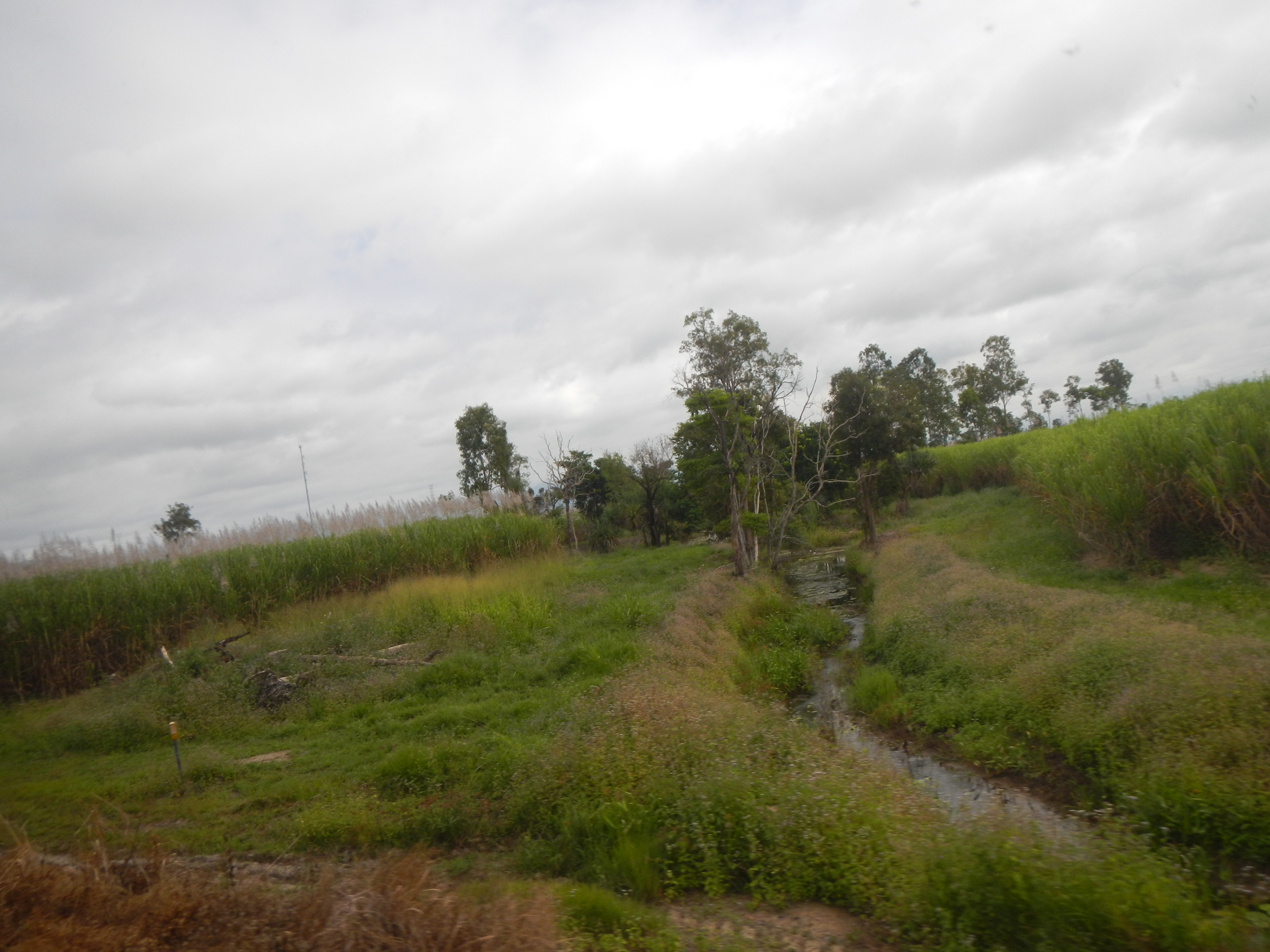
- Murrigal

- Interactive map of Murrigal
- Coordinates: 18.0519°S 145.9019°E
- Country: Australia
- State: Queensland
- LGA: Cassowary Coast Region
- Location: 17.5 km (10.9 mi) S of Tully; 68.7 km (42.7 mi) SSW of Innisfail; 156 km (97 mi) SSE of Cairns; 194 km (121 mi) NNW of Townsville; 1,553 km (965 mi) NNW of Brisbane

Government
  - State electorate: Hinchinbrook
  - Federal division: Kennedy

Area
  - Total: 40.9 km^{2} (15.8 sq mi)

Population
  - Total: 106 (2021 census)
  - Density: 2.592/km^{2} (6.71/sq mi)
- Time zone: UTC+10:00 (AEST)
- Postcode: 4854
Suburbs around Murrigal
Euramo	Euramo	Euramo
Murray Upper	Murrigal	Rockingham
Murray Upper	Bilyana	Bilyana

Murrigal is a rural locality in the Cassowary Coast Region, Queensland, Australia. In the 2021 census, Murrigal had a population of 106 people.

== Geography ==
The Bruce Highway enters the locality from the south (Bilyana) and exits to the north-east (Euramo). The North Coast railway line runs immediately parallel and west of the highway.

The land use is predominantly growing sugarcane with some grazing on native vegetation.

There is a network of cane tramways to transport the harvested sugarcane to the local sugar mill.

== History ==
Land was reserved for a cemetery on 3 August 1895.

The locality was once served by the now-abandoned Murrigal railway station is an abandoned railway station on the North Coast railway line (18.0647°S 145.9072°E).

== Demographics ==
In the 2016 census, Murrigal had a population of 89 people.

In the 2021 census, Murrigal had a population of 106 people.

== Education ==
There are no schools in Murrigal. The nearest government primary schools are Murray River Upper State School in neighbouring Murray Upper to the south-west and Tully State School in Tully to the north. The nearest government secondary school is Tully State High School, also in Tully.

== Facilities ==
Murrigal Cemetery is on a 0.61-hectare (1.5-acre) site on the eastern side of the Bruce Highway (18.0641°S 145.9078°E). It is operated by the Cassowary Coast Regional Council and new burials are restricted to those who already have reserved graves or have a family connection with those already buried there.
