= Silky Oak, Queensland =

Silky Oak
- Suburb
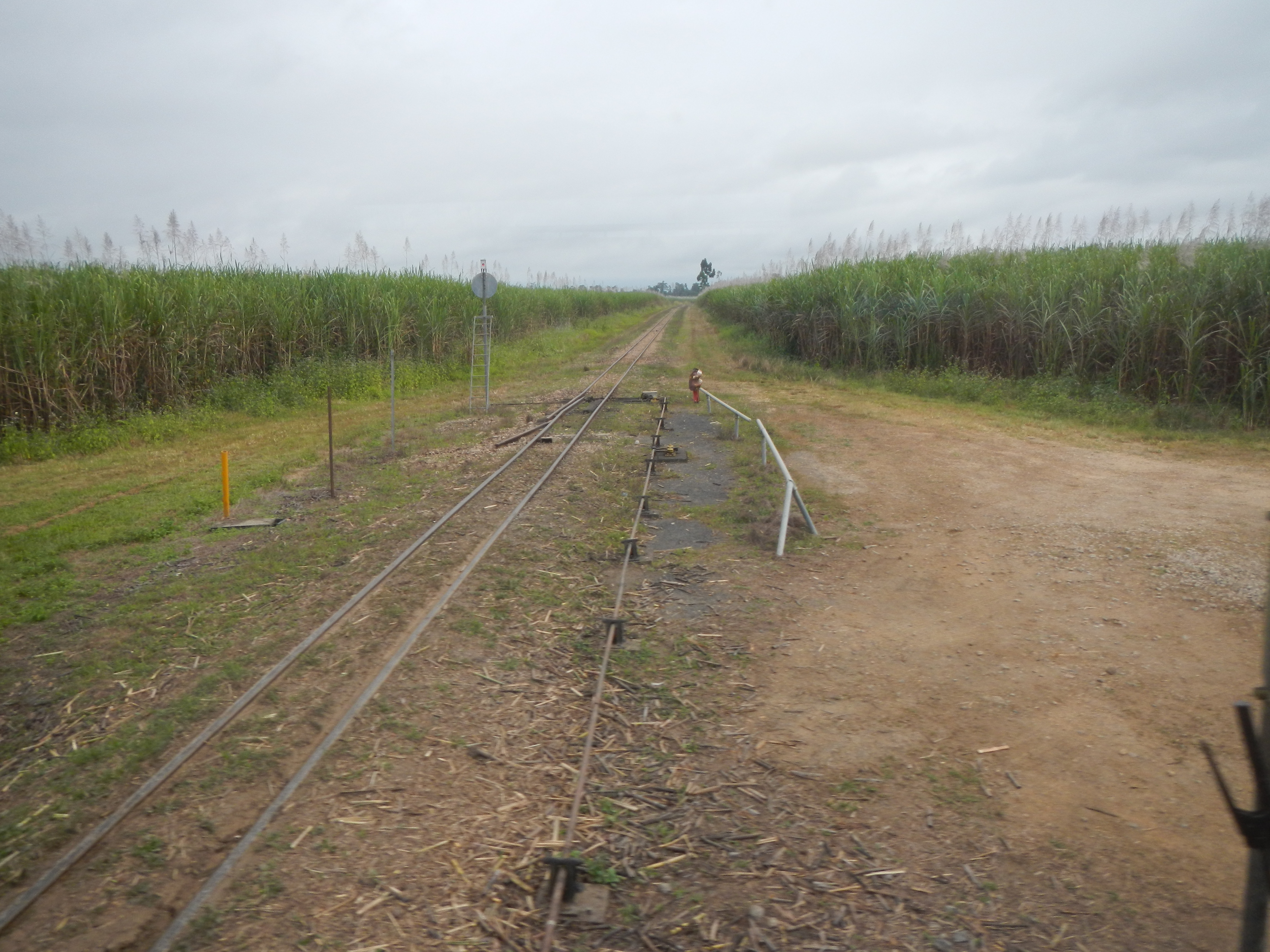
- Cane tramway through Silky Oak, 2013

- Interactive map of Silky Oak
- Coordinates: 17.9747°S 145.9494°E
- Country: Australia
- State: Queensland
- LGA: Cassowary Coast Region
- Location: 7.2 km (4.5 mi) S of Tully; 58.1 km (36.1 mi) S of Innisfail; 146 km (91 mi) S of Cairns; 203 km (126 mi) NNW of Townsville; 1,554 km (966 mi) NNW of Brisbane

Government
  - State electorate: Hinchinbrook
  - Federal division: Kennedy

Area
  - Total: 21.1 km^{2} (8.1 sq mi)

Population
  - Total: 178 (2021 census)
  - Density: 8.44/km^{2} (21.85/sq mi)
- Time zone: UTC+10:00 (AEST)
- Postcode: 4854
Suburbs around Silky Oak
Tully	Mount Mackay	Mount Mackay
Jarra Creek	Silky Oak	Lower Tully
Euramo	Euramo	Rockingham

Silky Oak is a rural locality in the Cassowary Coast Region, Queensland, Australia. In the 2021 census, Silky Oak had a population of 178 people.

== Geography ==
The locality is bounded to the south by the Tully River, while its tributary Banyan Creek bounds the locality to the west.

The North Coast railway line enters the locality from the south (Euramo) by crossing the Tully River and exits to the north-west (Tully). The locality was served by the now-abandoned Hewitt railway station in the north-west of the locality (17.96222°S 145.93528°E).

The Bruce Highway also enters the locality from the south (Euramo) crossing the river on the Tully River Bridge about 300 metres (980 ft) east of the railway line crossing, but then runs immediately parallel and east of the railway line through the locality until both exit to the north-west (Tully). This route is a 2008 deviation of the highway designed to reduce the flooding risk; it was the largest flood immunity project funded by the Australian Government. The previous Bruce Highway route was further east and is now known as Jack Evans Drive (and informally as Old Bruce Highway).

Silky Oak Creek is a small township within Silky Oak situated on the Old Bruce Highway (17.9833°S 145.9465°E).

The land use is predominantly growing sugarcane. There is a network of cane tramways to transport the harvested sugarcane to the local sugar mill.

== History ==
In 1900, the Queensland Government passed The Sugar Experiment Stations Act, creating the Bureau of Sugar Experiment Stations was under the supervision of the Queensland Minister for Agriculture and Stock. In 1968-9, a site was selected in Silky Oak as a suitable site for an experiment station to focus on the needs of the Tully sugar industry.

In 1922, Silky Oak Creek was seriously considered as the site for a sugar mill in the Tully area. In its favour, the site had good access to the Tully River, but being higher was safe from floods. It had abundant timber suitable for both construction and firewood. Against the location was that it could be cut off during flooding and that the limited water supply in the local creek would probably not be sufficient for the operation of the mill and the needs of the town that would develop around it, so a pipeline would be needed. However, the decision was made to build the mill further north (in what would then develop as the town of Tully).

Silky Oak Creek State School opened on 1 November 1940 and closed on 31 December 1974. It was at 254 Jack Evans Drive (17.98160°S 145.94591°E).

== Demographics ==
In the 2016 census, Silky Oak had a population of 139 people.

In the 2021 census, Silky Oak had a population of 178 people.

== Education ==
There are no schools in Silky Oak. The nearest government primary schools are Tully State School in neighbouring Tully to the north-west and Lower Tully State School in Lower Tully to the east. The nearest government secondary school is Tully State High School, also in Tully to the north-west.

== Facilities ==
Sugar Research Australia (a successor organisation of the Bureau of Sugar Experiment Stations) has its Tully research centre on a 37.66-hectare (93.1-acre) site at 216 Dallachy Road in the south-west of the locality (17.9775°S 145.9241°E). By working closely with farmers, mill operators, and other stakeholders, it undertakes research and provides advice on improvements in efficiency and sustainability, and explores new opportunities for sugar and other byproducts. The Tully research centre seeks to increase farm productivity in the Tully area through improved pest and disease management and plant nutrition.

== Amenities ==
Tully Motorcycle Club operates a motorcycle dirt course on Dallachy Road in the south-west of the locality for recreational use and race events (17.9818°S 145.9307°E).
