= Carruchan, Queensland =

Carruchan
- Suburb
- Interactive map of Carruchan
- Coordinates: 18.2469°S 145.9130°E
- Country: Australia
- State: Queensland
- LGA: Cassowary Coast Region
- Location: 38.7 km (24.0 mi) S of Tully; 89.8 km (55.8 mi) S of Innisfail; 176 km (109 mi) NW of Townsville; 177 km (110 mi) S of Cairns; 1,618 km (1,005 mi) NNW of Brisbane

Government
  - State electorate: Hinchinbrook
  - Federal division: Kennedy

Area
  - Total: 70.4 km^{2} (27.2 sq mi)

Population
  - Total: 247 (2021 census)
  - Density: 3.509/km^{2} (9.087/sq mi)
- Time zone: UTC+10:00 (AEST)
- Postcode: 4816
Suburbs around Carruchan
| Lumholtz | Kennedy | Kennedy |
| Lumholtz | Carruchan | Ellerbeck |
| Lumholtz | Lumholtz | Cardwell |

Carruchan is a rural locality in the Cassowary Coast Region, Queensland, Australia. In the 2021 census, Carruchan had a population of 247 people.

== Demographics ==
In the 2016 census, Carruchan had a population of 259 people.

In the 2021 census, Carruchan had a population of 247 people.

== Education ==
There are no schools in Carruchan. The nearest government primary schools are Kennedy State School in neighbouring Kennedy to the north-east and Cardwell State School in neighbouring Cardwell to the south-east. The nearest government secondary school is Tully State High School in Tully to the north.
