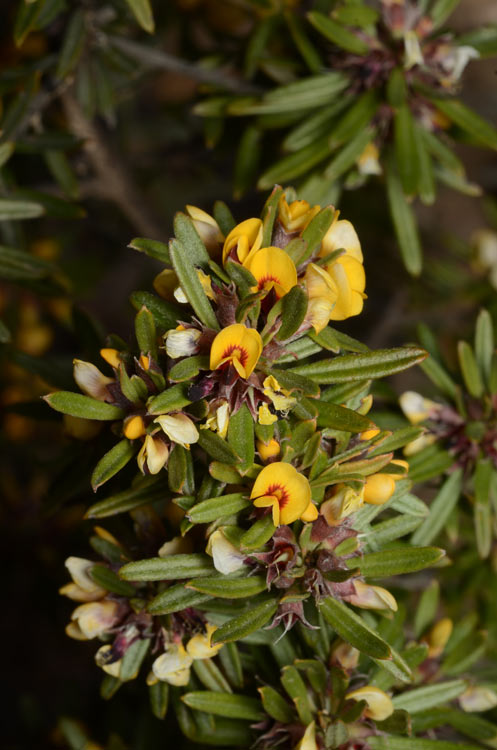
- Near Expedition National Park

Scientific classification
- Kingdom: Plantae
- Clade: Tracheophytes
- Clade: Angiosperms
- Clade: Eudicots
- Clade: Rosids
- Order: Fabales
- Family: Fabaceae
- Subfamily: Faboideae
- Genus: Pultenaea
- Species: P. petiolaris

Binomial name
- Pultenaea petiolaris A.Cunn. ex Benth.

= Pultenaea petiolaris =

Woolly bush-pea

Species of legume

Pultenaea petiolaris, commonly known as woolly bush-pea, is a species of flowering plant in the family Fabaceae and is endemic to eastern Australia. It is a low-lying shrub with linear leaves, pea-like flowers and flattened fruit.

== Description ==
Pultenaea petiolaris is a low-lying shrub with hairy stems. The leaves are linear, 10–25 mm (0.39–0.98 in) long and 1–2 mm (0.039–0.079 in) wide, with stipules about 3.5 mm (0.14 in) long at the base. There is a groove along the upper surface of the leaves, the edges are rolled under and the lower surface is paler than the upper surface. The flowers are arranged in dense clusters on the ends of branches and are about 9 mm (0.35 in) long, each flower on a pedicel about 1 mm (0.039 in) long. The sepals are 3–5 mm (0.12–0.20 in) long and there are bristly bracteoles 5 mm (0.20 in) long attached near the centre of the sepal tube. The fruit is a flattened pod 6–9 mm (0.24–0.35 in) long.

== Taxonomy ==
Pultenaea petiolaris was first formally described in 1837 by George Bentham from an unpublished description by Allan Cunningham. Bentham's description was published in his book Commentationes de Leguminosarum Generibus. The specific epithet (petiolaris) means "having a petiole".

== Distribution and habitat ==
This pultenaea grows in heath, woodland and forest from the North Kennedy district, inland to the Maranoa in Queensland, and south to Grafton in north-eastern New South Wales.
