= Euramo, Queensland =

Euramo
- Suburb
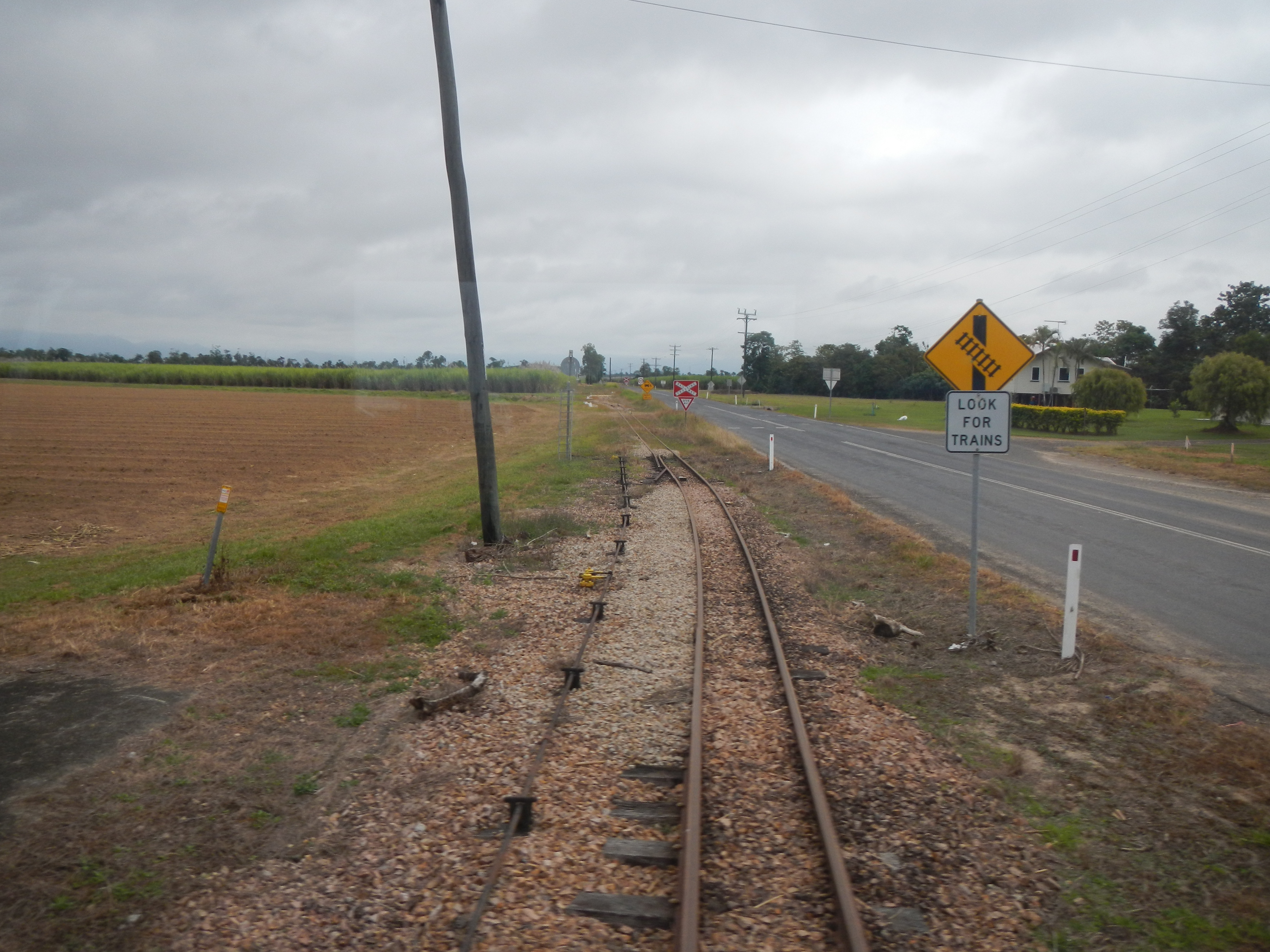
- Cane tramway tracks, Davidson Road, 2013

- Interactive map of Euramo
- Coordinates: 18.0044°S 145.8961°E
- Country: Australia
- State: Queensland
- LGA: Cassowary Coast Region
- Location: 8.8 km (5.5 mi) S of Tully; 49.9 km (31.0 mi) SSW of Innisfail; 147 km (91 mi) S of Cairns; 200 km (120 mi) NNW of Townsville; 1,531 km (951 mi) NNW of Brisbane

Government
  - State electorate: Hinchinbrook
  - Federal division: Kennedy

Area
  - Total: 30.6 km^{2} (11.8 sq mi)

Population
  - Total: 114 (2021 census)
  - Density: 3.725/km^{2} (9.65/sq mi)
- Time zone: UTC+10:00 (AEST)
- Postcode: 4854
Suburbs around Euramo
Jarra Creek	Jarra Creek	Silky Oak
Munro Plains	Euramo	Rockingham
Murray Upper	Murrigal	Rockingham

Euramo is a rural locality in the Cassowary Coast Region, Queensland, Australia. In the 2021 census, Euramo had a population of 114 people.

Riversdale is a neighbourhood (18.0000°S 145.8666°E) in the west of the locality.

== Geography ==
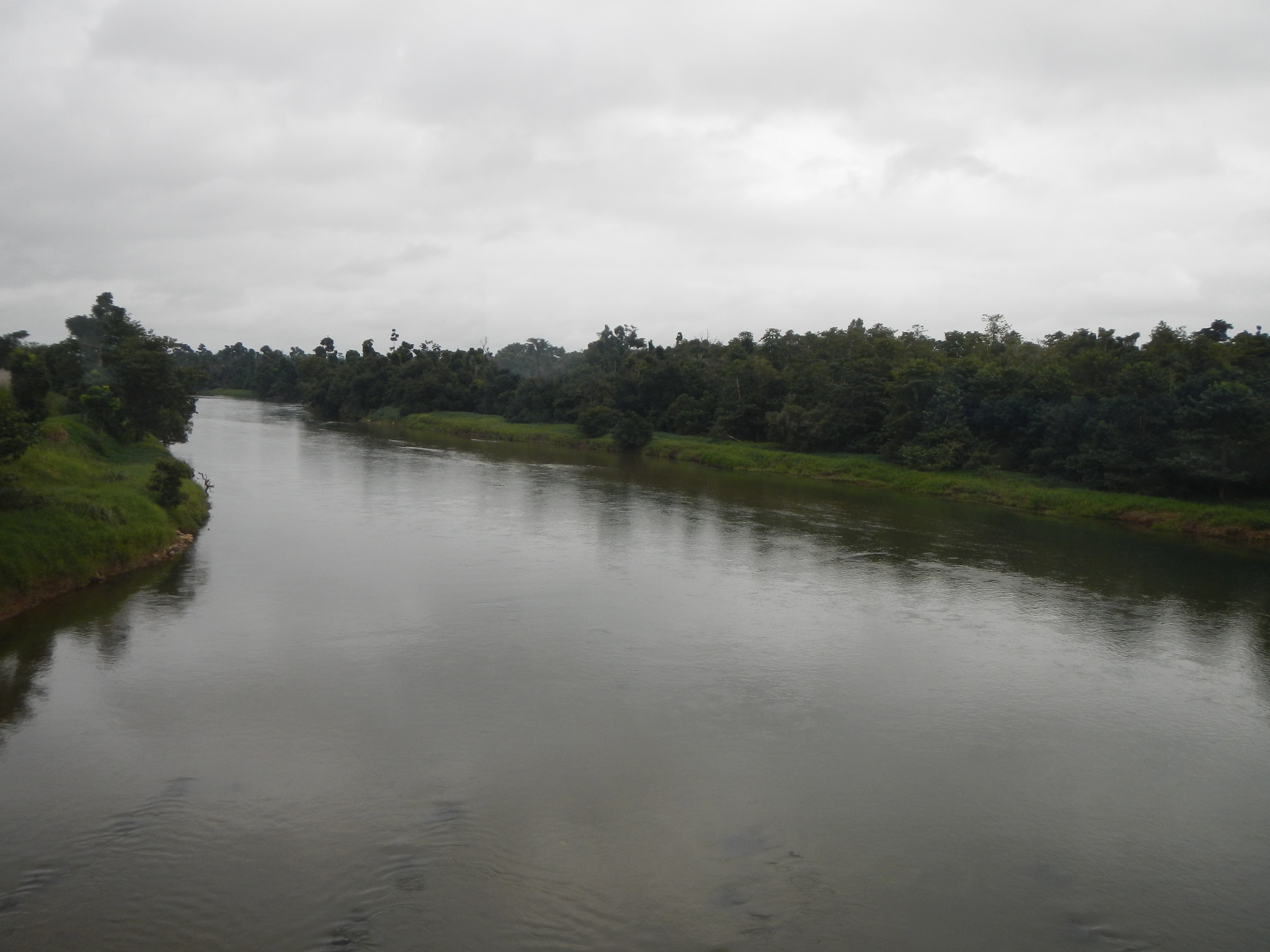
Tully River at Euramo, 2013

Euramo is bounded to the north by the Tully River and to the south by the Murray River.

The Bruce Highway traverses the eastern part of the locality, entering the locality from the south-east (Murrigal) and exiting to the north-east (Silky Oak). The North Coast railway line also traverses the locality immediately to the west of the highway with the locality being served by Euramo railway station (18.0033°S 145.9344°E).

Bellenden Plains is a plain spanning much of Euramo and Murrigal to the south, mostly under 10 metres (33 ft) above sea level (18.0166°S 145.8833°E).

Djilgarin Conservation Park is an 88.74-hectare (219.3-acre) protected area in centre of the locality (18.0025°S 145.8997°E). Apart from that, the land use is predominantly growing sugarcane.

== History ==
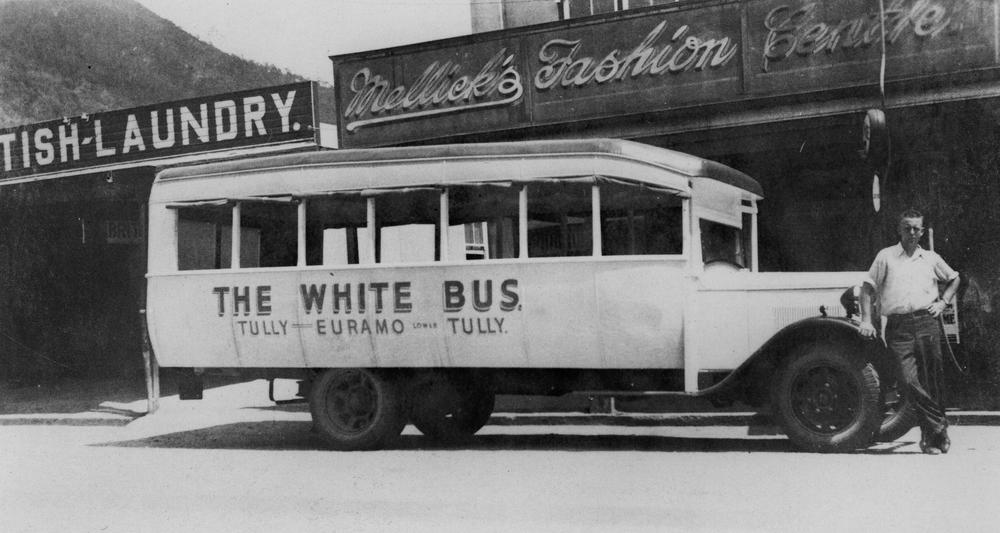
Bus service between Tully and Euramo, 1930s

Euramo State School opened on 19 September 1927. In 1930, a "new" school building was relocated from the closed Japoon West State School in Japoonvale to a site in Euramo donated by Mr J.A. Winter. It closed in 1974. The school was on the Bruce Highway (approx 18.0101°S 145.9346°E).

Riversdale State School opened on 11 May 1953. It closed on 23 August 1968. It was at approx 917 Davidson Road (17.9956°S 145.8602°E) on a site donated by Mrs Bryce Henry.

== Demographics ==
In the 2016 census, Euramo had a population of 147 people.

In the 2021 census, Euramo had a population of 114 people.

== Education ==
There are no schools in Euramo. The nearest government primary schools are Tully State School in Tully to the north and Murray River Upper State School in Murray Upper in the south-west. The nearest government secondary school is Tully State High School in Tully to the north.
