= Lower Tully, Queensland =

Lower Tully
- Suburb
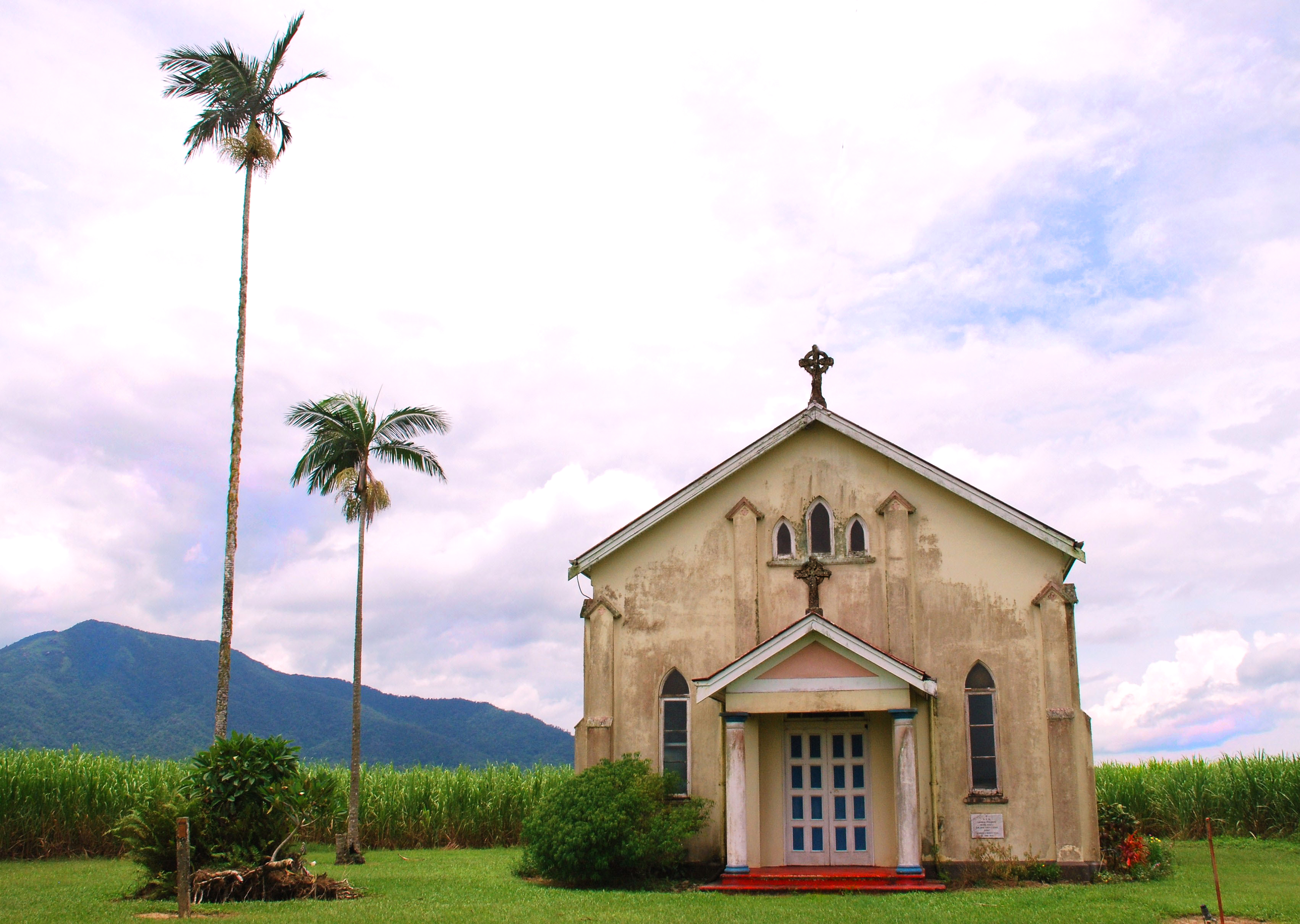
- Christ the King Catholic Church (among the canefields), 2009

- Interactive map of Lower Tully
- Coordinates: 17.9830°S 146.0133°E
- Country: Australia
- State: Queensland
- LGA: Cassowary Coast Region
- Location: 13.5 km (8.4 mi) SE of Tully; 64.6 km (40.1 mi) S of Innisfail; 152 km (94 mi) S of Cairns; 209 km (130 mi) NNW of Townsville; 1,651 km (1,026 mi) NNW of Brisbane

Government
  - State electorate: Hinchinbrook
  - Federal division: Kennedy

Area
  - Total: 40.6 km^{2} (15.7 sq mi)

Population
  - Total: 88 (2021 census)
  - Density: 2.167/km^{2} (5.61/sq mi)
- Time zone: UTC+10:00 (AEST)
- Postcode: 4854
Suburbs around Lower Tully
Mount Mackay	Mount Mackay	Carmoo
Silky Oak	Lower Tully	Hull Heads
Rockingham	Rockingham	Tully Heads

Lower Tully is a rural locality in the Cassowary Coast Region, Queensland, Australia. In the 2021 census, Lower Tully had a population of 88 people.

== Geography ==
The Tully River forms the southern boundary of the locality; the river enters the Coral Sea at neighbouring Tully Heads. The central and southern parts of the locality is freehold farming land, predominantly growing sugarcane; there is a cane tramway to deliver the sugarcane to the Tully Sugar Mill at Tully. The northern part of the locality contains the Hull River National Park, taking its name from the Hull River which flows through the northern part of the locality and then enters the Coral Sea at neighbouring Hull Heads.

== History ==
Lower Tully State School opened on 15 February 1932.

On Sunday 16 June 1935, the Vicar Apostolic of Cooktown John Heavey laid the foundation stone for a Roman Catholic church to be dedicated to Christ, the King; the building was expected to cost £1250. It is not known when the church opened but it was operational by July 1937. Due to a declining congregation and the ease of attending Catholic services in Tully, the church held its last regular Mass on 2 November 1984, although it was used for occasional baptisms and weddings. The church was sold in 1992 to new owners who make the church available for services by any denomination, renaming it "Chapel of the Pioneers". It is on Tully Hull Road (17.99546°S 145.99685°E). It is listed on the Cassowary Coast Local Heritage Register.

== Demographics ==
In the 2016 census, Lower Tully had a population of 79 people.

In the 2021 census, Lower Tully had a population of 88 people.

== Education ==
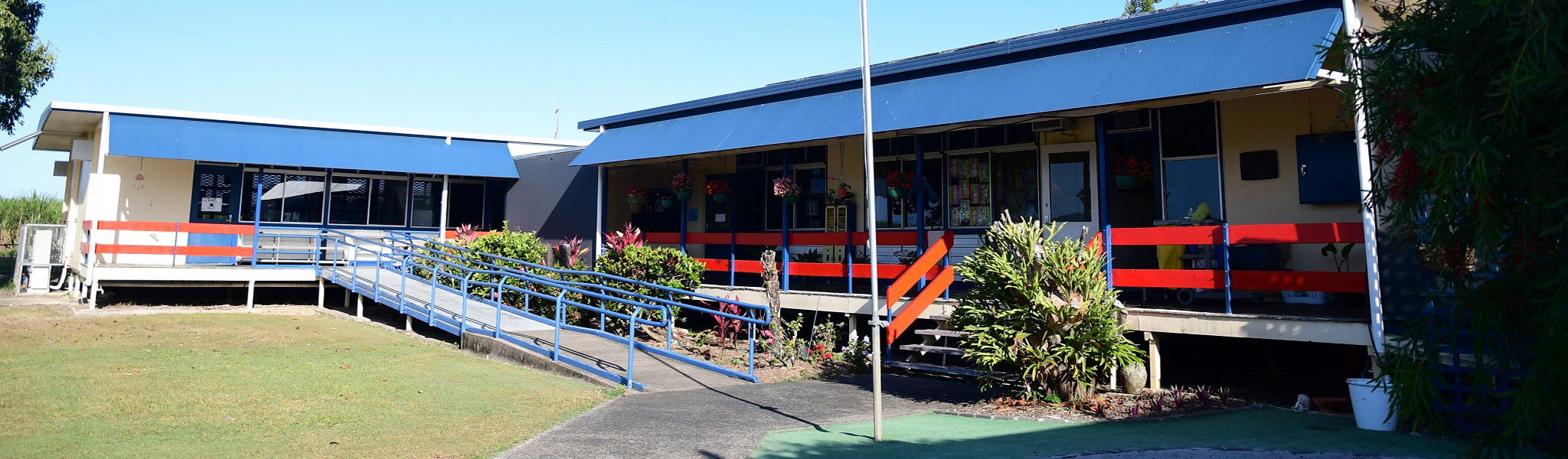
Lower Tully State School, 2022

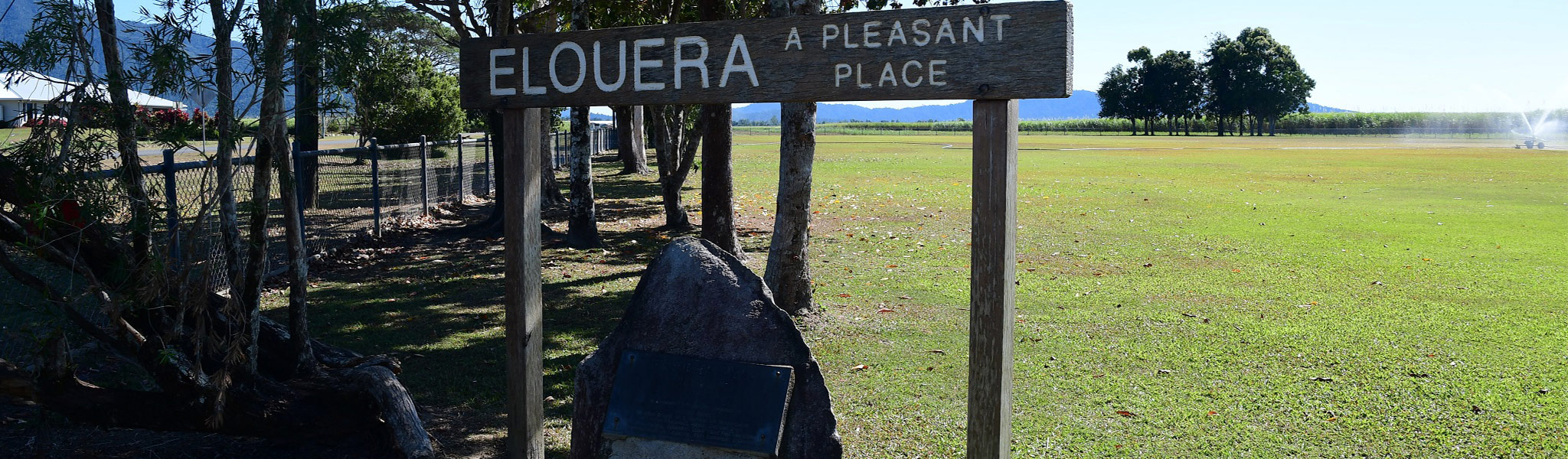
Outdoor area at the school, 2022

Lower Tully State School is a government primary (Prep-6) school for boys and girls at 6 Collins Road (17.9952°S 146.0005°E). In 2016, the school had an enrolment of 57 students with 6 teachers (4 full-time equivalent) and 7 non-teaching staff (3 full-time equivalent). In 2018, the school had an enrolment of 56 students with 5 teachers (3 full-time equivalent) and 8 non-teaching staff (4 full-time equivalent).

There are no secondary schools in Lower Tully. The nearest government secondary school is Tully State High School in Tully to the north-west.
