= Ellerbeck, Queensland =

Ellerbeck
- Suburb
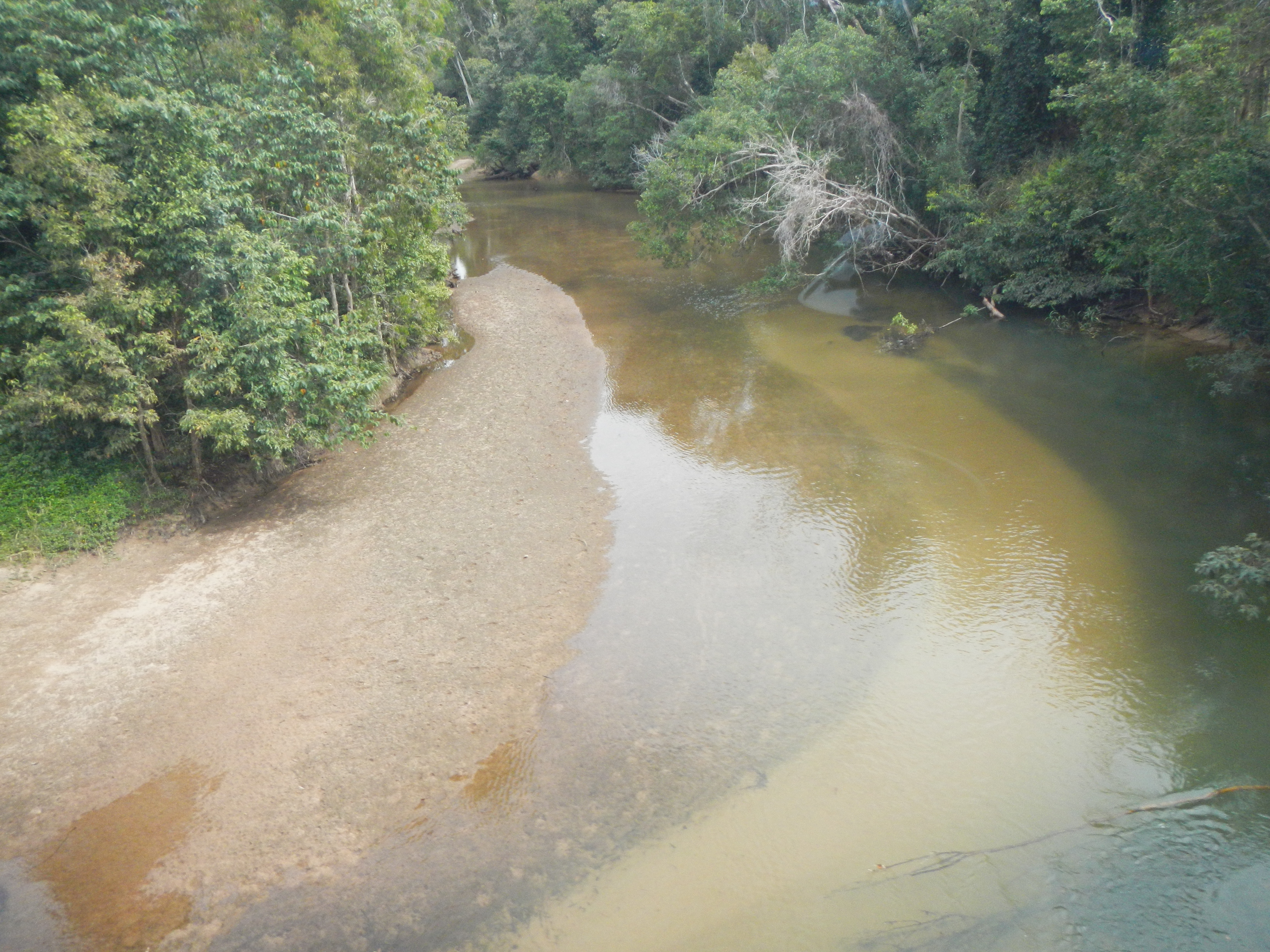
- Meunga Creek, Ellerbeck

- Interactive map of Ellerbeck
- Coordinates: 18.2411°S 145.9941°E
- Country: Australia
- State: Queensland
- LGA: Cassowary Coast Region
- Location: 4.9 km (3.0 mi) NW of Cardwell; 38.7 km (24.0 mi) S of Tully; 89.8 km (55.8 mi) S of Innisfail; 177 km (110 mi) S of Cairns; 1,522 km (946 mi) NNW of Brisbane

Government
  - State electorate: Hinchinbrook
  - Federal division: Kennedy

Area
  - Total: 28.6 km^{2} (11.0 sq mi)

Population
  - Total: 207 (2021 census)
  - Density: 7.238/km^{2} (18.75/sq mi)
- Time zone: UTC+10:00 (AEST)
- Postcode: 4849
Suburbs around Ellerbeck
Kennedy	Kennedy	Kennedy
Kennedy	Ellerbeck	Coral Sea
Carruchan	Cardwell	Cardwell

Ellerbeck is a coastal locality in the Cassowary Coast Region, Queensland, Australia. In the 2021 census, Ellerbeck had a population of 207 people.

== Geography ==
The locality is bounded to the south by Attie Creek, a tributary of Meunga Creek which forms the south-western boundary of the locality and then flows east through the locality to the Coral Sea (18.23139°S 146.01472°E).

The Bruce Highway enters the locality from the south-east (Cardwell) and exits to the north-west (Kennedy).

The North Coast railway line also enters the locality from the south-east (Cardwell) and exits to the north-west (Kennedy). The locality was served by the now-abandoned Ellerbeck railway station (18.2428°S 145.9933°E).

Part of the eastern coastal of the locality is within the Girramay National Park. Apart from this protected area, the remainder of the locality is mixture of agricultural use (crop growing and grazing on native vegetation) and rural residential housing.

== History ==
The locality was named after the Ellerbeck railway station, which was in turn named on 18 February 1925 by the Queensland Railways Department.

The name for the parish has been documented since 1866. As for the locality, the name of the town of Ellerbeck near Osnabrück was probably the basis. Though, however, can be seen as a Germanic language name, Ellerbeck is therefore found in England or North Germany.

== Demographics ==
In the 2016 census, Ellerbeck had a population of 205 people.

In the 2021 census, Ellerbeck had a population of 207 people.

== Education ==
There are no schools in Ellerbeck. The nearest government primary schools are Cardwell State School in neighbouring Cardwell to the south-east and Kennedy State School in neighbouring Kennedy to the north-west. The nearest government secondary school is Tully State High School in Tully to the north.

== Facilities ==
There is a boat ramp on Meunga Creek Boat Ramp Road on the south bank of Meunga Creek (18.2320°S 146.0145°E). It is managed by the Cassowary Coast Regional Council.

Cardwell Waste Transfer Station on Lawson Drive accepts waste for both recycling and landfill (18.2451°S 146.0087°E).

== Climate ==
The climate of Ellerbek is classified as tropical monsoon climate (Köppen Am).

Climate data for Ellerbeck
Month	Jan	Feb	Mar	Apr	May	Jun	Jul	Aug	Sep	Oct	Nov	Dec	Year
Mean daily maximum °F (°C)	89.6 (32.0)	87.8 (31.0)	87.8 (31.0)	84.2 (29.0)	80.6 (27.0)	77.0 (25.0)	77.0 (25.0)	78.8 (26.0)	82.4 (28.0)	84.2 (29.0)	86.0 (30.0)	87.8 (31.0)	83.6 (28.7)
Daily mean °F (°C)	82.4 (28.0)	81.5 (27.5)	80.6 (27.0)	77.0 (25.0)	73.4 (23.0)	68.9 (20.5)	68.0 (20.0)	68.9 (20.5)	72.5 (22.5)	76.1 (24.5)	78.8 (26.0)	80.6 (27.0)	75.7 (24.3)
Mean daily minimum °F (°C)	75.2 (24.0)	75.2 (24.0)	73.4 (23.0)	69.8 (21.0)	66.2 (19.0)	60.8 (16.0)	59.0 (15.0)	59.0 (15.0)	62.6 (17.0)	68.0 (20.0)	71.6 (22.0)	73.4 (23.0)	67.9 (19.9)
Average rainfall inches (mm)	16.16 (410.4)	18.59 (472.3)	14.96 (380.1)	7.82 (198.6)	3.85 (97.9)	1.50 (38.1)	1.26 (31.9)	1.04 (26.5)	1.74 (44.3)	2.44 (62.1)	5.23 (132.8)	8.36 (212.3)	82.95 (2,107.3)
Average precipitation days	14	15	15	13	9	5	4	3	4	5	8	10	105
Source: NOAA over google search
