= Hull Heads, Queensland =

Hull Heads
- Town
- Interactive map of Hull Heads
- Coordinates: 17.9969°S 146.0702°E
- Country: Australia
- State: Queensland
- LGA: Cassowary Coast Region
- Location: 20.8 km (12.9 mi) SE of Tully; 72 km (45 mi) S of Innisfail; 159 km (99 mi) S of Cairns; 217 km (135 mi) NNW of Townsville; 1,548 km (962 mi) NNW of Brisbane

Government
  - State electorate: Hinchinbrook
  - Federal division: Kennedy

Area
  - Total: 17.8 km^{2} (6.9 sq mi)

Population
  - Total: 127 (2021 census)
  - Density: 7.13/km^{2} (18.48/sq mi)
- Time zone: UTC+10:00 (AEST)
- Postcode: 4854
Localities around Hull Heads
Carmoo	South Mission Beach	Dunk
Lower Tully	Hull Heads	Coral Sea
Tully Heads	Tully Heads	Coral Sea

Hull Heads is a coastal town and locality in the Cassowary Coast Region, Queensland, Australia. In the 2021 census, the locality of Hull Heads had a population of 127 people.

== Geography ==
The locality is mostly located on the southern side of the Hull River with the town of Hull Heads on the southern headland near the mouth of the river.

Googarra Beach is a second town within the locality on the beach near the locality's southern boundary (18.0072°S 146.0583°E) which has yet to be developed.

== History ==
It was originally named Googarra until renamed Hull by the Queensland Place Names Board on 1 November 1963. The town take its name from the Hull River, which in turn was named after surveyor Alfred Arthur Hull, who worked in the area from 1870 to 1872.

Googarra is believed to be a corruption of the Aboriginal name Galmora, known by Europeans as Jackey Jackey who was a member of Edmund Kennedy's exploration of Cape York Peninsula; the town of Googarra Beach was named by Queensland Place Names Board on 1 November 1963.

== Demographics ==
In the 2016 census, the locality of Hull Heads had a population of 113 people.

In the 2021 census, the locality of Hull Heads had a population of 127 people.

== Education ==
There are no schools in Hull Heads. The nearest government primary school is Lower Tully State School in neighbouring Lower Tully to the south-east. The nearest government secondary school is Tully State High School in Tully to the north-west.
