= Jumbun, Queensland =

Jumbun Queensland
- Coordinates: 18.1274°S 145.7981°E
- Population: 93 (2021 census)
- Postcode(s): 4854
- Time zone: AEST (UTC+10:00)
- Location: 32.5 km (20 mi) S of Tully; 83.4 km (52 mi) SW of Innisfail; 171 km (106 mi) S of Cairns; 202 km (126 mi) NNW of Townsville; 1,558 km (968 mi) NNW of Brisbane
- LGA(s): Cassowary Coast Region
- State electorate(s): Hinchinbrook
- Federal division(s): Kennedy

Jumbun is an Aboriginal community located in Murray Upper, Cassowary Coast Region which is 40 kilometres (25 mi) south-west of Tully in Far North Queensland, Australia. The word "jumbun" means "wood-grub" in Girrimay. The residents of Jumbun are predominantly from the Girramay and Dyirbal Aboriginal nations. In the 2021 census, Jumbun had a population of 93 Indigenous Australian people.

== History ==
Dyirbal (also known as Djirbal) is a language of Far North Queensland, particularly the area around Tully and Tully River Catchment extending to the Atherton Tablelands. The Dyirbal language region includes the landscape within the local government boundaries of Cassowary Coast Regional Council and Tablelands Regional Council.

== Demographics ==
In the 2011 census, Jumbun had a population of 104 Indigenous Australian people.

In the 2021 census, Jumbun had a population of 93 Indigenous Australian people.

== Education ==
There are no schools in Jumbun. The nearest government primary school is Murray River Upper State School in Murray Upper to the north-east. The nearest government secondary school is Tully State High School in Tully to the north-east. There is also a Catholic primary school in Tully.

== Culture ==
The Jumbun Aboriginal community is known for its basket weavers who have retained the cultural knowledge for making the distinctive lawyercane bicornal basket styles including burrajingal, gundala and mindi. In recent times, these baskets were used for both everyday and ceremonial uses including carrying bush foods, babies, message sticks and ceremonial objects. The jawun style of bicornal basket is unique to the rainforest Aboriginal peoples of North Queensland. Other unique lawyercane artefacts include the wungarr, which was used in freshwater creeks to catch eels.

Examples of the jawun and other basket weaving styles are regularly shown in national exhibitions and older examples are kept in special "keeping places" which house important cultural artefacts. A "keeping place" has been built at Jumbun while the Girringun Aboriginal Corporation in Cardwell also has another (Davey "Buckeroo" Lawrence Education, Training and Cultural Centre on the Bruce Highway, 235 Victoria St Cardwell).

=== Tours ===
Jumbun has recently relaunched its cultural tours. These tours include an inspection of the Keeping Place before a cultural walk into the rainforest is undertaken to showcase the practical knowledge of plants and animals in the forest. Opportunities for basket weaving and traditional jewellery making with women from the community is a highlight of the tour, as well as the serenity of the Moombay campsite where the tour takes place, with the gentle sounds of birdsong and the Murray River making for a stunning backdrop for a unique cultural experience.

== See also ==
- Australian Aboriginal culture
