= Tully Heads, Queensland =

Tully Heads
- Town
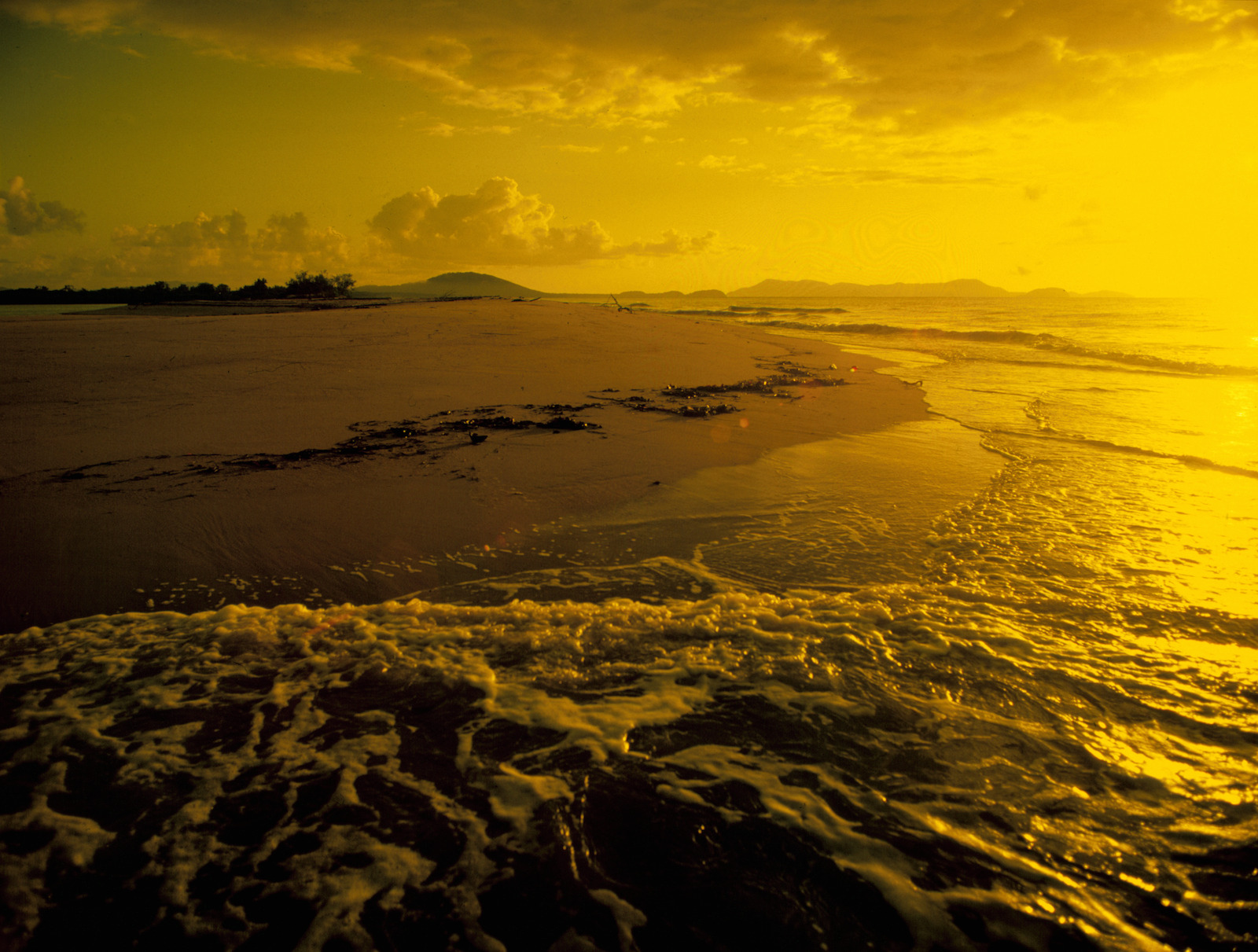
- Sunset over the beach at Tully Heads, 1984

- Interactive map of Tully Heads
- Coordinates: 18.0191°S 146.0566°E
- Country: Australia
- State: Queensland
- LGA: Cassowary Coast Region
- Location: 20.4 km (12.7 mi) SE of Tully; 71.3 km (44.3 mi) S of Innisfail; 159 km (99 mi) S of Cairns; 216 km (134 mi) NNW of Townsville; 1,566 km (973 mi) NNW of Brisbane

Government
  - State electorate: Hinchinbrook
  - Federal division: Kennedy

Area
  - Total: 11.1 km^{2} (4.3 sq mi)

Population
  - Total: 354 (2021 census)
  - Density: 31.89/km^{2} (82.6/sq mi)
- Time zone: UTC+10:00 (AEST)
- Postcode: 4854
Localities around Tully Heads
Lower Tully	Hull Heads	Hull Heads
Lower Tully	Tully Heads	Coral Sea
Rockingham	Rockingham	Rockingham

Tully Heads is a coastal town and locality in the Cassowary Coast Region, Queensland, Australia. In the 2021 census, the locality of Tully Heads had a population of 354 people.

== Geography ==
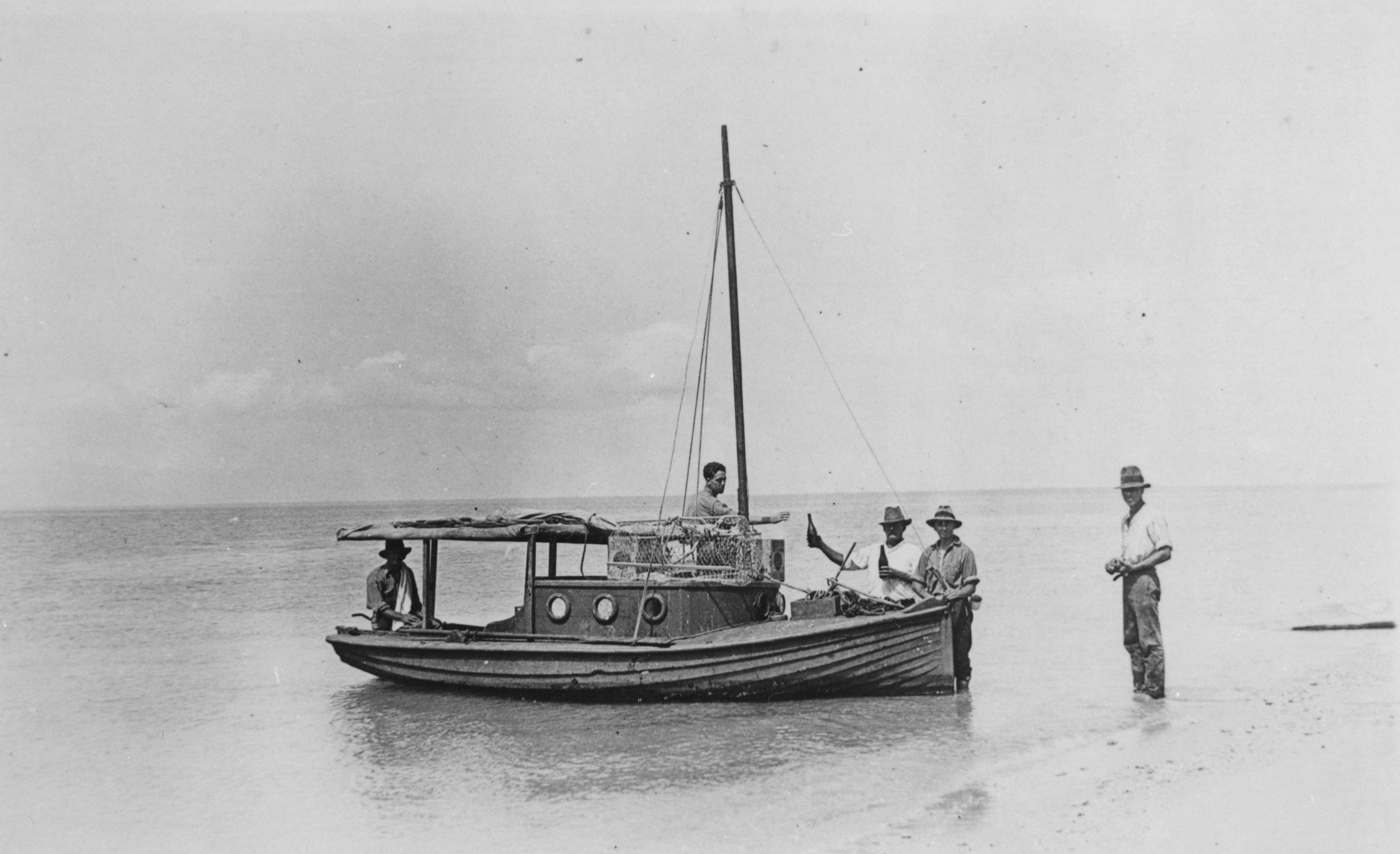
Fishing boat named Red Wing off Tully Heads, circa 1930

The Coral Sea forms the eastern boundary, and the Tully River the southern.

The beach Googarra Beach (18.0104°S 146.0619°E) extends along the locality's coast line extending into Hull Heads to the north.

Immediately offshore is Rockingham Bay (18.02°S 146.070°E). It was named on 8 June 1770 by Lieutenant James Cook on his 1770 voyage on the HM Bark Endeavour, after Charles Watson-Wentworth, the Second Marquis of Rockingham and former British Prime Minister.

== History ==
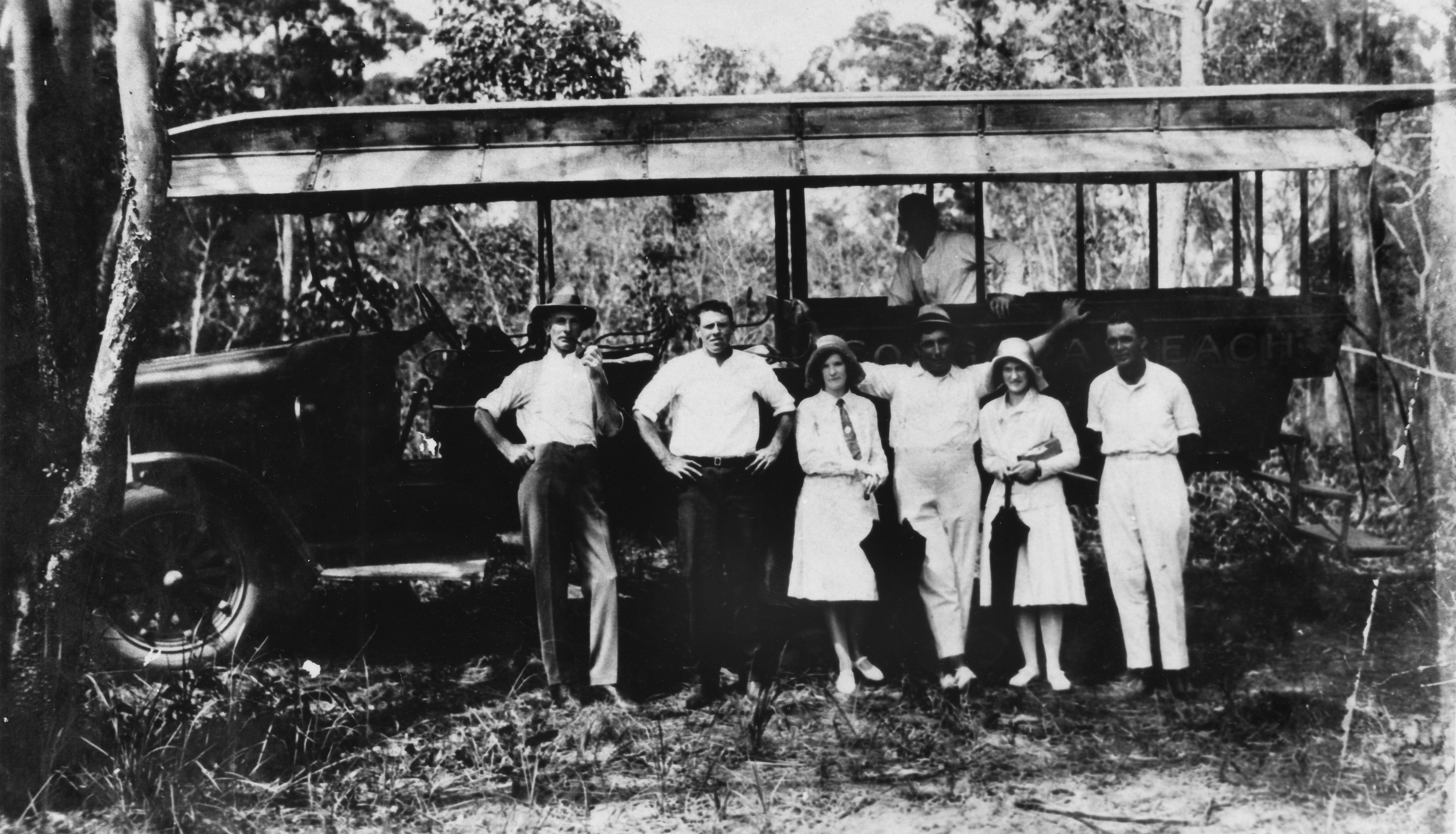
Googarra Beach bus with passengers, Tully Heads, circa 1930

The town and locality of Tully are named after the Tully River, which in turn was named after surveyor-general William Alcock Tully.

in 1963 to 1964, sailor William Willis, at the age of 71, sailed 10,000 miles from South America to Australia single-handing a 34-foot (10.4 m) raft named Age Unlimited. He left Callao in Peru on 5 July 1963, made a lengthy stop in Apia in Samoa, and after a total of 204 days at sea, arrived near Tully Heads, completing his voyage on 9 September 1964. He was severely injured on his arrival, being paralysed from the waist down, and was rescued by teacher Hendrik Jan Penning, a resident of Tully Heads.

On 3 February 2011, Tully Heads suffered extensive damage when Cyclone Yasi made landfall, causing a storm surge.

== Demographics ==
In the 2016 census, the locality of Tully Heads had a population of 354 people.

In the 2021 census, the locality of Tully Heads had a population of 354 people.

== Education ==
There are no school in Tully Heads. The nearest government primary school is Lower Tully State School in neighbouring Lower Tully to the west. The nearest government secondary school is Tully State High School in Tully to the north-west.

== Amenities ==
There is a boat ramp in Galmahra Street into Mosquito Creek, a tributary of the Tully River (18.0186°S 146.0518°E). It is managed by the Cassowary Coast Regional Council.
