= Carmoo, Queensland =

Carmoo
- Suburb
- Interactive map of Carmoo
- Coordinates: 17.9491°S 146.0413°E
- Country: Australia
- State: Queensland
- LGA: Cassowary Coast Region
- Location: 17.4 km (10.8 mi) E of Tully; 63.3 km (39.3 mi) S of Innisfail; 151 km (94 mi) S of Cairns; 224 km (139 mi) NNW of Townsville; 1,665 km (1,035 mi) NNW of Brisbane

Government
  - State electorate: Hill
  - Federal division: Kennedy

Area
  - Total: 7.1 km^{2} (2.7 sq mi)

Population
  - Total: 179 (2021 census)
  - Density: 25.21/km^{2} (65.3/sq mi)
- Postcode: 4852
Suburbs around Carmoo
Mount Mackay	Mount Mackay	Tam O'Shanter
Lower Tully	Carmoo	South Mission Beach
Lower Tully	Hull Heads	Hull Heads

Carmoo is a rural locality in the Cassowary Coast Region, Queensland, Australia. In the 2021 census, Carmoo had a population of 179 people.

== Demographics ==
In the 2016 census, Carmoo had a population of 178 people.

In the 2021 census, Carmoo had a population of 179 people.

== Education ==
There are no schools in Carmoo. The nearest government primary schools are Mission Beach State School in Wongaling Beach to the north-east and Lower Tully State School in neighbouring Lower Tully to the south-west. The nearest government secondary school is Tully State High School in Tully to the west.
