= Bilyana, Queensland =

Bilyana
- Suburb
- Interactive map of Bilyana
- Coordinates: 18.1172°S 145.9622°E
- Country: Australia
- State: Queensland
- LGA: Cassowary Coast Region
- Location: 22.5 km (14.0 mi) S of Tully; 73.6 km (45.7 mi) SSW of Innisfail; 161 km (100 mi) S of Cairns; 187 km (116 mi) NW of Townsville; 1,548 km (962 mi) NNW of Brisbane

Government
  - State electorate: Hinchinbrook
  - Federal division: Kennedy

Area
  - Total: 130.3 km^{2} (50.3 sq mi)

Population
  - Total: 190 (2021 census)
  - Density: 1.46/km^{2} (3.78/sq mi)
- Time zone: UTC+10:00 (AEST)
- Postcode: 4854
Suburbs around Bilyana
Murrigal	Rockingham	Coral Sea
Murray Upper	Bilyana	Coral Sea
Kennedy	Kennedy	Coral Sea

Bilyana is a coastal locality in the Cassowary Coast Region, Queensland, Australia. In the 2021 census, Bilyana had a population of 190 people.

== Geography ==
The Coral Sea forms the eastern boundary, and the Murray River part of the northern.

The Bruce Highway runs through from south-west to north-west.

Bilyana railway station is on the North Coast railway line (18.1145°S 145.9101°E).

The main land use is grazing on native vegetation in the north of the locality and growing sugarcane in the south of the locality. The residential areas are in the south and south-west of the locality.

== History ==
Girramay (also known as Giramay, Garamay, Giramai, Keramai) is a language of Far North Queensland, particularly the area around Herbert River Catchment taking in the towns of Cardwell and Ingham. The Girramay language region includes the landscape within the local government boundaries of Cassowary Coast and Hinchinbrook Regional Councils.

== Demographics ==
In the 2016 census, Bilyana had a population of 180 people.

In the 2021 census, Bilyana had a population of 190 people.

== Education ==
There are no schools in Bilyana. The nearest government primary school is Murray River Upper State School in neighbouring Murray Upper to the west and Kennedy State School in neighbouring Kennedy to the south. The nearest government secondary school is Tully State High School in Tully to the north.
