= Kennedy, Queensland =

Kennedy
- Suburb
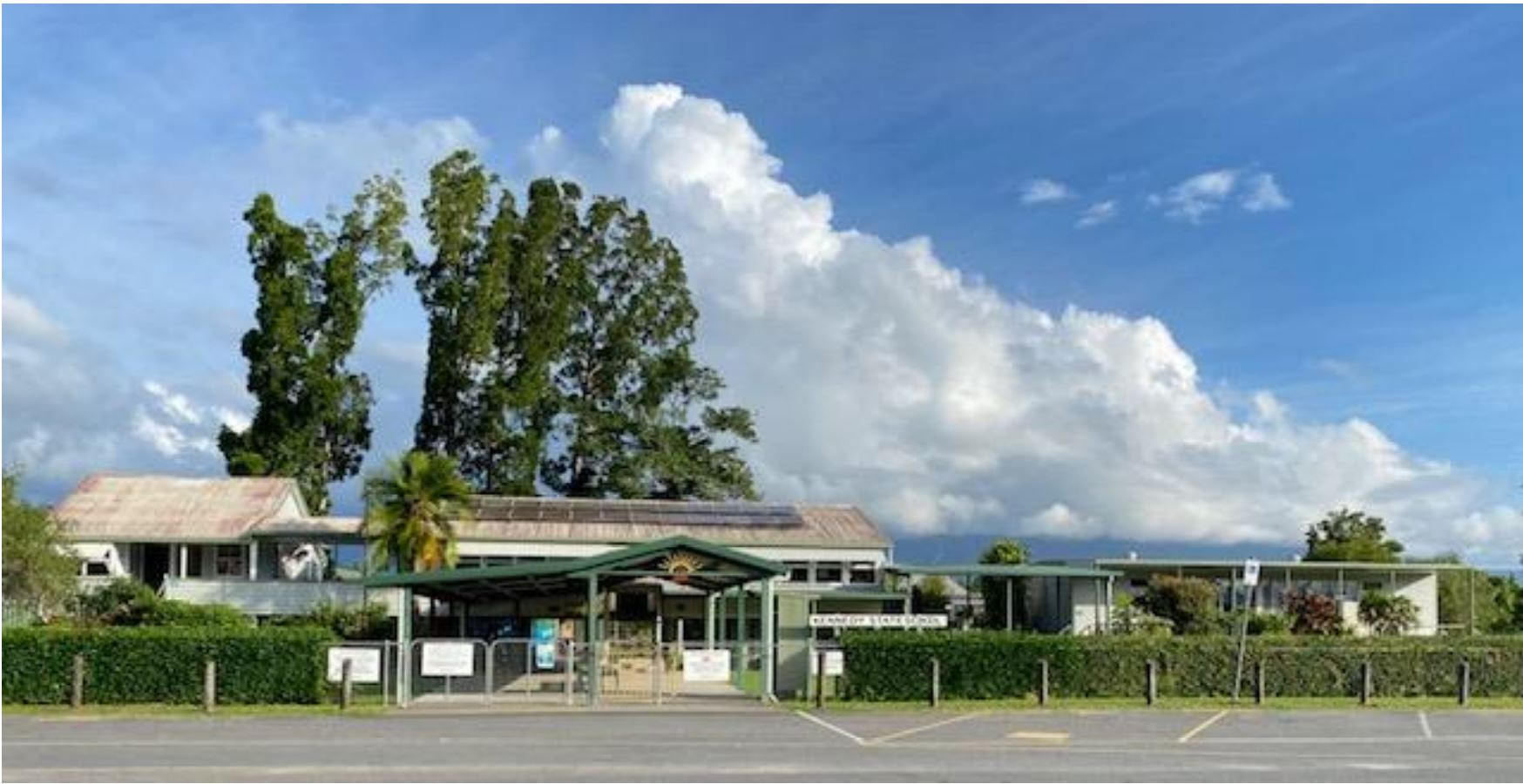
- Kennedy State School, 2023

- Interactive map of Kennedy
- Coordinates: 18.1933°S 145.9633°E
- Country: Australia
- State: Queensland
- LGA: Cassowary Coast Region
- Location: 10.1 km (6.3 mi) NW of Cardwell; 33.5 km (20.8 mi) S of Tully; 84.6 km (52.6 mi) S of Innisfail; 175 km (109 mi) NNW of Townsville; 1,533 km (953 mi) NNW of Brisbane

Government
  - State electorate: Hinchinbrook
  - Federal division: Kennedy

Area
  - Total: 99.6 km^{2} (38.5 sq mi)
- Elevation: 0–710 m (0–2,329 ft)

Population
  - Total: 136 (2021 census)
  - Density: 1.365/km^{2} (3.537/sq mi)
- Time zone: UTC+10:00 (AEST)
- Postcode: 4816
Suburbs around Kennedy
Murray Upper	Bilyana	Coral Sea
Lumholtz	Kennedy	Coral Sea
Carruchan	Ellerbeck	Coral Sea

Kennedy is a coastal locality in the Cassowary Coast Region, Queensland, Australia. In the 2021 census, Kennedy had a population of 136 people.

== Geography ==
Kennedy is on the coast with the Coral Sea forming its eastern boundary.

The Bruce Highway enters the locality from the south (Ellerbeck) and exits to the north (Bilyana). The North Coast railway line also passes through the locality from south to north, just to the west of the highway. The locality is served by the Kennedy railway station (18.2073°S 145.9569°E), but Dallachy railway station (18.1664°S 145.9309°E) has been abandoned.

The eastern part of the locality and the farmland is mostly at sea level but rises to 710 metres (2,330 ft) above sea level in the north-west of the locality in the foothills of nearby Mount Carruchan.

The eastern coastal part of the locality is within the Girramay National Park, as is the north-west of the locality. Other areas in the west of the locality are part of the Cardwell State Forest. The remaining land use is a mixture of agricultural purposes, including growing crops (particularly sugarcane) and grazing on native vegetation.

Dallarchy Aerodrome is at 56480 Bruce Highway on (18.1780°S 145.9495°E) and serves the nearby town of Cardwell to the south. The aerodrome has a 1-kilometre (0.62 mi) grass runway and is operated by the Cassowary Coast Regional Council.

== History ==
The locality was named after the Kennedy railway station, which was originally the Mulgan railway station until it was renamed on 20 February 1926 after the explorer Edmund Kennedy.

Kennedy Creek Provisional School opened on 14 March 1927, becoming Kennedy Creek State School on 1 November 1944. It was renamed Kennedy State School on 19 February 1945.

== Demographics ==
In the 2006 census, Kennedy had a population of 312 people.

In the 2016 census, Kennedy had a population of 161 people.

In the 2021 census, Kennedy had a population of 136 people.

== Education ==
Kennedy State School is a government primary (Prep–6) school for boys and girls at 161 Kennedy Creek Road (18.2092°S 145.9421°E). In 2017, the school had an enrolment of 21 students with 4 teachers (3 full-time equivalent) and 7 non-teaching staff (4 full-time equivalent).

There are no secondary schools in Kennedy. The nearest government secondary school is Tully State High School in Tully to the north.
