= Murray Upper, Queensland =

Murray Upper
- Suburb
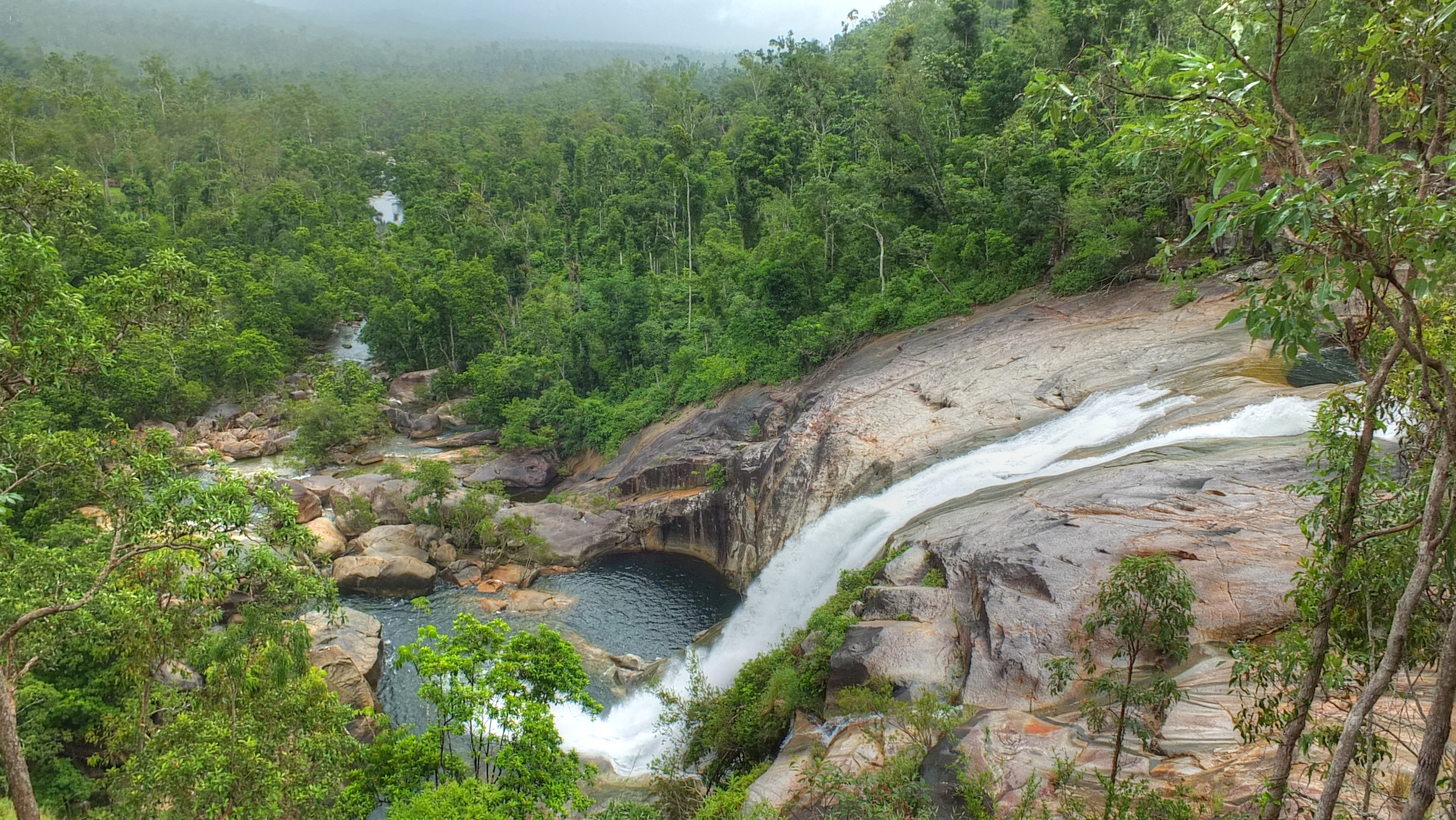
- Murray Falls, 2013

- Interactive map of Murray Upper
- Coordinates: 18.1222°S 145.8016°E
- Country: Australia
- State: Queensland
- LGA: Cassowary Coast Region
- Location: 36.0 km (22.4 mi) SW of Tully; 83.7 km (52.0 mi) SSW of Innisfail; 171 km (106 mi) S of Cairns; 203 km (126 mi) NNW of Townsville; 1,552 km (964 mi) NNW of Brisbane

Government
  - State electorate: Hinchinbrook
  - Federal division: Kennedy

Area
  - Total: 257.5 km^{2} (99.4 sq mi)

Population
  - Total: 218 (2021 census)
  - Density: 0.8466/km^{2} (2.193/sq mi)
- Time zone: UTC+10:00 (AEST)
- Postcode: 4854
Suburbs around Murray Upper
Kooroomool	Warrami; Munro Plains	Euramo; Murrigal
Kirrama	Murray Upper	Bilyana
Kirrama	Lumholtz	Kennedy

Murray Upper is a rural locality in the Cassowary Coast Region, Queensland, Australia. In the 2021 census, Murray Upper had a population of 218 people.

== Geography ==
The Murray River rises in Murray Upper and enters the Coral Sea at neighbouring Bilyana. Almost all of the locality is mountainous (rising to peaks of about 900 metres about sea level) and is within the Girramay National Park or the Murray Upper State Forest. Only a small area in the north-east of the locality is outside the protected areas and is flat land about 20 metres about sea level where the land use is farming, with sugarcane and bananas being important crops. A cane tramway passes through the farming area to carry the harvested sugarcane to the sugar mill at Tully.

Jumbun Aboriginal community is located on Murray Falls Road in Murray Upper at 18.1274°S 145.7981°E.

== History ==
Girramay (also known as Giramay, Garamay, Giramai, Keramai) is a language of Far North Queensland, particularly the area around Herbert River Catchment taking in the towns of Bilyana, Cardwell and Ingham. The Girramay language region includes the landscape within the local government boundaries of Cassowary Coast and Hinchinbrook Regional Councils.

Murray River Upper Provisional School opened on 18 January 1904. It became Murray River Upper State School on 1 October 1904. It closed temporarily due to low student numbers in 1910, 1922, July 1924 to July 1925, and 16 May 1927 to 4 November 1934.

== Demographics ==
In the 2016 census, Murray Upper had a population of 266 people.

In the 2021 census, Murray Upper had a population of 218 people.

== Education ==
Murray River Upper State School is a government primary (Prep-6) school for boys and girls at 1 Middle Murray Road (18.0899°S 145.8505°E). In 2016, the school had an enrolment of 45 students with 4 teachers (3 full-time equivalent) and 7 non-teaching staff (3 full-time equivalent). In 2018, the school had an enrolment of 31 students with 3 teachers and 6 non-teaching staff (3 full-time equivalent).

There are no secondary schools in Murray Upper. The nearest government secondary school is Tully State High School in Tully to the north-east.

== Attractions ==
Murray Falls are a cascade waterfall on the Murray River within the Girramay National Park and form part of the Wet Tropics World Heritage Area. The falls can be viewed from a boardwalk and viewing platform.
