= Cassowary Coast Region =

Coordinates: 18°05′40.79″S 145°51′05.18″E

- Local government area
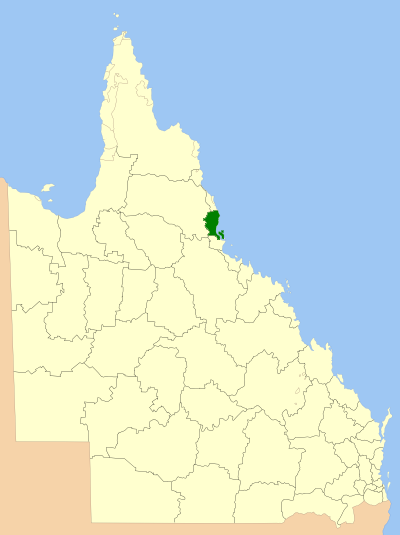
- Location within Queensland

- Interactive map of Cassowary Coast Region
- Country: Australia
- State: Queensland
- Region: Far North Queensland
- Established: 2008
- Council seat: Innisfail

Government
  - Mayor: Teresa Millwood
  - State electorate: Hill Hinchinbrook
  - Federal division: Kennedy

Area >
  - Total: 4,688 km^{2} (1,810 sq mi)

Population
  - Total: 29,157 (2021 census)
  - Density: 6.2195/km^{2} (16.1084/sq mi)
- Website: Cassowary Coast Region
LGAs around Cassowary Coast Region
Tablelands	Cairns
Tablelands	Cassowary Coast Region	Coral Sea
Charters Towers	Hinchinbrook

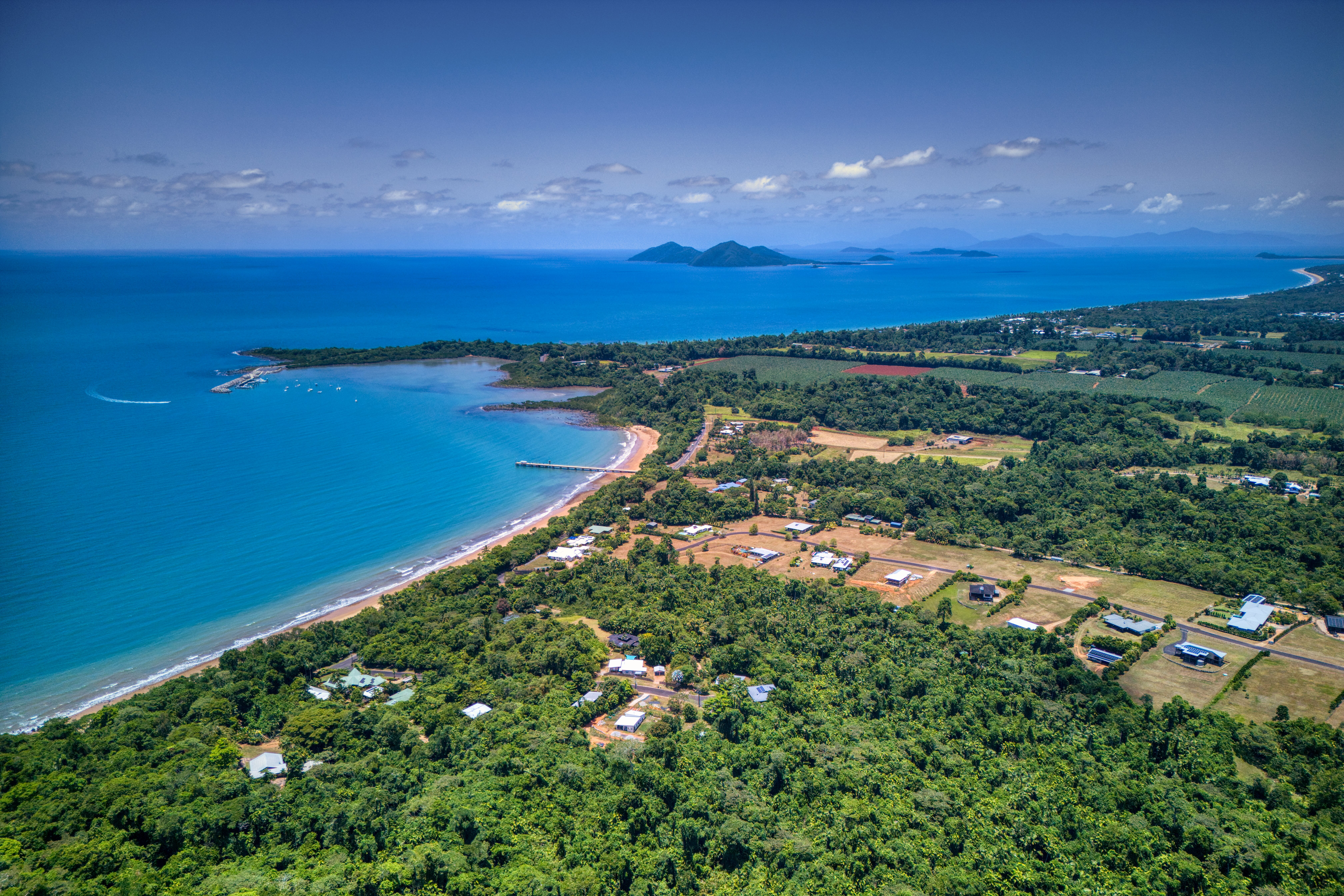
Mission Beach area, view from Bicton Hill lookout

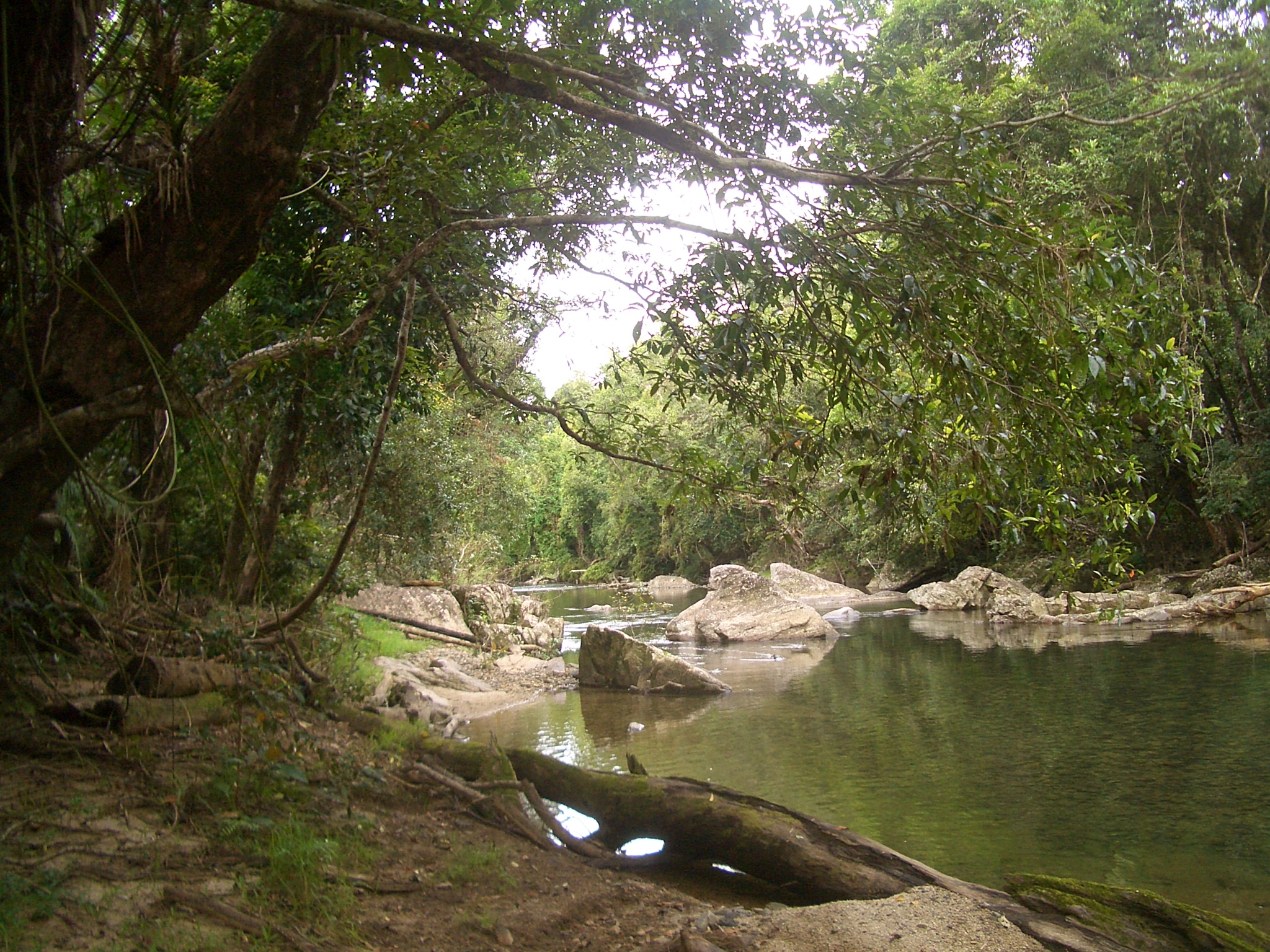
On the Liverpool Creek near Japoonvale (between Tully and Innisfail)

The Cassowary Coast Region is a local government area in the Far North Queensland region of Queensland, Australia, south of Cairns and centred on the towns of Innisfail, Cardwell and Tully. It was created in 2008 from a merger of the Shire of Cardwell and the Shire of Johnstone.

The Regional Council, which administers the region, has an estimated operating budget of A$64 million.

In the 2021 census, the Cassowary Coast Region had a population of 29,157 people.

== History ==
Prior to the 2008 amalgamation, the Cassowary Coast Region consisted of the entire area of two previous local government areas:

- Shire of Cardwell
- Shire of Johnstone

The Hinchinbrook Division was created on 11 November 1879 as one of 74 divisions around Queensland under the Divisional Boards Act 1879. On 28 October 1881, the Johnstone Division split away from it. On 18 January 1884, the Cardwell Division also split away. With the passage of the Local Authorities Act 1902, both Cardwell and Johnstone became shires on 31 March 1903.

In July 2007, the Local Government Reform Commission released its report and recommended that Cardwell and Johnstone merge. Cardwell was in particular opposed because Johnstone was rated as "financially distressed" and its council had just been sacked by the state government. On 15 March 2008, the two shires formally ceased to exist, and elections were held on the same day to elect six councillors and a mayor to the Regional Council.

== Mayors ==
- 2008–2016: Bill Shannon
- 2016–2020: John Kremastos
- 2020–2024: Timothy Mark Nolan
- 2024-present: Teresa Millwood

== Wards and councillors ==
Cassowary Coast Regional Council

Type
- Type: Unicameral

Leadership
- Mayor: Teresa Millwood, Independent
- Deputy Mayor: Nicholas Pervan, Independent

Structure
- Seats: 7 elected representatives, including a Mayor and 6 councillors
- Political groups: Majority: Independent (7)

Elections
- Last election: 16 March 2024
- Next election: 25 March 2028

Although the commission recommended the council be undivided with six councillors and a mayor, the gazetted form was that of six divisions each electing a single councillor, plus a mayor.

Below is the current council, elected in 2024:

Name	Ward	Notes
Teresa Millwood	Mayor	Mayor
Peter Reed	Division 1	
Ellen Jessop	Division 2	
Trudy Tschui	Division 3	
Nicholas Pervan	Division 4	Deputy Mayor
Jeff Baines	Division 5	
Renee McLeod	Division 6	

== Towns and localities ==
The Cassowary Coast Region includes the following settlements:

Greater Innisfail area:

- Innisfail
  - Belvedere
  - Cullinane
  - Eaton
  - East Innisfail
  - Eubenangee^{1}
  - Goondi
  - Goondi Bend
  - Goondi Hill
  - Hudson
  - Innisfail Estate
  - Jubilee Heights
  - Mighell
  - Palmerston^{2}
  - Ngatjan^{1}
  - South Innisfail
  - Sundown
  - Webb
  - Wooroonooran^{3}

Greater Tully area:

- Tully
  - Birkalla
  - Dingo Pocket
  - Silky Oak

Cardwell area:

- Cardwell
- Carruchan
- Bilyana
- Bulgun
- Cardstone
- Carmoo
- Coquette Point
- Damper Creek
- Djiru
- East Feluga
- Ellerbeck
- Euramo
- Feluga
- Hull Heads
- Jarra Creek
- Jumbun
- Kennedy
- Lower Tully
- Lumholtz
- Merryburn
- Midgenoo
- Murray Upper
- Murrigal
- Rockingham
- South Mission Beach
- Tam O'Shanter
- Tully Heads
- Walter Hill
- Wongaling Beach

Johnstone area:

- Basilisk
- Bingil Bay
- Camp Creek
- Comoon Loop
- Coconuts
- Coorumba
- Cowley
- Daradgee
- East Palmerston
- El Arish
- Etty Bay
- Fitzgerald Creek
- Flying Fish Point
- Garners Beach
- Garradunga
- Germantown
- Gulngai
- Japoonvale
- Kurrimine Beach
- Maria Creeks
- Mena Creek
- Midgeree Bar
- Mission Beach
- Moresby
- Mourilyan
- Mourilyan Harbour
- Mundoo
- New Harbourline
- Silkwood
- South Johnstone
- Vasa Views
- Wangan

^{1} - shared with Cairns Region
^{2} - shared with Tablelands Region
^{3} - shared with Cairns Region and Tablelands Region

== Libraries ==
The Cassowary Coast Regional Council operate public libraries in Cardwell, Tully (Dorothy Jones Library), Innisfail and Wongaling Beach.

== Demographics ==
The total population recorded at each census before the foundation of the Cassowary Coast Region combines the population of its component entities prior to their amalgamation in 2008. Its population was officially recorded for the first time in the 2011 Census.

Year	Population (Region total)	Population (Johnstone)	Population (Cardwell)
1933	17,193	12,777	4,416
1947	16,611	12,265	4,346
1954	20,025	14,980	5,045
1961	20,967	15,784	5,183
1966	22,169	16,529	5,640
1971	21,614	15,878	5,736
1976	23,254	16,776	6,478
1981	25,291	17,438	7,853
1986	26,123	17,457	8,666
1991	29,066	19,184	9,882
1996	30,604	20,474	10,130
2001	30,145	19,511	10,634
2006	29,501	18,917	10,584
2011	27,668		
2016	28,726		
2021	29,157		

In the 2016 census, the Cassowary Coast Region had a population of 28,726 people.

In the 2021 census, the Cassowary Coast Region had a population of 29,157 people. 32.0% described their ancestry as English. This is followed by 31.9% who described their ancestry as Australian, then Irish (10.6%), Italian (10.1%) and Australian Aboriginal at 8.9%. 79.9% spoke only English at home followed by the next most common languages: 2.8% Punjabi, 1.2% Italian, 0.8% Hmong, 0.5% Bislama and 0.4% Tagalog. Indigenous Australians were listed as making up 11% of the Cassowary Coast population.

== Heritage places ==
As part of preparing the Cassowary Coast Planning Scheme 2014, the council consulted with the region's heritage groups to compile a list of local heritage places.
