= Tully State School =

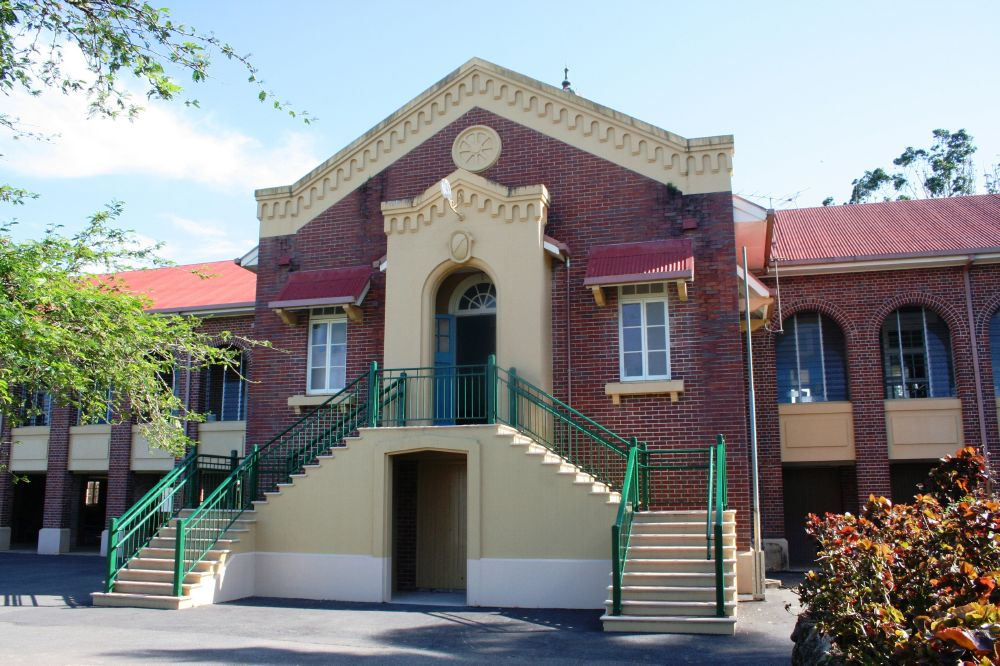
- Tully State School, 2011

- Location within Queensland Location within Australia
- 17.9388°S 145.9213°E
- Location: 17 Mars Street, Tully, Cassowary Coast Region, Queensland, Australia

History
- Design period: 1919–1930s (interwar period)
- Built: 1936–1937

Site notes
- Architect: Department of Public Works (Queensland)
- Architectural style: Classicism

Queensland Heritage Register
- Official name: Tully State School, Tully Rural School
- Type: state heritage (built)
- Designated: 13 January 1995
- Reference no.: 601577
- Significant period: 1930s (historical); 1930s (fabric); 1936–ongoing (social)
- Significant components: garden/grounds, school/school room

Tully State School is a heritage-listed state school at 17 Mars Street, Tully, Cassowary Coast Region, Queensland, Australia. It was designed by Department of Public Works (Queensland) and built from 1936 to 1937. It is also known as Tully Rural School. It was added to the Queensland Heritage Register on 13 January 1995.

== History ==
Tully State School was constructed in 1936–37 on the site of the original school, which was destroyed by fire.

The town of Tully (initially known as Banyan) was established in the early 1920s, following the Queensland Government's decision in 1922 to erect a sugar mill in the Tully River Valley. The mill buildings were erected 1924–25, and with the mill came the roads, railway, bridges and the township of Tully. The latter originated as a shanty town near Banyan Creek, but was surveyed as the town of Tully in April 1924.

A temporary state school was opened in a galvanised iron shed on the mill site on 30 June 1924, and a purpose-designed timber state school building was erected on the present school reserve in 1925–26.

In late 1932/early 1933, the Tully State School committee, encouraged by the district's rapid progress and the town's function as a regional centre, had agitated for the conversion of the school to a rural school. The rural school system had been introduced at Nambour State School in 1917. In this new form of vocational school, the younger grades followed the usual primary school curriculum, but in the upper grades, boys were taught manual arts, elementary agriculture and farm management, while girls were taught home management and needlework skills, in addition to the more usual academic studies. Rural school status was conferred on schools which drew on a wide regional population for enrolment, and for a town to acquire a rural school was something of a status symbol. Rural schools remained an important part of the education system until phased out in the 1960s, when state secondary education was being expanded.

By March 1934, the school committee had raised £200 toward the construction of manual training and domestic science facilities, and a new block was opened to students on 5 November 1934, at which time the school became Tully Rural School.

On 22 November 1935, Tully Rural School was destroyed by arson. The school was housed in temporary accommodation, firstly at the showgrounds, and then in the local Irish Club and CWA halls, until the present brick building was completed.

Plans for a new, substantial brick primary and rural school were prepared in the office of the Queensland Government Architect, Public Works Department. The Chief Architect at this time was Andrew Baxter Leven (1885–1966). Leven was born, educated and worked as an Inspector of Works in Scotland before migrating to Australia. From 1910 to 1951 he was employed by the Queensland Government Works Department and was Chief Architect and Quantity Surveyor from 1933 to 1951. Other members of the office involved in the design of the Tully Rural School were William Jestyn Moulds and Harold James Parr.

During the 1930s Depression a government-initiated works scheme was established to create employment. This involved the employment of architects, foremen, day labourers and the use of local materials in the design and construction of government buildings such as court houses, government offices and state schools. This scheme, under which the replacement Tully Rural School was constructed, was instigated by Labor Premier William Forgan Smith.

The new school cost approximately £13,000, and contained 8 classrooms, head teacher's room, cloakrooms, and male and female staffrooms. The area underneath was concreted to form a large sheltered play area.

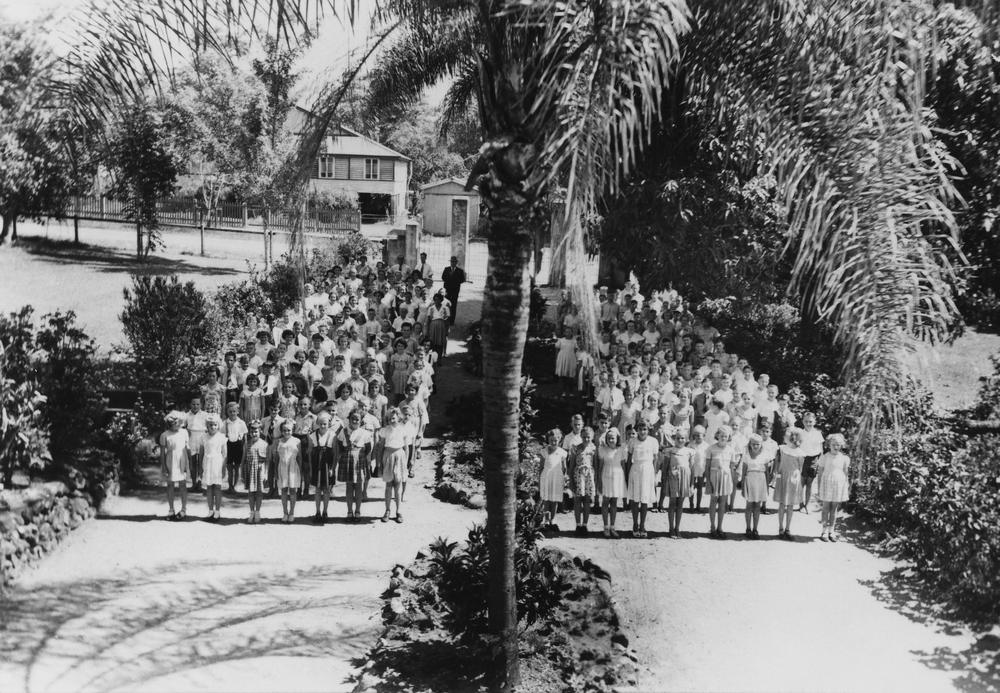
Gardens, circa 1952

The new building was occupied from the beginning of the 1938 school year, and was opened officially by Hon. Percy Pease, MLA for Herbert and Deputy Premier, on 1 February that year. A new head teacher, Charles Arthur Irish, was appointed, with instructions to turn Tully school into a real rural school. Some of the projects he initiated included: a forestry plot planted with Kauri and Hoop pines and Indian Teak; annual plantings in the school grounds, including a grove of maple (the gardens are now considered amongst the finest in Queensland state schools); poultry raising; a bushhouse of ferns; garden rock walling; and manual training programmes which supplied the school with blackboard frames, library cupboards, and other joinery. A theatre was built under the school, and a sports oval was developed adjacent to the forestry plot.

During the Second World War, student project clubs raised funds for the local Red Cross and Comfort Funds, with boys growing and selling vegetables, and girls cutting and selling flowers from the school gardens they tended. At this period the garden included over 300 rose bushes. Domestic Science students made clothing for the children of Britain, and large fetes were conducted annually, the proceeds of which were shared between the school and the patriotic societies.

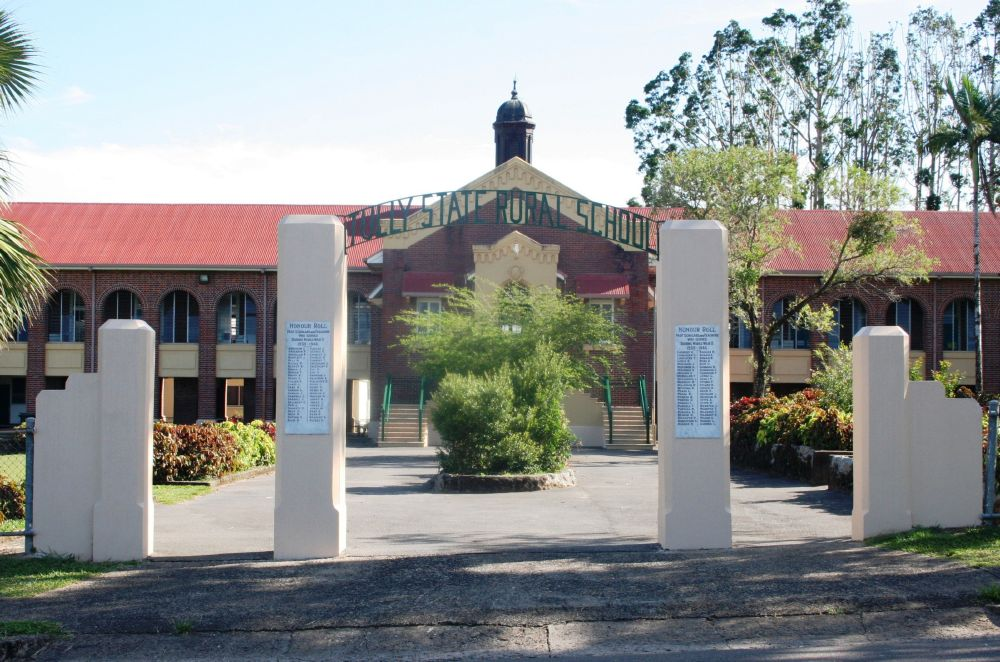
Memorial gates, 2011

After the war, Memorial Gates were erected; these list the past pupils and teachers who served with the armed forces during the Second World War.

A secondary department was established at Tully Rural School in 1951, in a temporary timber building, and this functioned until Tully State High School was erected at Tully in 1964. About this time, Tully Rural School reverted to Tully State School, but high school students continued to use the domestic science and manual arts facilities at the primary school for some years.

There have been a number of additional buildings erected at Tully State School since 1937, but these are not included in the heritage listing.

== Description ==
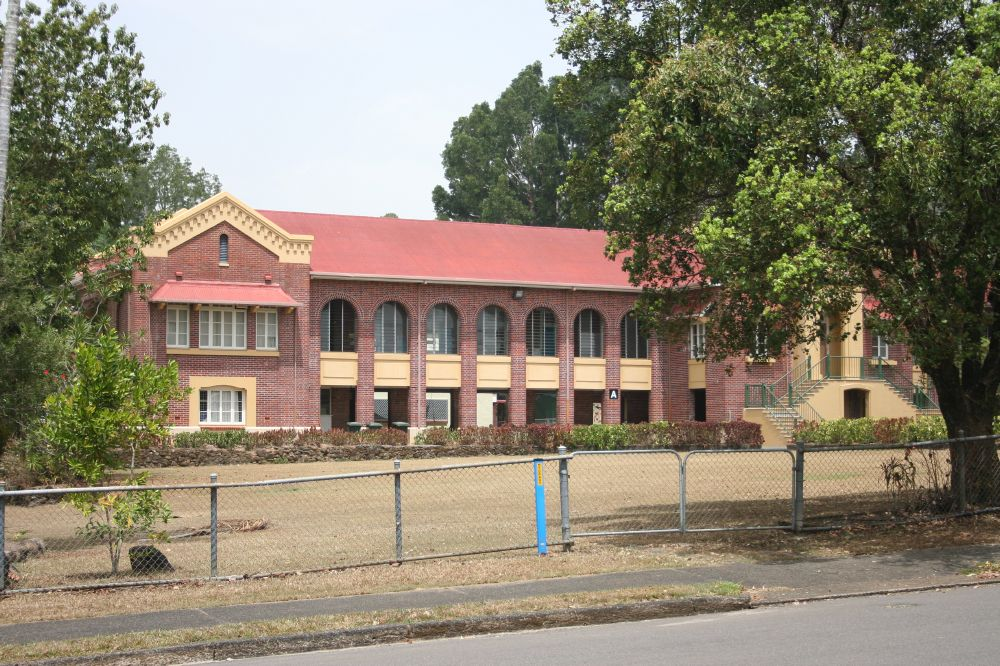
Arcaded verandahs, Tully State School, 2009

Tully State Rural School is a single-storeyed brick building with a corrugated iron roof, which is capped with a cupola. The building is elevated on brick piers which forms an undercroft playing area. The building has a central entrance gable and two end gables, which are decorated with a machicolation motif. The gables are connected by arcaded verandahs which have been enclosed.

The grounds are well tended and include substantial plantings of trees, palms and shrubs.

== Heritage listing ==
Tully State School was listed on the Queensland Heritage Register on 13 January 1995 having satisfied the following criteria.

The place is important in demonstrating the evolution or pattern of Queensland's history.

Tully State School, erected in 1936–37, is significant as a substantial interwar building which reflects Tully's growth and prosperity accompanying the expansion of the sugar industry in the 1930s. It also illustrates the State Government's commitment to Tully as a district service centre during the interwar period.

The place is important in demonstrating the principal characteristics of a particular class of cultural places.

Tully State School is significant as an excellent regional example of a school building designed for the North Queensland climate, being raised above an open undercroft; with wide verandahs and ventilators. The use of brick and restrained detailing is typical for government buildings of the period, and Tully State School follows in the tradition of fine buildings erected by the Queensland Public Works Department.

The place is important because of its aesthetic significance.

Tully State School follows in the tradition of fine buildings erected by the Queensland Public Works Department. It is an outstanding example of a school building designed by the office of the Queensland Government Architect, which at the time was the equal of any architectural office in Australia.
