= Mount Tyson =

Mountain in Queensland, Australia

- Location within Queensland

Highest point
- Elevation: 674 m (2,211 ft)
- Coordinates: 17.9232°S 145.9078°E

Geography
- Location: Walter Hill, Queensland, Australia

Mount Tyson is a mountain within the locality of Walter Hill near Tully within the Tully Gorge National Park in the Cassowary Coast Region in Far North Queensland, Australia. Mount Tyson rises 674 metres (2,211 ft).

== History ==
The mountain was named after James Tyson (1819-1898) pastoralist, who owned sugar growing properties in the area (Portion 256, Parish of Tyson) in 1881.

== See also ==
- List of mountains of Australia
