= Merryburn, Queensland =

Merryburn
- Suburb
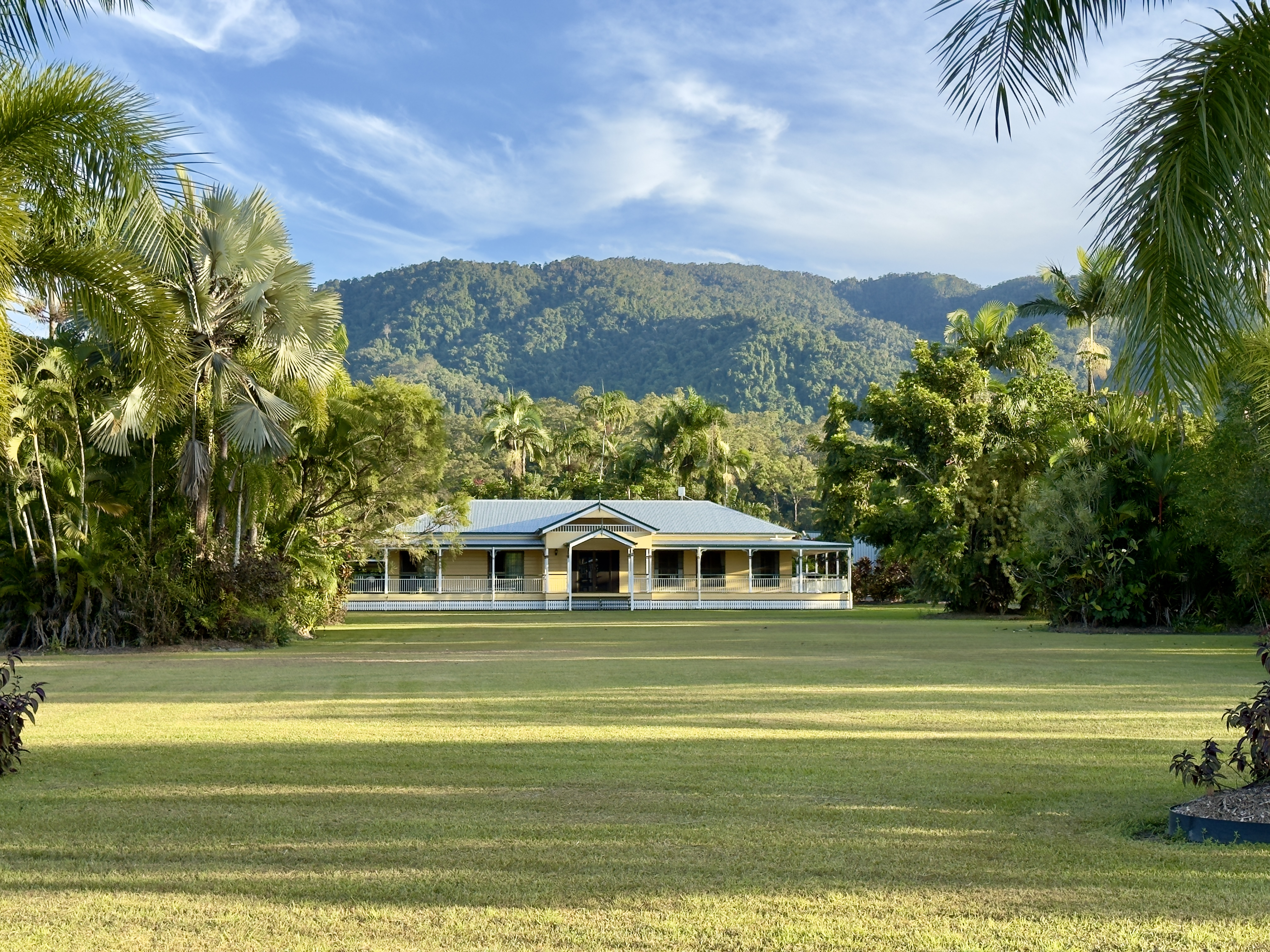
- Mount Mackay National Park seen from Merryburn, Queensland, 2025

- Interactive map of Merryburn
- Coordinates: 17.9166°S 145.9747°E
- Country: Australia
- State: Queensland
- LGA: Cassowary Coast Region
- Location: 7.8 km (4.8 mi) NE of Tully; 53.5 km (33.2 mi) S of Innisfail; 141 km (88 mi) S of Cairns; 214 km (133 mi) NW of Townsville; 1,564 km (972 mi) NNW of Brisbane

Government
  - State electorate: Hill
  - Federal division: Kennedy

Area
  - Total: 3.9 km^{2} (1.5 sq mi)

Population
  - Total: 189 (2021 census)
  - Density: 48.5/km^{2} (125.5/sq mi)
- Time zone: UTC+10:00 (AEST)
- Postcode: 4854
Suburbs around Merryburn
| Birkalla | Midgenoo | East Feluga |
| Birkalla | Merryburn | Mount Mackay |
| Mount Mackay | Mount Mackay | Mount Mackay |

Merryburn is a rural locality in the Cassowary Coast Region, Queensland, Australia. In the 2021 census, Merryburn had a population of 189 people.

== Geography ==
Tully - Mission Beach Road enters the locality from the west (Birkalla) and exits to the east (East Feluga / Mount Mackay).

== Demographics ==
In the 2016 census, Merryburn had a population of 184 people.

In the 2021 census, Merryburn had a population of 189 people.

== Education ==
There are no schools in Merryburn. The nearest government primary school is Feluga State School in Feluga to the north-west. The nearest government secondary school is Tully State High School in Tully to the south-west.
