= Koombooloomba Dam =

- Location of the dam wall in Queensland
- Interactive map of Koombooloomba Dam
- Country: Australia
- Location: Koombooloomba, Far North Queensland
- Coordinates: 17°49′53″S 145°36′15″E
- Purpose: Power
- Status: Operational
- Opening date: 1960
- Owner: CleanCo Queensland

Dam and spillways
- Type of dam: Gravity dam
- Impounds: Tully River
- Height: 40 m (130 ft)
- Length: 399 m (1,309 ft)
- Dam volume: 790×10^{3} m^{3} (28×10^{6} cu ft)
- Spillway type: Controlled
- Spillway capacity: 2,120 m^{3}/s (75,000 cu ft/s)

Reservoir
- Creates: Lake Koombooloomba
- Total capacity: 205,000 ML (166,000 acre⋅ft)
- Active capacity: 186,750 ML (151,400 acre⋅ft)
- Catchment area: 163 km^{2} (63 sq mi)
- Surface area: 1,555 ha (3,840 acres)
- Maximum water depth: 12.9 m (42 ft)

Kareeya Hydro Power Station
- Coordinates: 17°46′02″S 145°34′41″E
- Commission date: 1957
- Type: Run-of-the-river
- Pump-generators: 4
- Installed capacity: 86.4 MW (115,900 hp)
- Annual generation: 472 GWh (1,700 TJ)

Koombooloomba Hydro Power Station
- Coordinates: 17°50′S 145°36′E
- Commission date: 1999
- Type: Run-of-the-river
- Pump-generators: 1
- Installed capacity: 7.3 MW (9,800 hp)
- Annual generation: 22.5 GWh (81 TJ)

The Koombooloomba Dam is a concrete gravity dam across the Tully River at Koombooloomba, west of Tully and south, southeast of Ravenshoe in Far North Queensland, Australia. Built for the purpose of hydroelectric power generation, the dam creates the reservoir, Lake Koombooloomba.

== Location and features ==
The dam was constructed by the Queensland Government Co-ordinator-General's Department in 1960. The 790-thousand-cubic-metre (28×10^{6} cu ft) earth rock embankment dam wall is 399 metres (1,309 ft) in length and 40 metres (130 ft) high. The reservoir has a catchment area of 163 square kilometres (63 sq mi) with a controlled concrete spillway that releases up to 1,240 cubic metres per second (44,000 cu ft/s). The reservoir has a surface area of 1,555 hectares (3,840 acres) with an average depth of 12.9 metres (42 ft), and has a maximum capacity of 186,750 megalitres (151,400 acre⋅ft) of water, when full.

The dam and power generation facilities are owned and operated by CleanCo Queensland.

== Hydroelectric power facilities ==
Built in 1957, and upgraded in 2008, the underground run-of-the-river Kareeya Hydro Power Station was the first hydroelectric power station constructed on the Tully River. An intake tower is located in the Tully Falls Weir – a regulating pond for the power station – which directs water down a tunnel to the turbines below Tully Falls. Kareeya has a capacity of 86.4 megawatts (115,900 hp) and generates up to 472 gigawatt-hours (1,700 TJ) annually.

The run-of-the-river Koombooloomba Hydro Power Station is a dam release point situated on Koombooloomba Dam. The power station was commissioned in 1999 and has one turbo generator with a capacity of 7.3 megawatts (9,800 hp) that generates up to 22.5 gigawatt-hours (81 TJ). Its location on Koombooloomba Dam in the UNESCO World Heritage–listed Wet Tropics area put into use infrastructure established when the dam was constructed in 1960.

== See also ==
- List of dams in Queensland
