= Maadi, Queensland =

Maadi
- Suburb
- Interactive map of Maadi
- Coordinates: 17.8330°S 145.9911°E
- Country: Australia
- State: Queensland
- LGA: Cassowary Coast Region
- Location: 13.7 km (8.5 mi) NE of Tully; 40.1 km (24.9 mi) S of Innisfail; 127 km (79 mi) S of Cairns; 220 km (140 mi) NNW of Townsville; 1,663 km (1,033 mi) NNW of Brisbane

Government
  - State electorate: Hill
  - Federal division: Kennedy

Area
  - Total: 3.8 km^{2} (1.5 sq mi)
- Elevation: 20–250 m (66–820 ft)

Population
  - Total: 49 (2021 census)
  - Density: 12.89/km^{2} (33.4/sq mi)
- Time zone: UTC+10:00 (AEST)
- Postcode: 4855
Suburbs around Maadi
Shell Pocket	El Arish	El Arish
Gulngai	Maadi	Friday Pocket
Walter Hill	Djarawong	Friday Pocket

Maadi is a rural locality in the Cassowary Coast Region, Queensland, Australia. In the 2021 census, Maadi had a population of 49 people.

== Geography ==
The western and eastern sides of the locality are steep, rising to 210 metres (690 ft) to the west and to Mount Tippett (17.8365°S 146.0000°E) 265 metres (869 ft) above sea level to east. The centre of the locality is relatively low-lying at 30 metres (98 ft) or less.

The east and south-east of the locality are within the Walter Hill Range Conservation Park. Apart from this protected area, the lower lying land is used for crop growing (mostly sugarcane), rural residential housing, and grazing on native vegetation.

The North Coast railway line enters the locality from the south (Djarawong) and forms the south-eastern boundary of the locality. It exits to the north (El Arish). The locality was served by the now-abandoned Maadi railway station (17.8250°S 145.9981°E).

== History ==
The locality takes its name from a former railway station, named on 31 August 1922 by the Queensland Railways Department. The name is probably a corruption of the Palestinian place Maadan, a significant base area on the strategic railway built into the Sinai Peninsula in World War I, known to the Australian Light Horse units. Alternatively, the name may originate from Maadi (sometimes spelt Meadi), on the then edge of the desert south of Cairo, where Maadi (Meadi) Camp accommodated AIF Light Horse brigades when staying in Egypt during World War I.

== Demographics ==
In the 2016 census, Maadi had a population of 44 people.

In the 2021 census, Maadi had a population of 49 people.

== Education ==
There are no schools in Maadi. The nearest government primary schools are El Arish State School in neighbouring El Arish to the north and Feluga State School in Feluga to the south-west. The nearest government secondary school is Tully State High School in Tully to the south-west.
