= Jaffa, Queensland =

Jaffa
- Suburb
- Interactive map of Jaffa
- Coordinates: 17.7855°S 145.9930°E
- Country: Australia
- State: Queensland
- LGA: Cassowary Coast Region
- Location: 21.6 km (13.4 mi) NE of Tully; 36.2 km (22.5 mi) S of Innisfail; 123 km (76 mi) S of Cairns; 228 km (142 mi) NNW of Townsville; 1,586 km (985 mi) NNW of Brisbane

Government
  - State electorate: Hill
  - Federal division: Kennedy

Area
  - Total: 9.4 km^{2} (3.6 sq mi)
- Elevation: 20–260 m (66–853 ft)

Population
  - Total: 35 (2021 census)
  - Density: 3.72/km^{2} (9.64/sq mi)
- Time zone: UTC+10:00 (AEST)
- Postcode: 4855
Suburbs around Jaffa
Silkwood	Silkwood	Silkwood
No 4 Branch	Jaffa	Daveson
Gulngai	Shell Pocket	El Arish

Jaffa is a rural locality in the Cassowary Coast Region, Queensland, Australia. In the 2021 census, Jaffa had a population of 35 people.

== Geography ==
The southern and western parts of the locality are mountainous, rising to 260 metres (850 ft) above sea level. Most of this area forms part of the Japoon National Park, which extends into neighbouring localities of No. 4 Branch to the west and Guingai to the south-west. The highest point in the locality is Basils Peak (17.7968°S 145.9893°E).

The north and east of the locality are flatter land at around 20 metres (66 ft) above sea level and the land use is predominantly growing sugarcane.

The North Coast railway line enters the locality from the south-east (El Arish) and travels north forming the north-eastern boundary of the locality before exiting to the north-east (Silkwood). The locality was served by the now-abandoned Jaffa railway station (17.7802°S 146.0093°E).

There is a cane tramway network through the north and east of the locality which transports the harvested sugarcane to the local sugar mill for processing.

== History ==
The locality takes its name from the former Jaffa railway station, named on 24 March 1921 by the Queensland Railways Department after the Middle East city known to Australian troops from World War I, presumably reflecting the presence of a local soldier settlement.

== Demographics ==
In the 2016 census, Jaffa had a population of 18 people.

In the 2021 census, Jaffa had a population of 35 people.

== Education ==
There are no schools in Jaffa. The nearest government primary schools are El Arish State School in neighbouring El Arish to the south-east and Silkwood State School in neighbouring Silkwood to the north. The nearest government secondary school is Tully State High School in Tully to the south-west.
