= No. 4 Branch, Queensland =

No. 4 Branch
- Suburb
- Interactive map of No. 4 Branch
- Coordinates: 17.7733°S 145.9697°E
- Country: Australia
- State: Queensland
- LGA: Cassowary Coast Region
- Location: 31.2 km (19.4 mi) NE of Tully; 34.1 km (21.2 mi) SSW of Innisfail; 121 km (75 mi) SSE of Cairns; 237 km (147 mi) NNW of Townsville; 1,587 km (986 mi) NNW of Brisbane

Government
  - State electorate: Hill
  - Federal division: Kennedy

Area
  - Total: 21.9 km^{2} (8.5 sq mi)

Population
  - Total: 90 (2021 census)
  - Density: 4.11/km^{2} (10.6/sq mi)
- Time zone: UTC+10:00 (AEST)
- Postcode: 4856
Suburbs around No. 4 Branch
Japoonvale	Walter Lever Estate	Silkwood
Gulngai	No. 4 Branch	Jaffa
Gulngai	Gulngai	Gulngai

No. 4 Branch is a rural locality in the Cassowary Coast Region, Queensland, Australia. In the 2021 census, No. 4 Branch had a population of 90 people.

== Geography ==
Liverpool Creek bounds the locality to the north.

The south of the locality is within Japoon National Park which extends into neighbouring Gulngai and Jaffa. Apart from the protected area, the land use is predominantly crop growing (mostly sugarcane) with some grazing on native vegetation. There is a cane tramway network to transport the harvested sugarcane to the South Johnstone sugar mill.

== Demographics ==
In the 2016 census, No. 4 Branch had a population of 67 people.

In the 2021 census, No. 4 Branch had a population of 90 people.

== Education ==
There are no schools in No. 4 Branch. The nearest government primary school is Silkwood State School in neighbouring Silkwood to the north-east. The nearest government secondary school is Tully State High School in Tully. There is also a Catholic primary school in Tully.
