= Tully Court House =

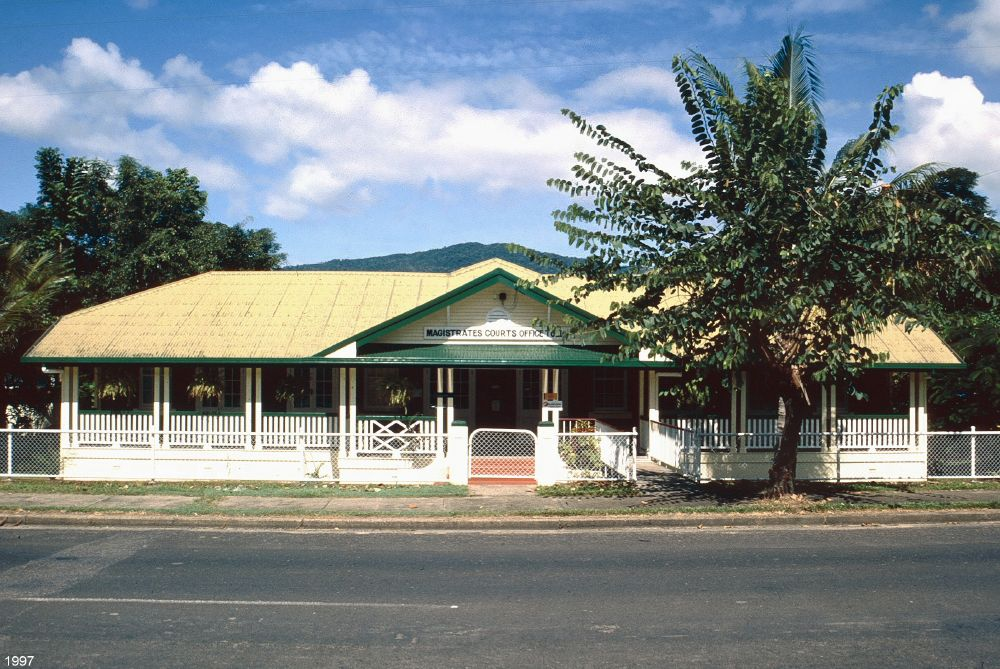
- Tully Court House, 2015

- Location within Queensland Location within Australia
- 17.9364°S 145.9231°E
- Location: 46 Bryant Street, Tully, Cassowary Coast Region, Queensland, Australia

History
- Design period: 1939–1945 (World War II)
- Built: 1941–1945

Site notes
- Architect: Nigel Laman Thomas of Department of Public Works (Queensland)
- Architectural style: Classicism

Queensland Heritage Register
- Official name: Tully Court House
- Type: state heritage (built)
- Designated: 24 September 1999
- Reference no.: 601703
- Significant period: 1940s (historical); 1940s (fabric); 1945–ongoing (social)
- Significant components: court house

Tully Court House is a heritage-listed courthouse at 46 Bryant Street, Tully, Cassowary Coast Region, Queensland, Australia. It was designed by Nigel Laman Thomas of the Department of Public Works (Queensland) and built from 1941 to 1945. It was added to the Queensland Heritage Register on 24 September 1999.

== History ==
A low-set, masonry building with timber verandahs, the Tully Courthouse was designed in 1941 during a period when Tully, and other sugar towns in Queensland were experiencing a development boom.

Chinese banana farmers had been clearing and farming along the Tully River from the early twentieth century but settlement in the vicinity of the township of Tully began in 1906 when James Savage selected land on Banyan Creek. The upper Banyan lands were opened for selection in 1912 and the area expanded rapidly after 1924 when the Tully Sugar Mill was erected and the railway extended to the area.

The survey of the town site of Tully, named after the Surveyor General William Alcock Tully in 1870, was completed in 1924. A provisional school was opened in a shed on the Mill site in 1924; the National Bank, the first bank in the town, opened in 1925; the Sugar Mill provided electricity for the town from 1927; Cardwell Shire offices opened in Tully in 1930; the town water supply was completed in 1933; and the Fire Brigade established in the 1940s.

Tully was gazetted under the Police Act as a Police District in January 1925 and the first police station was established in a one-room shack with a post to which prisoners were shackled. Tully was gazetted as a place for holding Courts of Petty Session in 1926 and a former post office building was removed from Banyan to Tully and functioned as a court building until the present Courthouse was completed in 1945.

A modest, low-set, T-shaped, masonry building with timber verandahs to each side, the Tully Courthouse was designed in 1941 as part of the extensive public works building program instigated by the Forgan Smith Government to counter the effects of the Depression. Construction was delayed by the outbreak of World War II and the building was finally erected in 1945.

The Tully Courthouse was designed by Nigel Laman Thomas, an architect in the Department of Public Works whose most notable work includes the former University of Queensland Library (now the Queensland University of Technology U block) at Gardens Point, Brisbane. Tully Courthouse displays formal architectural influences adapted to the tropical Tully climate. The layout and form of the building are characteristic of courthouse design of early twentieth century with a general office and associated offices off the front verandah and a single courtroom space surrounded by verandahs in the main body of the building. A well-composed building with formal qualities, symmetrical massing and repetitive rhythmic detailing give a sober, civic presence to the township.

The building has been in continuous use as a courthouse and public offices since 1945.

== Description ==
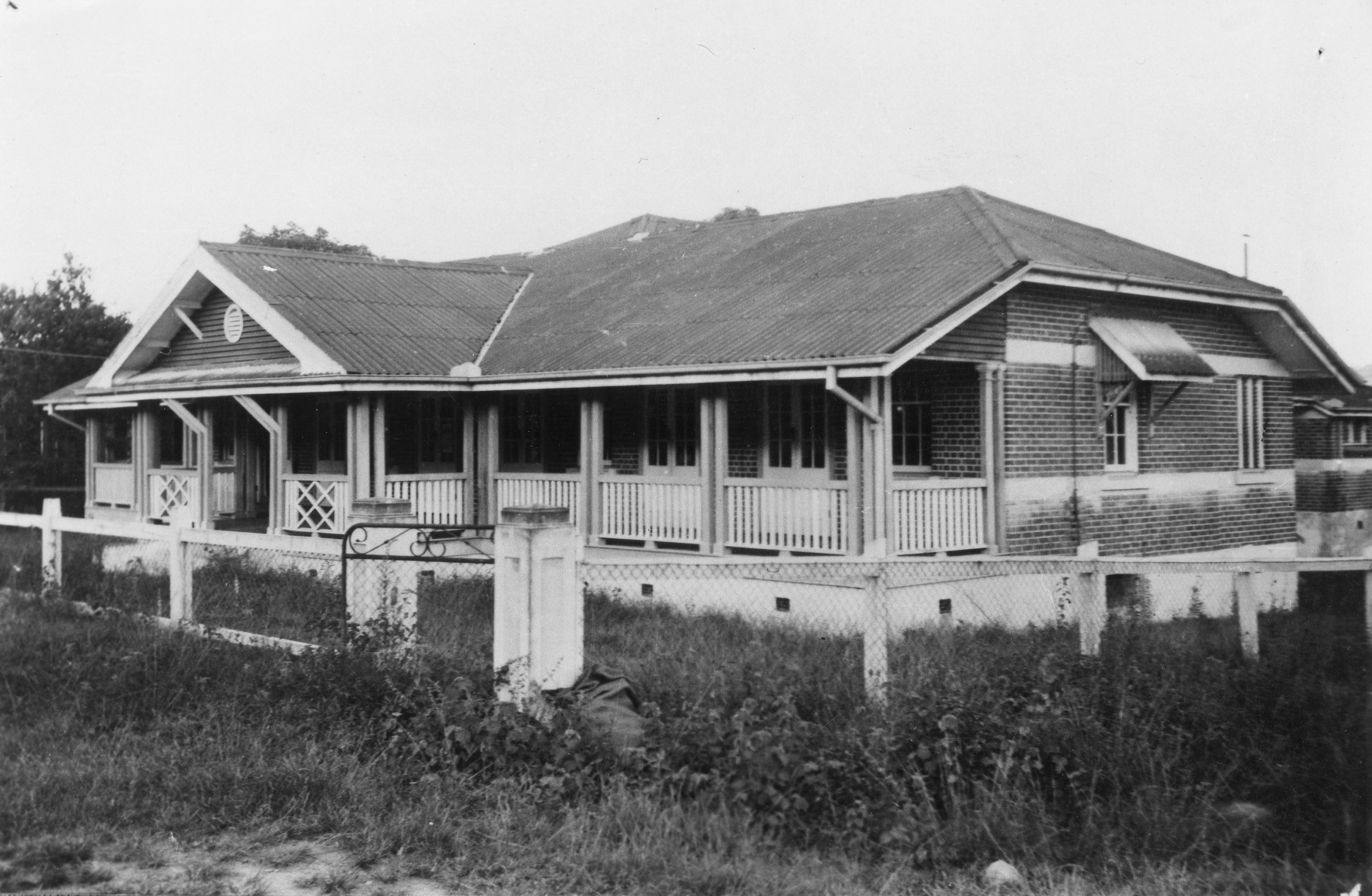
Tully Court House

A facebrick, T-shaped building on a low rendered brick base, the Tully Courthouse is symmetrical about a gabled front entry porch projecting from an open verandah. The gabled entry front has a central bullseye vent and crisscross balustrading to each side of entrance. The verandah is divided into bays by paired timber posts with decorative capitals and has vertical timber slat balustrading. On line with the entry stairs, two sets of French doors open from the general office and to each side there are two sets of French doors and six-pane sash windows opening from other offices. Horizontal bands of rendered brick extend around the building at window head and sill levels.

Two sets of French doors and three timber sash windows open from the courtroom onto each of the north and south verandahs which are both symmetrical about a set of plain timber stairs. The east verandah is symmetrical about a set of timber stairs onto a verandah with enclosed corner rooms which are accessed from the north and south verandahs. The posts and balustrading are similar on all verandahs. Externally the building is substantially intact.

Fence posts, consistent with the character and age of the building, survive marking the entrance to the site and a recent chain link fence borders that boundary of the site. A palm tree sits within the grounds of the building adjacent to the principal entrance and several other large trees surround the other three sides of the building.

== Heritage listing ==
Tully Court House was listed on the Queensland Heritage Register on 24 September 1999 having satisfied the following criteria.

The place is important in demonstrating the evolution or pattern of Queensland's history.

A modest, masonry building with discrete timber verandahs, the Tully Courthouse contributes a civic presence to the streetscape.

The Tully Courthouse is important for its association with law and order and the dispensing of justice in Tully since its construction in 1945. Part of a reserve of police and law enforcement buildings, the building demonstrates the early civic history of Tully.

The Tully Courthouse is important for its association with the development of Tully as a commercial and official centre for the surrounding farming district.

The place is important in demonstrating the principal characteristics of a particular class of cultural places.

The building demonstrates the principal characteristics of a courthouse building of the first half of the twentieth century and the design and plan illustrate the way in which an interwar courthouse operated.

The place has a strong or special association with a particular community or cultural group for social, cultural or spiritual reasons.

has special social value for the community for its continued use a public building.

The place has a special association with the life or work of a particular person, group or organisation of importance in Queensland's history.

The Tully Courthouse is important for its association with the work of Department of Public Works architect NL Thomas and is a fine example of interwar Queensland public works design.
