= Djarawong, Queensland =

Djarawong
- Suburb
- Interactive map of Djarawong
- Coordinates: 17.8666°S 145.9791°E
- Country: Australia
- State: Queensland
- LGA: Cassowary Coast Region
- Location: 9.9 km (6.2 mi) NE of Tully; 43.6 km (27.1 mi) SSW of Innisfail; 131 km (81 mi) S of Cairns; 216 km (134 mi) NNW of Townsville; 1,574 km (978 mi) NNW of Brisbane

Government
  - State electorate: Hill
  - Federal division: Kennedy

Area
  - Total: 8.6 km^{2} (3.3 sq mi)

Population
  - Total: 103 (2021 census)
  - Density: 11.98/km^{2} (31.0/sq mi)
- Time zone: UTC+10:00 (AEST)
- Postcode: 4854
Suburbs around Djarawong
Walter Hill	Maadi	Friday Pocket
Walter Hill	Djarawong	Friday Pocket
Feluga	East Feluga	East Feluga

Djarawong is a rural locality in the Cassowary Coast Region, Queensland, Australia. In the 2021 census, Djarawong had a population of 103 people.

== Geography ==
The Bruce Highway enters the locality from the south (Feluga / East Feluga) and exits to the north-west (Friday Pocket). The North Coast railway line enters the locality from south (Feluga) to the immediate west of the highway and exits to the north (Maadi) remaining immediately west of the highway. Djarawong railway station once servied the locality, but now is an abandoned railway station on the line (17.8708°S 145.9776°E).

The land ranges from 28 metres (92 ft) above sea level in the south of the locality rising to 244 metres (801 ft) in the north of the locality, but there are no named peaks.

The north-east of the locality is within the Japoon National Park. The land in the flatter southern part of the locality is predominantly used for growing sugarcane, while the higher elevations are used for grazing on native vegetation and rural residential housing. There are also cane tramways in the locality for transporting the harvested sugarcane to the local sugar mill.

== History ==
Djarawong railway station was named by the Queensland Railways Department on 4 December 1924. It is an Aboriginal name referring to a local scrub tree.

== Demographics ==
In the 2016 census, Djarawong had a population of 102 people.

In the 2021 census, Djarawong had a population of 103 people.

== Education ==
There are no schools in Djarawong. The nearest government primary school is Feluga State School in neighbouring Feluga to the south-west. The nearest government secondary school is Tully State High School in Tully to the south-west.
