= Tully River =

River in Queensland, Australia

Tully
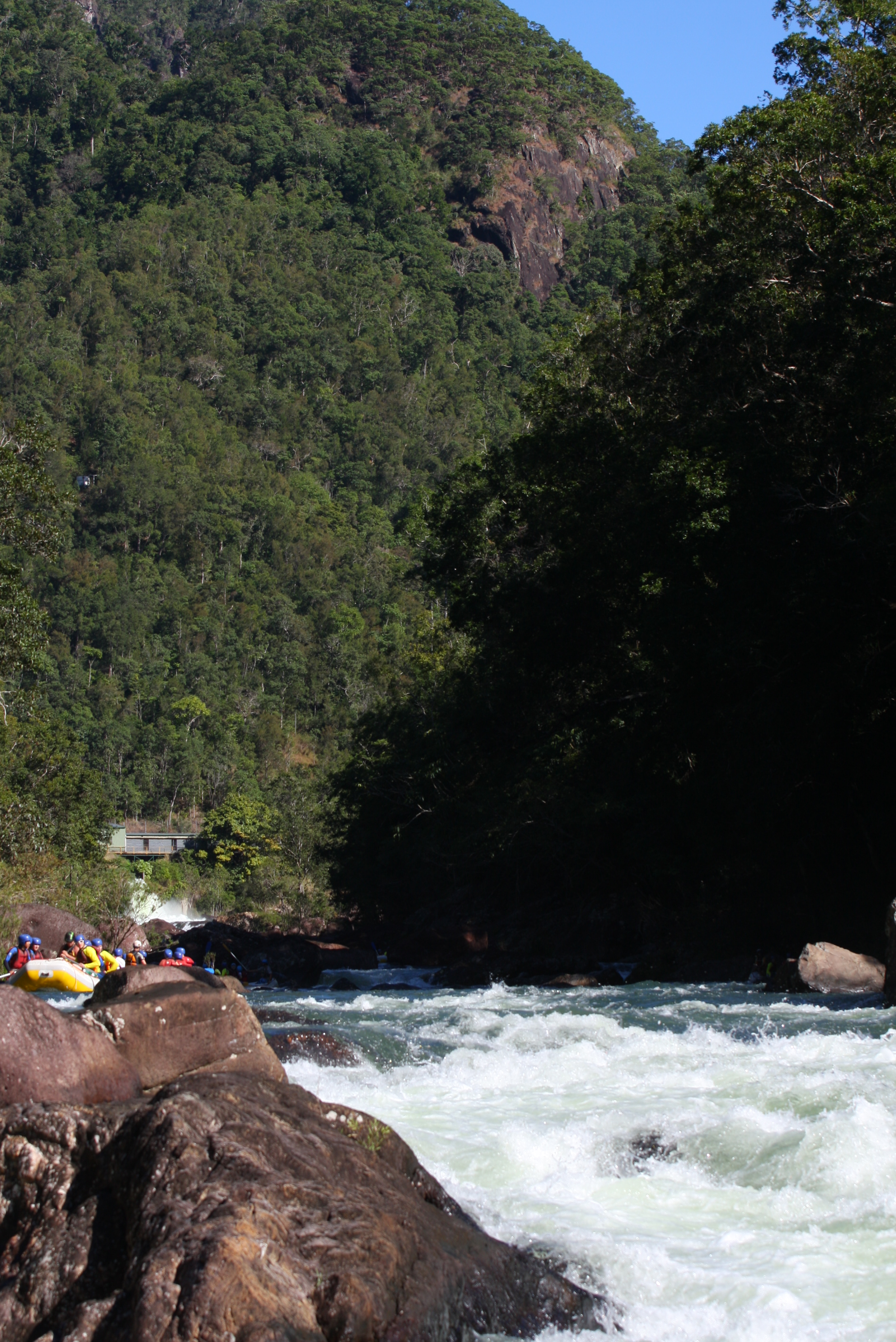
- The Tully River, 2009

- Location of Tully River mouth in Queensland
- Etymology: In honour of William Alcock Tully

Location
- Country: Australia
- State: Queensland
- Region: Far North Queensland, Wet Tropics of Queensland
- City: Tully

Physical characteristics
- Source: Cardwell Range, Great Dividing Range
  - location: Kirrama State Forest
  - coordinates: 17°58′53″S 145°37′18″E
  - elevation: 800 m (2,600 ft)
- Mouth: Coral Sea
  - location: Tully Heads
  - coordinates: 18°01′55″S 146°03′25″E
  - elevation: 0 m (0 ft)
- Length: 133 km (83 mi)
- Basin size: 1,650 km^{2} (640 sq mi) to 1,508.5 km^{2} (582.4 sq mi)
- Discharge
  - location: Near mouth
  - average: 72.2 m^{3}/s (2,280 GL/a)

Basin features
- Tributaries
  - left: Nitchaga Creek, Jarra Creek
  - right: Cochable Creek, Davidson Creek, Echo Creek
- National park: Tully Gorge National Park

The Tully River is a river in Far North Queensland, Australia.

== Course and features ==
The Tully River rises in the Cardwell Range, part of the Great Dividing Range on the northern boundary of the Kirrama State Forest. The river flows generally north through Lake Koombooloomba and flows over the Tully Falls near Ravenshoe and descends through the Tully Gorge within the Tully Gorge National Park, part of the UNESCO World Heritage-listed Wet Tropics site. Below the dam wall, the river is joined by five minor tributaries before emptying into the Coral Sea at Tully Heads. The river descends 800 metres (2,600 ft) over its 133-kilometre (83 mi) course.

== People and land use ==
The Tully, together with the Herbert and the Burdekin rivers, were part of the proposed Bradfield Scheme to divert the upper reaches of the three rivers west of the Great Dividing Range and into the Thomson River designed to irrigate and drought-proof much of the western Queensland interior, as well as large areas of South Australia. The Scheme was proposed in 1938 and abandoned in 1947.

At the Koombooloomba Dam, the Koombooloomba Hydro Power Station and a little further downriver, the Kareeya Hydro Power Station, generate hydroelectric power from the flow of the river.

In 2007 there was a white water rafting accident which took the life of 22-year-old Townsville woman at Tully Gorge. Another man drowned at Tully Gorge while rafting on 14 February 2009. A 2012 inquest into five deaths on the river due to rafting incidents that occurred between July 2007 and February 2009 recommended that each rapid be risk assessed and that a code of practice be adopted for the industry.

== Etymology ==
The river was named in honour of William Alcock Tully, Surveyor General of Queensland from 1875 to 1889.

== See also ==
- List of rivers of Australia § Queensland
