= Friday Pocket, Queensland =

Friday Pocket
- Suburb
- Interactive map of Friday Pocket
- Coordinates: 17.8475°S 146.0008°E
- Country: Australia
- State: Queensland
- LGA: Cassowary Coast Region
- Location: 18.4 km (11.4 mi) NE of Tully; 41.9 km (26.0 mi) S of Innisfail; 129 km (80 mi) S of Cairns; 229 km (142 mi) NNW of Townsville; 1,589 km (987 mi) NNW of Brisbane

Government
  - State electorate: Hill
  - Federal division: Kennedy

Area
  - Total: 10.2 km^{2} (3.9 sq mi)
- Elevation: 16–324 m (52–1,063 ft)

Population
  - Total: 39 (2021 census)
  - Density: 3.82/km^{2} (9.90/sq mi)
- Time zone: UTC+10:00 (AEST)
- Postcode: 4855
Suburbs around Friday Pocket
Maadi	El Arish	Granadilla
Maadi	Friday Pocket	Granadilla
Djarawong	East Feluga	Granadilla

Friday Pocket is a rural locality in the Cassowary Coast Region, Queensland, Australia. In the 2021 census, Friday Pocket had a population of 39 people.

== Geography ==
The Walter Hill Range runs from the north-west to the south-west of the locality and then forms the south-western and southern boundary of the locality. The only named peak in the locality is Mount Myrtle in the south of the locality (17.8663°S 146.0004°E) rising 324 metres (1,063 ft) above sea level, the highest point in the locality. The land falls away from the range to the east with the lowest part of the locality being 16 metres (52 ft) above sea level. A number of creeks rise on the eastern side of the Walter Hill Range and flow towards the locality's eastern boundary.

To the west of the range, the land also falls away towards Smiths Gap, which loosely bounds the locality to the west. The Bruce Highway and North Coast railway line both enter the locality from the south-west (Djarawong), passing through Smiths Gap before exiting to the north-west (Maadi).

In the west of the locality is part of the Walter Hill Range Conservation Park, while in the south-west of the locality is the Japoon National Park extending into neighbouring Djarawong. Apart from these protected areas, the lower land in the east of the locality is used for growing crops (predominantly sugarcane) with some rural residential housing and grazing on native vegetation. There are cane tramways in the north of the locality to transport the harvested sugarcane to the local sugar mill. The higher land around the range to the south and west is mostly undeveloped bushland.

== History ==
Settlement in Friday Pocket occurred in the late 1920s and early 1930s with the development of roads and bridges into the area. In 1933, there were 35 farmers in the area were supplying 12,000 to 15,000 tons of sugarcane each year to the Tully sugar mill.

== Demographics ==
In the 2016 census, Friday Pocket had a population of 40 people.

In the 2021 census, Friday Pocket had a population of 39 people.

== Education ==
There are no schools in Friday Pocket. The nearest government primary school is El Arish State School in neighbouring El Arish to the north. The nearest government secondary school is Tully State High School in Tully to the south-west.
