= Gulngai, Queensland =

Gulngai
- Suburb
- Interactive map of Gulngai
- Coordinates: 17.7483°S 145.8119°E
- Country: Australia
- State: Queensland
- LGA: Cassowary Coast Region
- Location: 31.7 km (19.7 mi) NW of Tully; 85.3 km (53.0 mi) SW of Innisfail; 173 km (107 mi) S of Cairns; 238 km (148 mi) NNW of Townsville; 1,573 km (977 mi) NNW of Brisbane

Government
  - State electorate: Hill
  - Federal division: Kennedy

Area
  - Total: 272.5 km^{2} (105.2 sq mi)
- Elevation: 20–1,068 m (66–3,504 ft)

Population
  - Total: 0 (2021 census)
  - Density: 0.0000/km^{2} (0.000/sq mi)
- Time zone: UTC+10:00 (AEST)
- Postcode: 4855
Suburbs around Gulngai
Palmerston	Mamu	Japoonvale
Koombooloomba	Gulngai	No 4 Branch; Jaffa
Walter Hill	Walter Hill	Shell Pocket; Maadi

Gulngai is a rural locality in the Cassowary Coast Region, Queensland, Australia. In the 2021 census, Gulngai had "no people or a very low population".

Gulngai's postcode is 4855.

== Geography ==
The locality is bounded by the ridgeline of the Walter Hill Range (midpoint 17.75°S 145.8°E) to the south-west. The ridgeline forms a drainage divide with the creeks rising on the range within Gulngai contributing to the Johnstone River basin which enters the Coral Sea between Flying Fish Point and Coquette Point. There are two named peaks on the ridgeline:

- Mount Coleridge (17.7677°S 145.8188°E) at 858 metres (2,815 ft) above sea level
- Mount Marquette (17.8158°S 145.8475°E) at 1,068 metres (3,504 ft) above sea level

with the terrain falling to 20 metres (66 ft) above sea level on the boundary with Japoonvale.

The entire locality is a protected area with the north of the locality within the Wooroonooran National Park and the south of the locality within the Japoon National Park.

There is only one road in the locality, Sutties Gap Road, which passes through the north-western corner of the locality, entering from Mamu to the north and exiting to Koombooloomba / Palmerston in the north-west.

== History ==
The Walter Hill Range was named by explorer George Elphinstone Dalrymple on 7 October 1873, after botanist Walter Hill, a member of Dalyrmple's 1873 expedition from Cardwell to the Endeavour River and the first curator of the Brisbane City Botanic Gardens.

The locality was officially named and bounded on 21 January 2000.

== Demographics ==
In the 2016 census, Gulngai had "no people or a very low population".

In the 2021 census, Gulngai had "no people or a very low population".
