= Golden Gumboot =

Coordinates: 17°56′01.72″S 145°55′41.02″E

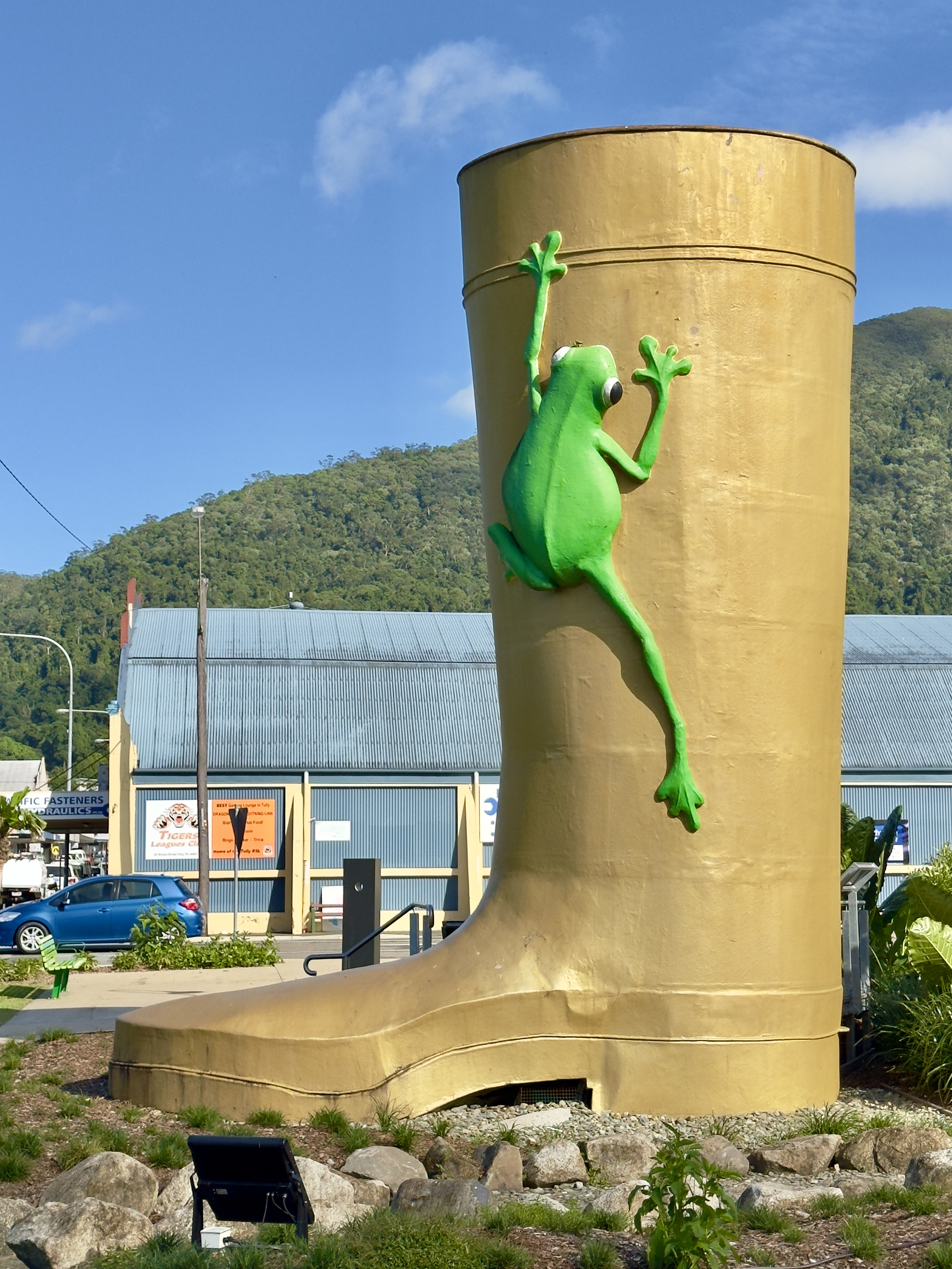
- The Golden Gumboot at Tully. The Golden Gumboot stands just outside the town's main street.
- Interactive map of the Golden Gumboot area

General information
- Location: Tully, Queensland
- Opened: 10 May 2003

Height
- Height: 7.9 metres (25.9 ft)

Technical details
- Structural system: Fibreglass over steel frame

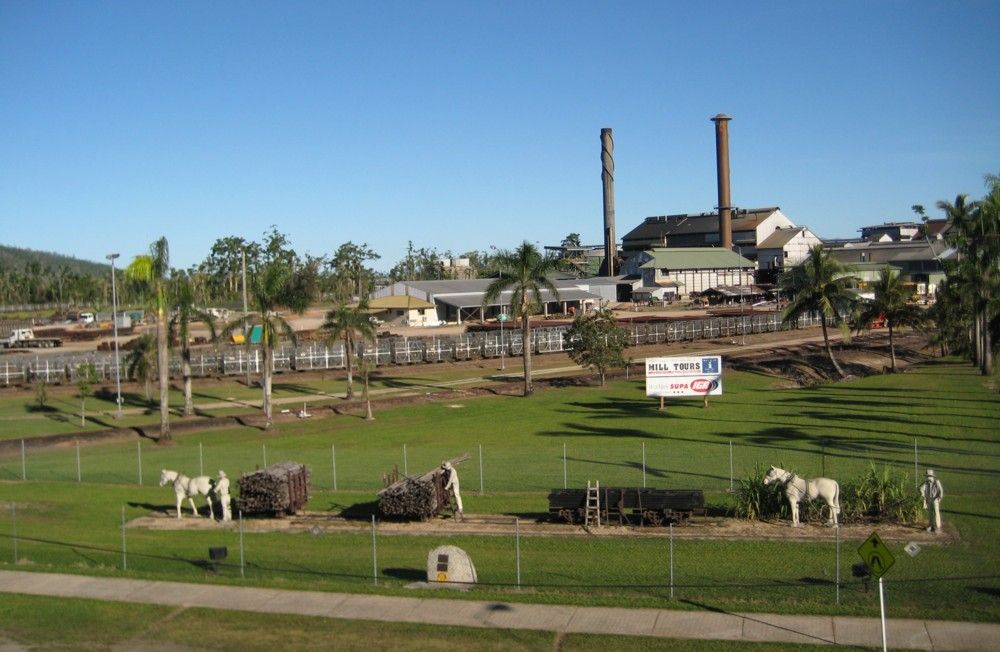
The view of Tully Sugar Mill from the top of the Golden Gumboot

The Golden Gumboot is a competition among the Far North Queensland towns of Tully, Innisfail, and Babinda in Australia for the wettest town of Australia. These towns are located in the Wet Tropics and on land that was previously covered by rainforest, and experience some of the highest levels of rainfall in Australia through monsoonal rain and cyclones. The winner of the competition (since 1970) is awarded a rubber boot.

== Structure ==
Despite the fact that Babinda has had more rainfall than Tully in the last 40 years, The Golden Gumboot monument was opened in Tully by the Tully Lions and Rotary Clubs in May 2003. The project cost, including in-kind contributions, was $90,000. The boot is 7.9 metres (25.9 ft) and represents the record rainfall for Tully in 1950.

The boot is made of fibreglass. It has a spiral staircase to the top of the boot that allows a view of the town. Historical photographs of floods in the district are displayed on the walls inside the boot for visitors to view as they climb to the top. The Gumboot was designed, fabricated and installed by Brian Newell.

Tully holds a Golden Gumboot Festival annually.

The Golden Gumboot was closed after Cyclone Yasi in 2011. It was reopened early in 2012 by Andrew Fraser, the Acting Premier of Queensland. Restoration was funded through an insurance claim and a $20,000 donation.

== See also ==
- Australia's big things
- Big Dreamers
