= Shell Pocket, Queensland =

Shell Pocket
- Suburb
- Interactive map of Shell Pocket
- Coordinates: 17.8163°S 145.9827°E
- Country: Australia
- State: Queensland
- LGA: Cassowary Coast Region
- Location: 17.7 km (11.0 mi) NE of Tully; 38.7 km (24.0 mi) S of Innisfail; 126 km (78 mi) S of Cairns; 224 km (139 mi) NW of Townsville; 1,573 km (977 mi) NNW of Brisbane

Government
  - State electorate: Hill
  - Federal division: Kennedy

Area
  - Total: 5.4 km^{2} (2.1 sq mi)

Population
  - Total: 83 (2021 census)
  - Density: 15.37/km^{2} (39.8/sq mi)
- Time zone: UTC+10:00 (AEST)
- Postcode: 4855
Suburbs around Shell Pocket
Gulngai	Jaffa	El Arish
Gulngai	Shell Pocket	Maadi
Gulngai	Maadi	Maadi

Shell Pocket is a rural locality in the Cassowary Coast Region, Queensland, Australia. In the 2021 census, Shell Pocket had a population of 83 people.

== Geography ==
Shell Pocket is situated between the mountains of the Great Dividing Range on either side and Big Maria Creek in the valley below. Many spring fed streams sourced in the mountains feed the waterway and, beside the high rainfall, ensure permanent water all year round. Like most of the Wet Tropics region in Far North Queensland, Shell Pocket mainly produces sugarcane.

== Demographics ==
In the 2016 census, Shell Pocket had a population of 91 people.

In the 2021 census, Shell Pocket had a population of 83 people.

== Education ==
There are no schools in Shell Pocket. The nearest government primary school is El Arish State School in neighbouring El Arish to the east. The nearest government secondary school is Tully State High School in Tully to the south-west.
