= Birkalla, Queensland =

Birkalla
- Suburb
- Interactive map of Birkalla
- Coordinates: 17.9136°S 145.9488°E
- Country: Australia
- State: Queensland
- LGA: Cassowary Coast Region
- Location: 3.9 km (2.4 mi) NE of Tully; 49.9 km (31.0 mi) SSW of Innisfail; 137 km (85 mi) S of Cairns; 210 km (130 mi) NNW of Townsville; 1,568 km (974 mi) NNW of Brisbane

Government
  - State electorate: Hill
  - Federal division: Kennedy

Area
  - Total: 7.8 km^{2} (3.0 sq mi)

Population
  - Total: 156 (2021 census)
  - Density: 20.00/km^{2} (51.8/sq mi)
- Time zone: UTC+10:00 (AEST)
- Postcode: 4854
Suburbs around Birkalla
Bulgun	Midgenoo	Midgenoo
Bulgun	Birkalla	Merryburn
Tully	Tully	Mount Mackay

Birkalla is a rural locality in the Cassowary Coast Region, Queensland, Australia. In the 2021 census, Birkalla had a population of 156 people.

== Geography ==
The locality is located immediately north of Tully. The North Coast railway line and Bruce Highway run immediately parallel from Tully to the south through the locality, exiting to Midgenoo to the north.

== Demographics ==
In the 2016 census, Birkalla had a population of 125 people.

In the 2021 census, Birkalla had a population of 156 people.

== Education ==
There are no schools in Birkalla. The nearest government primary schools are Tully State School in neighbouring Tully to the south-east and Feluga State School in Feluga to the north. The nearest government secondary school is Tully State High School, also in Tully.
