= East Feluga, Queensland =

East Feluga
- Suburb
- Interactive map of East Feluga
- Coordinates: 17.8961°S 145.9938°E
- Country: Australia
- State: Queensland
- LGA: Cassowary Coast Region
- Location: 11.3 km (7.0 mi) NE of Tully; 47.6 km (29.6 mi) SW of Innisfail; 135 km (84 mi) S of Cairns; 217 km (135 mi) NNW of Townsville; 1,579 km (981 mi) NNW of Brisbane

Government
  - State electorate: Hill
  - Federal division: Kennedy

Area
  - Total: 22.7 km^{2} (8.8 sq mi)

Population
  - Total: 266 (2021 census)
  - Density: 11.72/km^{2} (30.35/sq mi)
- Time zone: UTC+10:00 (AEST)
- Postcode: 4854
Suburbs around East Feluga
Djarawong	Friday Pocket	Granadilla
Feluga; Midgenoo	East Feluga	Granadilla
Merryburn	Mount Mackay	Mount Mackay

East Feluga is a rural locality in the Cassowary Coast Region, Queensland, Australia. In the 2021 census, East Feluga had a population of 266 people.

== Geography ==
The locality is bounded to the east by the Walter Hall Range, to the south by the Tully Mission Beach Road, and to the north-west by the North Coast railway line and Bruce Highway which run immediately parallel from Midgenoo to Djarawong.

The land use is predominantly growing sugarcane and there is a cane tramway network to transport the harvested sugarcane to the Tully sugar mill for processing. There is some rural residential housing, mostly at the base of the Walter Hall Range.

== History ==
As of mid-1926, there were several farmers living to the east of the Feluga railway station who decided to band together to have a tram line constructed to transport their produce to the station rather than continuing to use trucks, and by September that year the "East Feluga tramline" had been completed.

In August 1928, a tennis team which described itself as representing East Feluga played a team from El Arish, and in early 1929 a report described East Feluga as being a district three miles east of the Feluga railway station on the slopes of Walter Hill Range with about a dozen settlers mostly growing bananas, with some growing mixed fruits, and struggling to clear their blocks of land. It had one major road leading to Feluga but it was noted that this road was often in a very poor state and unusable during the wet season and it was hoped the Cardwell Shire Council could improve it. As of February there was a Progress Association of East Feluga which was advocating for improvement of the road and promoting the welfare of East Feluga and its residents by raising publicity of the settlement.

In November 1930, repairs to East Feluga road conducted by the Shire Council were completed and much of the area had been cleared of scrub leaving it looking like farmland. In 1931 the Rockingham Farmer's Association raised the need for a road from East Feluga to the coast and decided to make a request for one to be constructed by approaching the Shire Council, the member for Herbert, and the Silkwood Butter Factory directorate, and a request was also made of the Council that the East Feluga farmers be granted permits to grow a small amount of sugar cane as bananas had proven to not be as profitable as expected. It was estimated there were twenty-two farmers living in East Feluga as of September 1931.

In June 1932, delegates from East Feluga were able to participate in a Cardwell Shire conference. In early 1933 a report heavily criticized the outgoing Moore government's treatment of East Feluga settlers, describing them as victims of four years of broken promises due to permits to grow sugar cane never being granted, however in response an official of the Moore government noted that any promise of cane permits would have been made by the preceding McCormack government and argued that the Moore government was never made aware of such a promise and had not made such a promise itself. As of June 1933 sugarcane was being grown in East Feluga with East Feluga farmers participating in a canegrowers meeting in Tully, and an East Feluga side began competing in the Chesney Shield which was a Tully Tennis competition.

In February 1934, flooding severely damaged the roads of East Feluga with Chris Teitzel, chairman of the Cardwell Shire Council, visiting the area personally to inspect them. In order to secure funding for road repairs East Feluga farmers would need to pay a fee to the council to become classified as a "No. 2 Division" (which meant a sugar growing area), however at a Cardwell Shire Council meeting Council member Peter White argued that this would be creating unnecessary hardship and that the roads should be repaired regardless of the settlements classification. As a result, it was instead proposed for a subsidized 2000 pound flood damage loan to be taken by the council to cover the cost of repairs across the region, and in May 1934 work on establishing a brand new road to East Feluga was begun. In June 1934 the Cardwell Shire Council offered a tender of 30 pounds for making improvements to the Djarawong reserve which was to serve as a recreational site for residents of East Feluga, Feluga, Djarawong, and Midgenoo. In July 1934 the Deputy and at the time Acting Premier of Queensland, Percy Pease, visited East Feluga with a ministerial party and met with a deputation representing the East Feluga Progress Association, and after his visit it was arranged for the Chief Inspector of the Lands Department to visit to determine the position of local farmers in relation to relief in land rental fees with the Inspector visiting later the same month. In December 1934 settlers began establishing dairy cattle in East Feluga aiming to supply milk to the Silkwood butter factory.

== Demographics ==
In the 2016 census, East Feluga had a population of 245 people.

In the 2021 census, East Feluga had a population of 266 people.

== Education ==
There are no schools in East Feluga. The nearest government primary school is Feluga State School in neighbouring Feluga to the west. The nearest government secondary school is Tully State High School in Tully to the south-west.
