= Tully Falls =

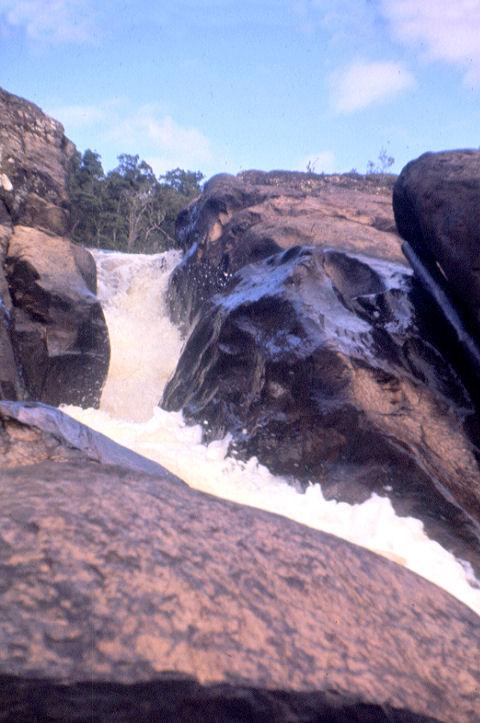
- Tully Falls, in 1959

- Location within Queensland
- Location: Far North Queensland, Australia
- Coordinates: 17°47′00″S 145°34′00″E
- Type: Horsetail chute
- Elevation: 673 metres (2,208 ft) AHD
- Total height: 180–210 metres (590–690 ft)
- Number of drops: 1
- Watercourse: Tully River

The Tully Falls, a horsetail chute waterfall on the Tully River, is located in the UNESCO World Heritage-listed Wet Tropics in the Far North region of Queensland, Australia. It formed the eastern boundary of the Dyirbal.

== Location and features ==
From the Atherton Tableland at an approximate elevation of 673 metres (2,208 ft) above sea level, the falls descend in the range of 180–210 metres (590–690 ft) into the Tully Gorge National Park, near the town of Ravenshoe. Access to the falls is via a 1.6-kilometre (0.99 mi) graded track.

Most of the water that would have otherwise flowed over the falls has been diverted to the Kareeya Hydro Power Station and dammed by Koombooloomba Dam. As a result, the falls flow only during a big wet season.

== See also ==
- List of waterfalls
- List of waterfalls in Australia
