= Midgenoo, Queensland =

Midgenoo
- Town
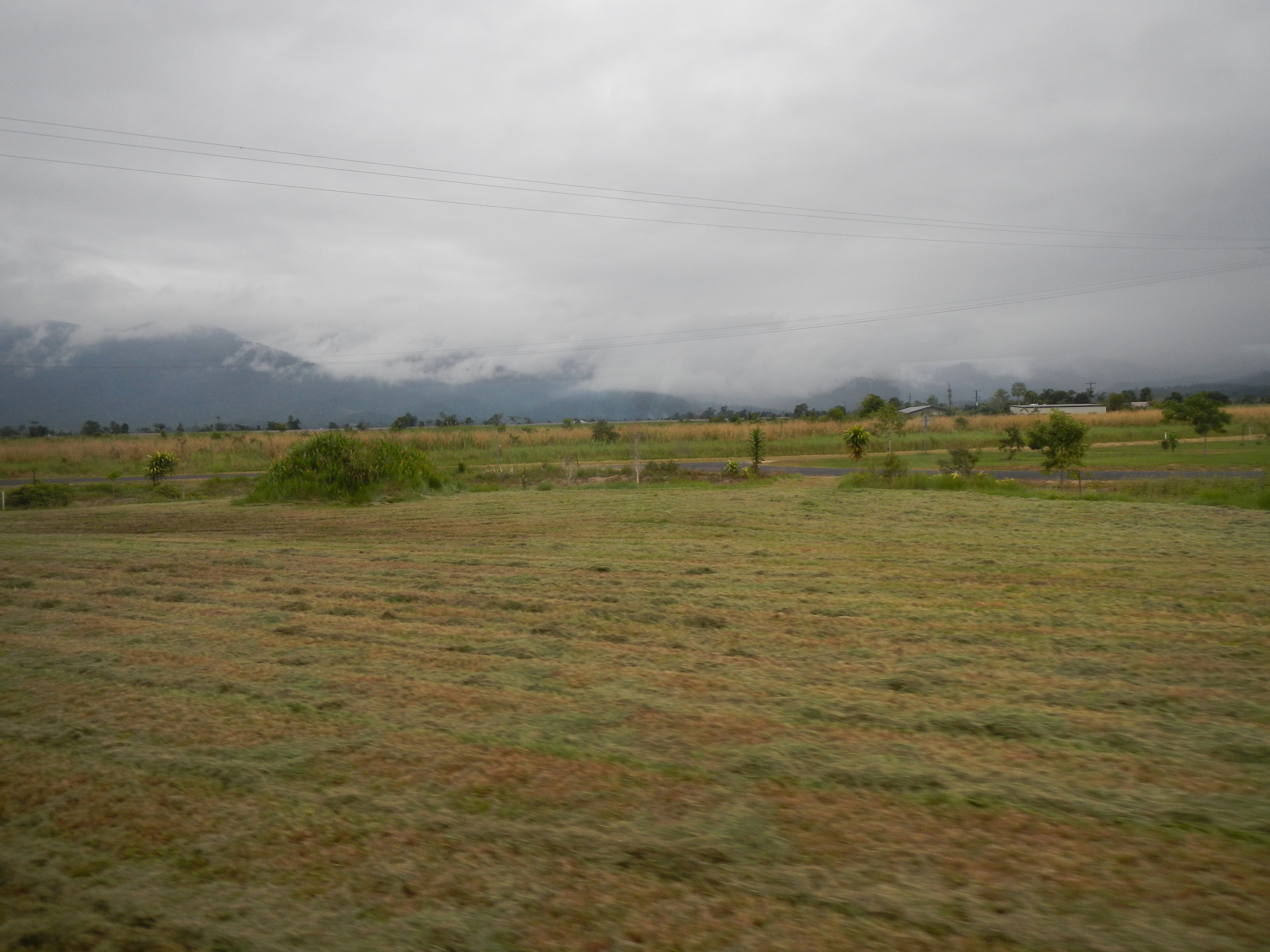
- View across the fields to distant mountains, Midgenoo, 2013

- Interactive map of Midgenoo
- Coordinates: 17.8947°S 145.9605°E
- Country: Australia
- State: Queensland
- LGA: Cassowary Coast Region
- Location: 6.9 km (4.3 mi) NE of Tully; 47.1 km (29.3 mi) SSW of Innisfail; 135 km (84 mi) S of Cairns; 213 km (132 mi) NNW of Townsville; 1,657 km (1,030 mi) NNW of Brisbane

Government
  - State electorate: Hill
  - Federal division: Kennedy

Area
  - Total: 7.5 km^{2} (2.9 sq mi)

Population
  - Total: 76 (2021 census)
  - Density: 10.13/km^{2} (26.2/sq mi)
- Time zone: UTC+10:00 (AEST)
- Postcode: 4854
Localities around Midgenoo
Feluga	Feluga	East Feluga
Bulgun	Midgenoo	East Feluga
Birkalla	Birkalla	Merryburn

Midgenoo is a rural town and locality in the Cassowary Coast Region, Queensland, Australia. In the 2021 census, the locality of Midgenoo had a population of 76 people.

== Geography ==
The town is north of centre within the locality. This land is flat (approx 20 metres above sea level) and is used for crops, principally sugarcane.

The Bruce Highway and North Coast railway line traverse the locality from south-west to north, passing through the town. Midgenoo railway station (17.8955°S 145.9611°E) once served the town but now is abandoned. There are also sugarcane tramways in the locality.

== History ==
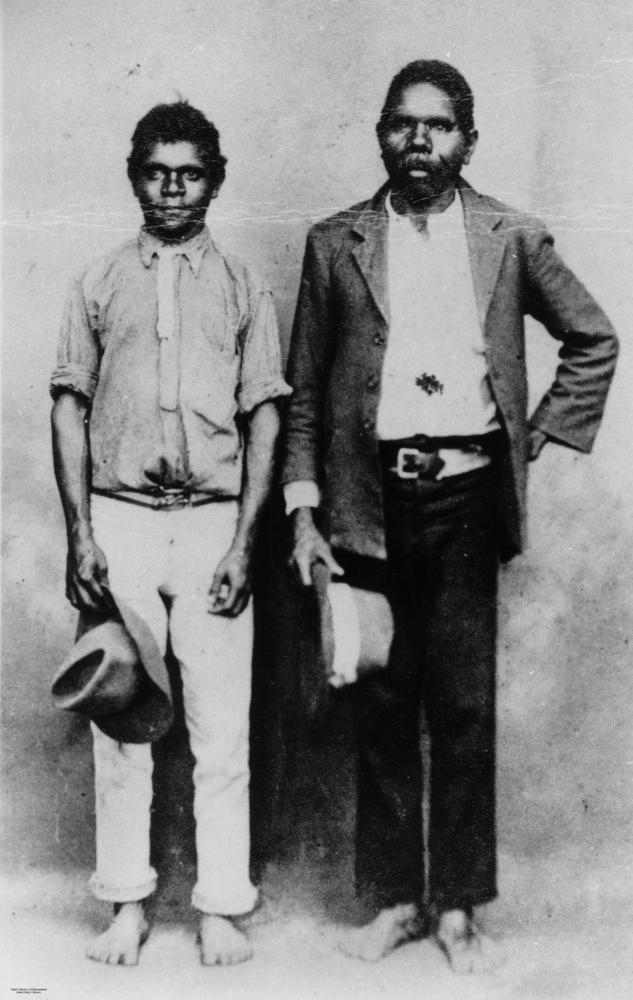
Aboriginal stockmen Digby Denham and Old Mango at Midgenoo, 1916

The town's name Midgenoo is taken from the Midgenoo railway station and is reportedly an Aboriginal word for a local tree.

Midgenoo State School opened in 1923 and closed in 1933.

== Demographics ==
In the 2016 census, the locality of Midgenoo had a population of 51 people.

In the 2021 census, the locality of Midgenoo had a population of 76 people.

== Education ==
There are no schools in Midgneoo. The nearest government primary school is Feluga State School in neighbouring Feluga to the north. The nearest government secondary school is Tully State High School in Tully to the south. There is also a Catholic primary school in Tully.
