= Big Dreamers =

- Directed by: Camille Hardman
- Written by: John Fink
- Produced by: Camille Hardman; John Fink
- Cinematography: Camille Hardman
- Edited by: Jane St Vincent Welch; Peter Barton
- Music by: Neill Duncan
- Distributed by: BarkingCat Productions
- Release date: January 2007 (Big Sky Documentary Film Festival)
- Running time: 55 minutes
- Country: Australia

Big Dreamers is a 55-minute documentary film showcasing the Big Things of Australia. Directed by Camille Hardman, and produced by Camille Hardman and John Fink, Big Dreamers features the construction of The Biggest Gumboot in the world in Tully, in far North Queensland.

== Plot ==
Tully was a prosperous town in tropical north Queensland, until Brazil dumped its sugar surplus on the global market. The locals call a meeting to save the town from financial disaster. Ron Hunt stands up and proposes to build The World's Biggest Gumboot in honour of Tully's rainfall record of 7.98 metres in 1950.

Ron declares the Big Golden Gumboot will put Tully on the map, so he and the local Rotary Club hire out-of-towner Bryan Newell to build the edifice. Tully's local artist and fellow Rotarian. Roger Chandler is not pleased. The cost of the boot blows out to $90,000, and the construction is endlessly delayed by rain.

Personalities clash, and Ron wonders whether he has made the right decision.

Dispersed throughout the main narrative are small vignettes highlighting other Big Things around Australia.

== Cast ==
- Ron Hunt – Rotarian
- Bryan Newell – Boot builder
- Roger Chandler – Local Artist
- Tip Byrne – Mayor of Tully
- Sera & Cerrino Qualiata – Cane Farmers
- Rotary Club of Tully
- Townsfolk of Tully
- Kevin Rubie – The Big Banana, Coffs Harbour, New South Wales
- Eric Peltz – The Big Lobster, Kingston SE, South Australia
- Fred Glasbrenner – The Big Abalone, Laverton North, Victoria
- Dianne & Roger Venning – The Big Galah, Kimba, South Australia
- Joyce Peterson – The Big Orange, Gayndah, Queensland
- Fran Myors – The Big Koala, Phillip Island, Victoria
- Jim Mauger – The Big Potato, Robertson, New South Wales

== Awards ==
Winner, 2007 Award of Excellence – Videography

== Film festivals ==
Big Dreamers featured in a number of Film Festivals worldwide Including:

- 2007 SILVERDOCS: AFI/Discovery Channel Documentary Festival, Washington, USA
- 2007 Hot Springs Documentary Film Festival, Arkansas, USA
- 2007 Melbourne International Film Festival, Victoria, Australia
- 2007 Revelation Perth International Film Festival, Perth, Australia
- 2007 Kansas International Film Festival, Kansas City, USA
- 2007 Palm Beach International Film Festival, Florida, USA
- 2007 deadCENTER Film Festival, Oklahoma, USA
- 2007 Byron Bay International Film Festival, NSW, Australia
- 2007 Big Sky Documentary Film Festival, Montana, USA
- 2007 Dungog Film Festival, Dungog, Australia
- 2008 Wisconsin Film Festival, Madison, USA
- 2008 Cork International Film Festival, Cork, Ireland
