= Bulgun, Queensland =

Bulgun
- Suburb
- Interactive map of Bulgun
- Coordinates: 17.8947°S 145.9294°E
- Country: Australia
- State: Queensland
- LGA: Cassowary Coast Region
- Location: 4.6 km (2.9 mi) N of Tully; 51.7 km (32.1 mi) SSW of Innisfail; 139 km (86 mi) S of Cairns; 212 km (132 mi) NNW of Townsville; 1,570 km (980 mi) NNW of Brisbane

Government
  - State electorate: Hill
  - Federal division: Kennedy

Area
  - Total: 7.0 km^{2} (2.7 sq mi)

Population
  - Total: 285 (2021 census)
  - Density: 40.7/km^{2} (105.4/sq mi)
- Time zone: UTC+10:00 (AEST)
- Postcode: 4854
Suburbs around Bulgun
Walter Hill	Walter Hill	Feluga
Walter Hill	Bulgun	Midgenoo
Walter Hill	Tully	Birkalla

Bulgun is a rural locality in the Cassowary Coast Region, Queensland, Australia. In the 2021 census, Bulgun had a population of 285 people.

== Demographics ==
In the 2016 census, Bulgun had a population of 276 people.

In the 2021 census, Bulgun had a population of 285 people.

== Education ==
There are no schools in Bulgun. The nearest government primary schools are Feluga State School in neighbouring Feluga to the north-west and Tully State School in neighbouring Tully to the south. The nearest government secondary school is Tully State High School, also in Tully.
