= Mount Mackay, Queensland =

Mount Mackay
- Suburb
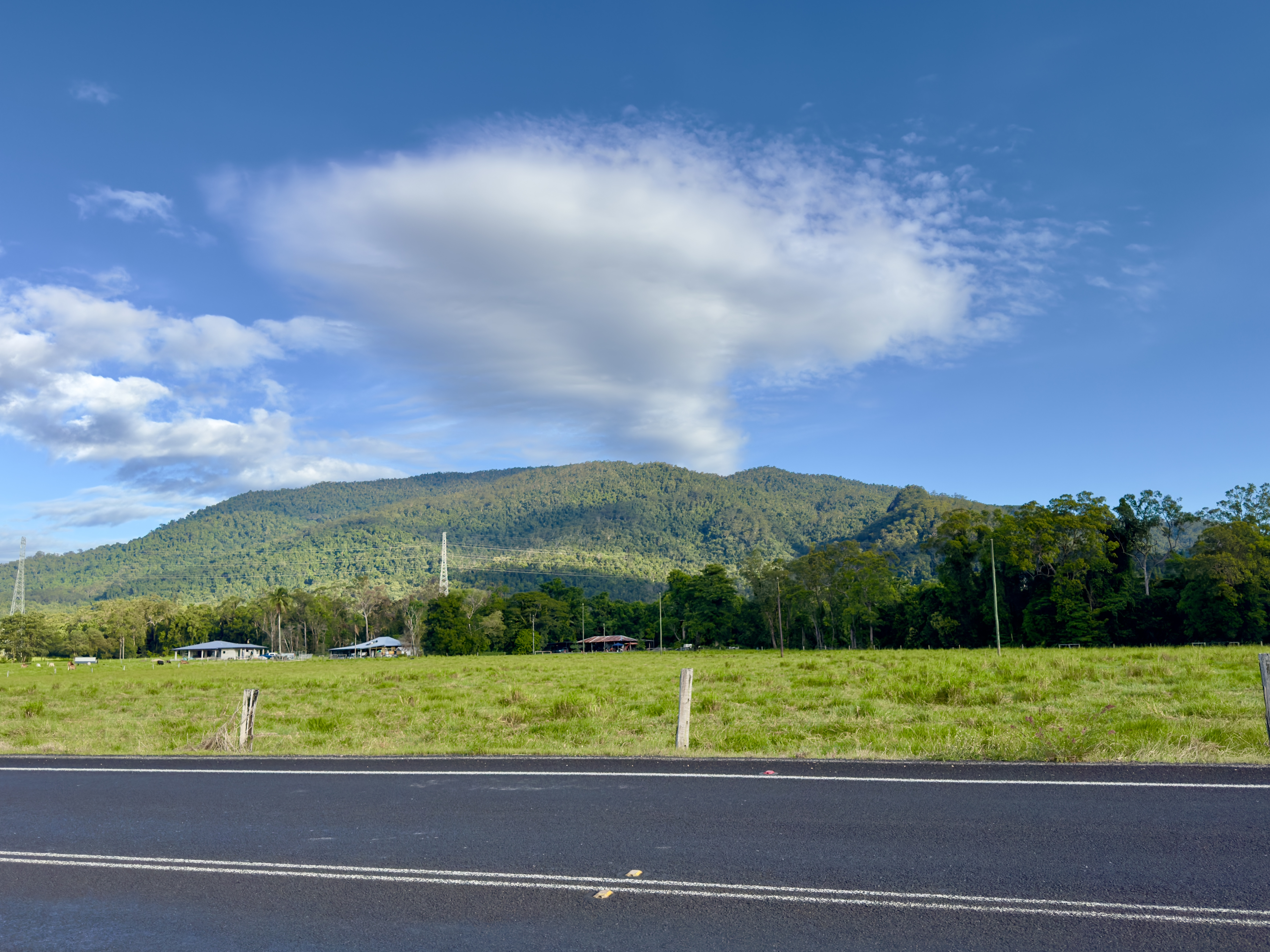
- View of Mount Mackay from Merryburn, 2025

- Interactive map of Mount Mackay
- Coordinates: 17.9372°S 145.9988°E
- Country: Australia
- State: Queensland
- LGA: Cassowary Coast Region
- Location: 13.8 km (8.6 mi) E of Tully; 59.5 km (37.0 mi) S of Innisfail; 147 km (91 mi) S of Cairns; 220 km (140 mi) NNW of Townsville; 1,582 km (983 mi) NNW of Brisbane

Government
  - State electorate: Hill
  - Federal division: Kennedy

Area
  - Total: 37.7 km^{2} (14.6 sq mi)

Population
  - Total: 0 (2021 census)
  - Density: 0.000/km^{2} (0.00/sq mi)
- Time zone: UTC+10:00 (AEST)
- Postcode: 4854
Suburbs around Mount Mackay
Birkalla; Merryburn	East Feluga	Granadilla
Tully	Mount Mackay	Tam O'Shanter
Silky Oak	Lower Tully	Carmoo

Mount Mackay is a locality in the Cassowary Coast Region, Queensland, Australia. In the 2021 census, Mount Mackay had "no people or a very low population".

== Geography ==
The Mount Mackay National Park fully occupies the locality. It forms part of the Wet Tropics of Queensland, a World Heritage Site.

The mountain Mount Mackay is at the south-west of the locality and stands at 724 metres (2,375 ft) above sea level. In the centre of the locality the elevation falls to 10 metres (33 ft) in the valley of Carmoo Creek, and then rises towards the Tam O'Shanter Range at the north-east of the locality, with two peaks on the boundary itself: Mount Tam O'Shanter 381 metres (1,250 ft) and Mount Douglas 339 metres (1,112 ft). The national park provides a safe habitat for the mahogany glider and the southern cassowary.

== History ==
The locality takes its name from the mountain. In 2005, the Mount Mackay National Park was created from the Mount Mackay State Forest.

== Demographics ==
In the 2016 census, Mount Mackay had "no people or a very low population".

In the 2021 census, Mount Mackay had "no people or a very low population".
