= Koombooloomba Hydro Power Station =

- Interactive map of Koombooloomba Hydro Power Station
- Country: Australia
- Location: Koombooloomba, Queensland
- Status: Operational
- Construction cost: A$10.6 million

Reservoir
- Creates: Koombooloomba Dam

Power Station
- Coordinates: 17°50′S 145°36′E
- Operator: CleanCo Queensland
- Commission date: 1999
- Type: Run-of-the-river
- Turbines: 1
- Installed capacity: 7.3 MW (9,800 hp)
- Annual generation: 22.5 GWh (81 TJ)
- Website www.stanwell.com/energy-assets/our-power-stations/hydro/

The Koombooloomba Hydro Power Station is a run-of-the-river small hydroelectric power station at Koombooloomba Dam, in Far North Queensland, Australia. Koombooloomba has one turbo generator, with a generating capacity of 7.3 megawatts (9,800 hp) of electricity. The power station is owned by CleanCo.

The power station was commissioned in 1999, capturing energy from existing water releases required for the operation of Kareeya Hydro Power Station.

== See also ==
- List of active power stations in Queensland
