= Walter Hill, Queensland =

Walter Hill
- Suburb
- Interactive map of Walter Hill
- Coordinates: 17.8316°S 145.8127°E
- Country: Australia
- State: Queensland
- LGA: Cassowary Coast Region
- Location: 17.9 km (11.1 mi) NW of Tully; 71.1 km (44.2 mi) SW of Innisfail; 159 km (99 mi) S of Cairns; 223 km (139 mi) NNW of Townsville; 1,579 km (981 mi) NNW of Brisbane

Government
  - State electorate: Hill
  - Federal division: Kennedy

Area
  - Total: 330.6 km^{2} (127.6 sq mi)

Population
  - Total: 0 (2021 census)
  - Density: 0.0000/km^{2} (0.000/sq mi)
- Time zone: UTC+10:00 (AEST)
- Postcode: 4854
Suburbs around Walter Hill
Koombooloomba	Gulngai	Gulngai
Cardstone; Dingo Pocket	Walter Hill	Maadi; Djarawong
Cardstone	Jarra Creek; Tully	Feluga; Bulgun

Walter Hill is a rural locality in the Cassowary Coast Region, Queensland, Australia. In the 2021 census, Walter Hill had "no people or a very low population".

== Geography ==
The locality has the following mountains (from north to south):

- Mount Coleridge (17.7677°S 145.8188°E) at 858 metres (2,815 ft) above sea level
- Mount Cullumbullum (17.7796°S 145.7363°E) 980 metres (3,220 ft)
- Mount Marquette (17.8158°S 145.8475°E) at 1,068 metres (3,504 ft) above sea level
- Mount Henry (17.8239°S 145.8294°E) 831 metres (2,726 ft)
- Mount Tyson (17.9233°S 145.9078°E) 674 metres (2,211 ft)

Bullyard Creek Falls are south-east of Mount Henry (17.83117°S 145.84072°E).

Most of the locality is within the Tully Gorge National Park, which is part of the world heritage-listed Wet Tropics of Queensland. Apart from this protected area, the remaining land use is managed resource protection (where natural resources can be harvested but only in a sustainable way).

== Demographics ==
In the 2016 census, Walter Hill had "no people or a very low population".

In the 2021 census, Walter Hill had "no people or a very low population".

== Education ==
There are no schools in Walter Hill. The nearest government primary school is Feluga State School in neighbouring Feluga to the south-east. The nearest government secondary school is Tully State High School in Tully to the south. There is also a Catholic primary school in Tully.
