= CleanCo Queensland =

Queensland government-owned electricity generation company

CleanCo Queensland is a corporation owned by the Queensland Government in Australia. CleanCo owns and operates a range of electricity generation assets in Queensland, including run-of-the-river and pumped-storage hydroelectricity, gas-fired power plants, grid-scale solar farms and wind farms. The Queensland Government has a long-term ambition to generate 50 per cent of the state’s electricity from renewable sources by 2030. CleanCo was established in 2018 to manage those facilities.

The two ministers responsible for CleanCo are the Treasurer of Queensland and the Minister for Energy and Clean Economy Jobs. The company was launched with an initial $250 million grant to develop 1,000 megawatts of renewable energy capacity.

== Assets ==
The Queensland Government established CleanCo through the transfer of renewable energy assets from CS Energy and Stanwell Corporation. It has a mandate to increase competition in the energy market and with the intent of supporting the government's renewable energy target.

The assets transferred from the two other government-owned corporations are:

- Swanbank Power Station
- Wivenhoe Power Station
- Kareeya Hydro Power Station
- Barron Gorge Hydroelectric Power Station
- Koombooloomba Hydro Power Station

CleanCo took control of these assets on 31 October 2019.

CleanCo is establishing the Swanbank Clean Energy Hub at the site of the former Swanbank Power Station. The hub features a 250 MW/500 MWh big battery, an onsite solar farm and green hydrogen production facilities.

== Management ==
Maia Schweizer was the inaugural CEO of CleanCo. Tom Metcalfe took over the role in July 2022.

== See also ==
- Energy in Queensland
- Renewable energy in Australia
