= William Alcock Tully =

Irish politician (1830–1905)

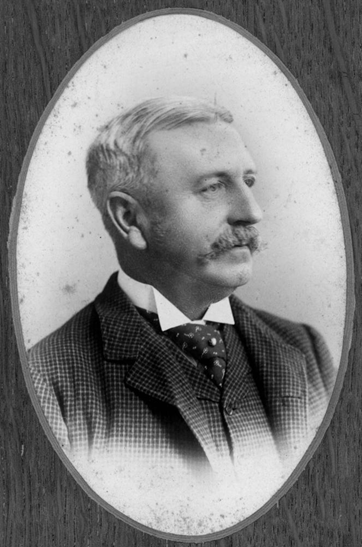
- William Alcock Tully in 1863
- Born: 14 March 1830; Dublin, Ireland
- Died: 26 April 1905 (aged 75) "Luciani", Bayswater Road, Sydney, Australia
- Occupation(s): Surveyor, Public servant
- Spouse(s): Louisa Lord (1833–1866) (married 16 August 1860); Sarah Anne Darvall (1846–1901) (married 27 May 1868 )
- Children: 7

William Alcock Tully (14 March 1830 – 26 April 1905) was a Surveyor General of Queensland, (then a colony, now a state of Australia).

== Early life ==
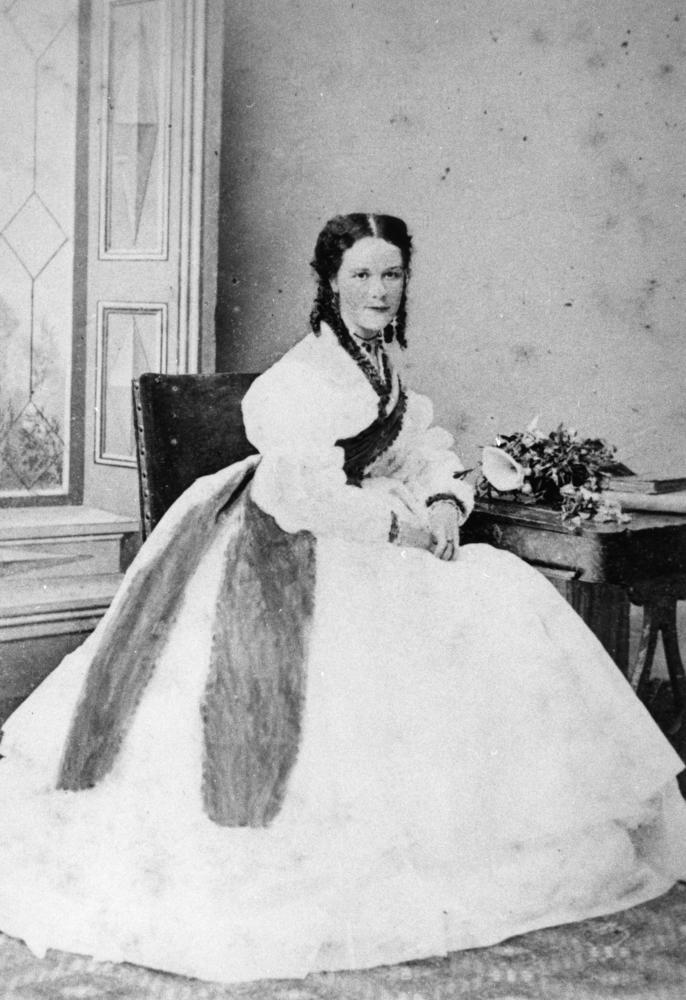
Tully's second wife Sarah Darvall c. 1868

Tully was born in Dublin, Ireland, the son of William Tully, a captain in the Royal Navy, and his wife Mary, née Alcock. He spent his youth in Charleville, County Cork (which he named the town of the same name in Queensland). He was educated at Trinity College, Dublin (B.A., 1852). Tully arrived in Hobart, Tasmania aboard the Lord Dalhousie on 14 August 1852.

== Career ==
On 1 May 1853, Tully became a road surveyor, and a third-class surveyor on 1 May 1854 until his resignation in July 1856. Then he was a contract surveyor until 31 December 1858 when he was appointed inspecting surveyor. Tully acted for a while as a gold commissioner and in 1859. He was a foundation member of the Tasmanian Club; in 1860 he married Louisa (died 26 February 1866), granddaughter of Simeon Lord, at Hobart.

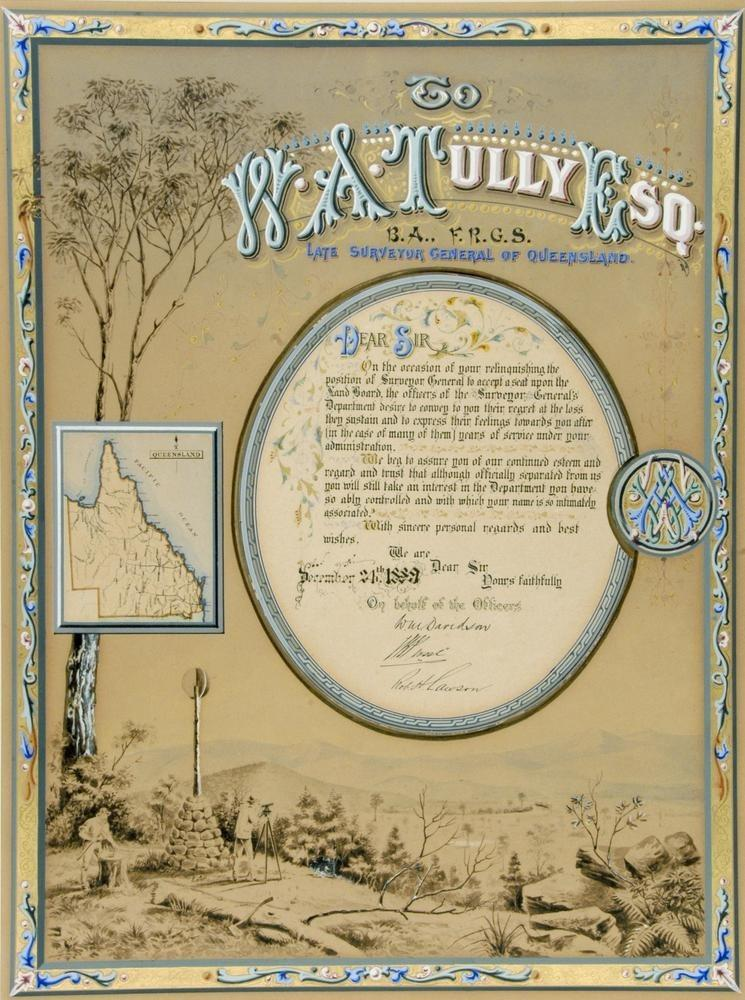
Illuminated address presented to William Tully on his retirement as Surveyor-General of Queensland, 24 December 1889

In October 1863 (with a glowing reference from James Erskine Calder, Surveyor General of Tasmania) Tully arrived in Queensland as a commissioner of Crown lands in the Kennedy and Warrego pastoral districts during which he surveyed the site of the town of Charleville, Queensland (which he named for Charleville, County Cork where he had spent his youth). On 16 August 1866 Tully became under-secretary for public lands and chief commissioner of crown lands. Soon afterward he clashed with Sir Augustus Charles Gregory, the Surveyor General of Queensland. On 12 March 1875, Tully became acting Surveyor General replacing Gregory. In 1880 on Tully's advice, the offices of Surveyor General and under-secretary for lands were divided; on 9 July Tully was made Surveyor General and Edward Deshon became under-secretary for lands.

Tully had assisted to draft the Lands Alienation Act (1868) and the Consolidating Crown Lands Alienation Act (1876); as Surveyor General, he supervised an expansion of activities, endeavored to improve standards and enhanced reproduction of Survey Office maps. Tully was appointed to the Land Board on 4 December 1889 and retired on 31 December 1900.

== Late life and legacy ==
Tully had a significant influence on the land laws, procedures and practices of Queensland. The town of Tully in Queensland and the Tully River in northern Queensland were named after him.
