= Kareeya Hydro Power Station =

Hydroelectric power station in Queensland, Australia

- Interactive map of Kareeya Hydro Power Station
- Country: Australia
- Location: Far North Queensland

Reservoir
- Creates: Koombooloomba Dam

Power Station
- Coordinates: 17°46′02″S 145°34′41″E
- Operator: CleanCo Queensland
- Commission date: 1957
- Type: Run-of-the-river
- Turbines: 4
- Installed capacity: 88 MW (118,000 hp)
- Annual generation: 22.5 GWh (81 TJ)
- Website www.stanwell.com/energy-assets/our-power-stations/hydro/

The Kareeya Hydro Power Station is an underground run-of-the-river hydroelectric power station, located in Cardstone near Tully in Far North Queensland, Australia. The power station began generating electricity in 1957 and has capacity of 88 megawatts (118,000 hp), that is fed into the National Electricity Market. The power station is owned by CleanCo Queensland.

== Overview ==
Taking its name from the Aboriginal word meaning 'big water', the Kareeya Hydro project originally comprised construction of Koombooloomba Dam, the Tully Falls Weir, and the power station. A dam was needed for water storage because most of the rain in the area falls in the first few months of the year. An intake tower is located in the weir, which directs water down a tunnel to the turbines in an underground power station below Tully Falls.

Planning for the project began in 1949 and it was intended to be operating by 1955. Construction of a diversion tunnel started in early 1952. The 132 Kv transmission line was the first constructed in Queensland and the state's first use of steel towers for electricity distribution. The last of the four generating sets was installed by mid-1959.

The power station's staff and families were provided accommodation in a small village, named Cardstone, located downstream from the plant.

In 1988, the Queensland Government approved plans to automate the power station. The benefits were the reduced need for on-site staff, which in turn minimised the problems with staff accessing the power station during the wet season when roads became impassable.

The power station was upgraded between 2005 and 2008 that extended its life by 25 years and increased its capacity, generation, efficiency, and availability.

== See also ==
- List of active power stations in Queensland
