= Feluga, Queensland =

Feluga
- Suburb
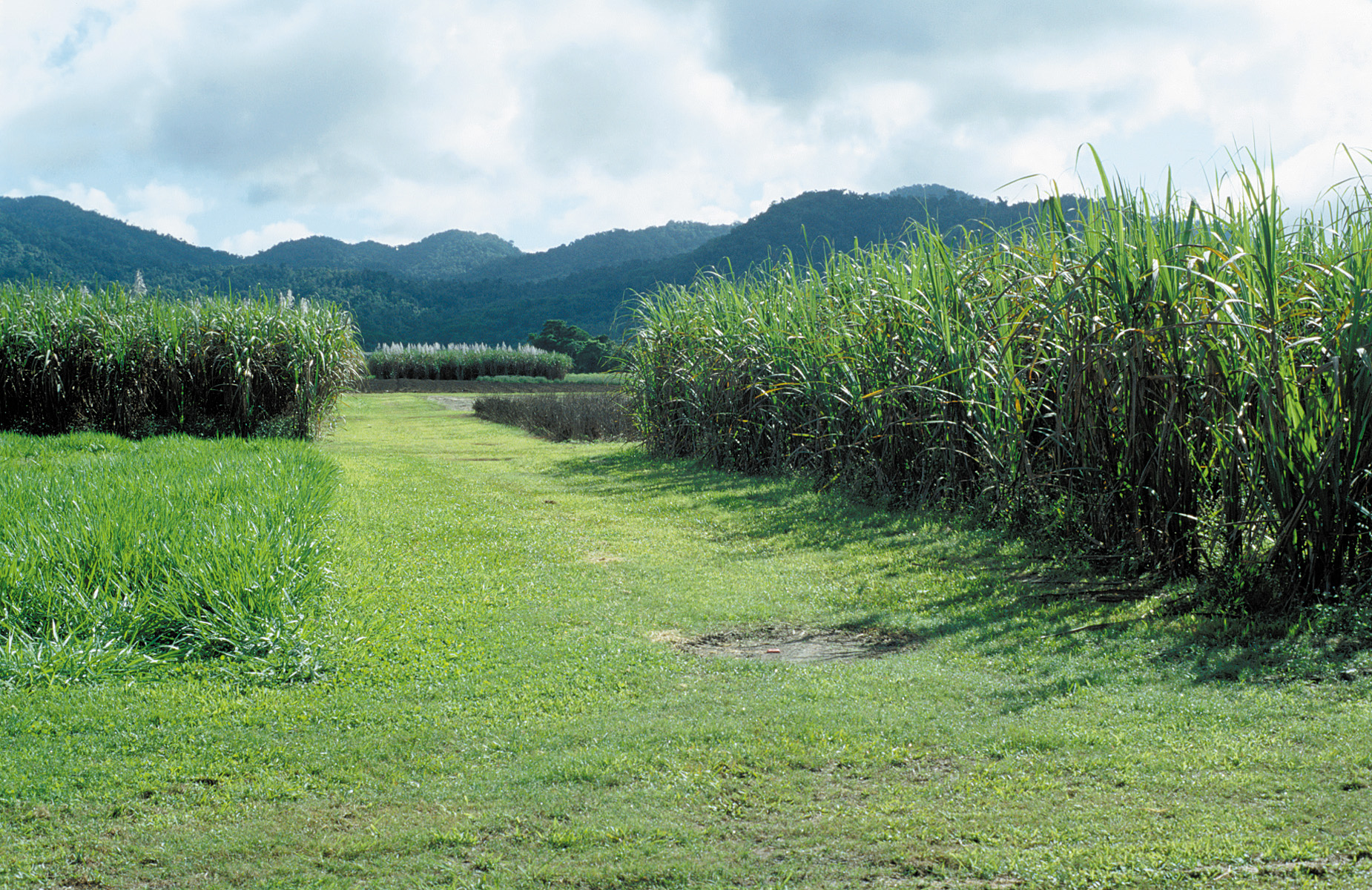
- Sugarcane plantations in Feluga, 2007

- Interactive map of Feluga
- Coordinates: 17.8766°S 145.9558°E
- Country: Australia
- State: Queensland
- LGA: Cassowary Coast Region
- Location: 8.4 km (5.2 mi) NNE of Tully; 46.3 km (28.8 mi) S of Innisfail; 134 km (83 mi) S of Cairns; 1,550 km (960 mi) NNW of Brisbane

Government
  - State electorate: Hill
  - Federal division: Kennedy

Area
  - Total: 6.0 km^{2} (2.3 sq mi)
- Elevation: 30–90 m (98–295 ft)

Population
  - Total: 306 (2021 census)
  - Density: 51.0/km^{2} (132.1/sq mi)
- Time zone: UTC+10:00 (AEST)
- Postcode: 4854
Suburbs around Feluga
Walter Hill	Walter Hill	Djarawong
Bulgun	Feluga	East Feluga
Midgenoo	Midgenoo	Midgenoo

Feluga is a rural locality in the Cassowary Coast Region, Queensland, Australia. In the 2021 census, Feluga had a population of 306 people.

== Geography ==
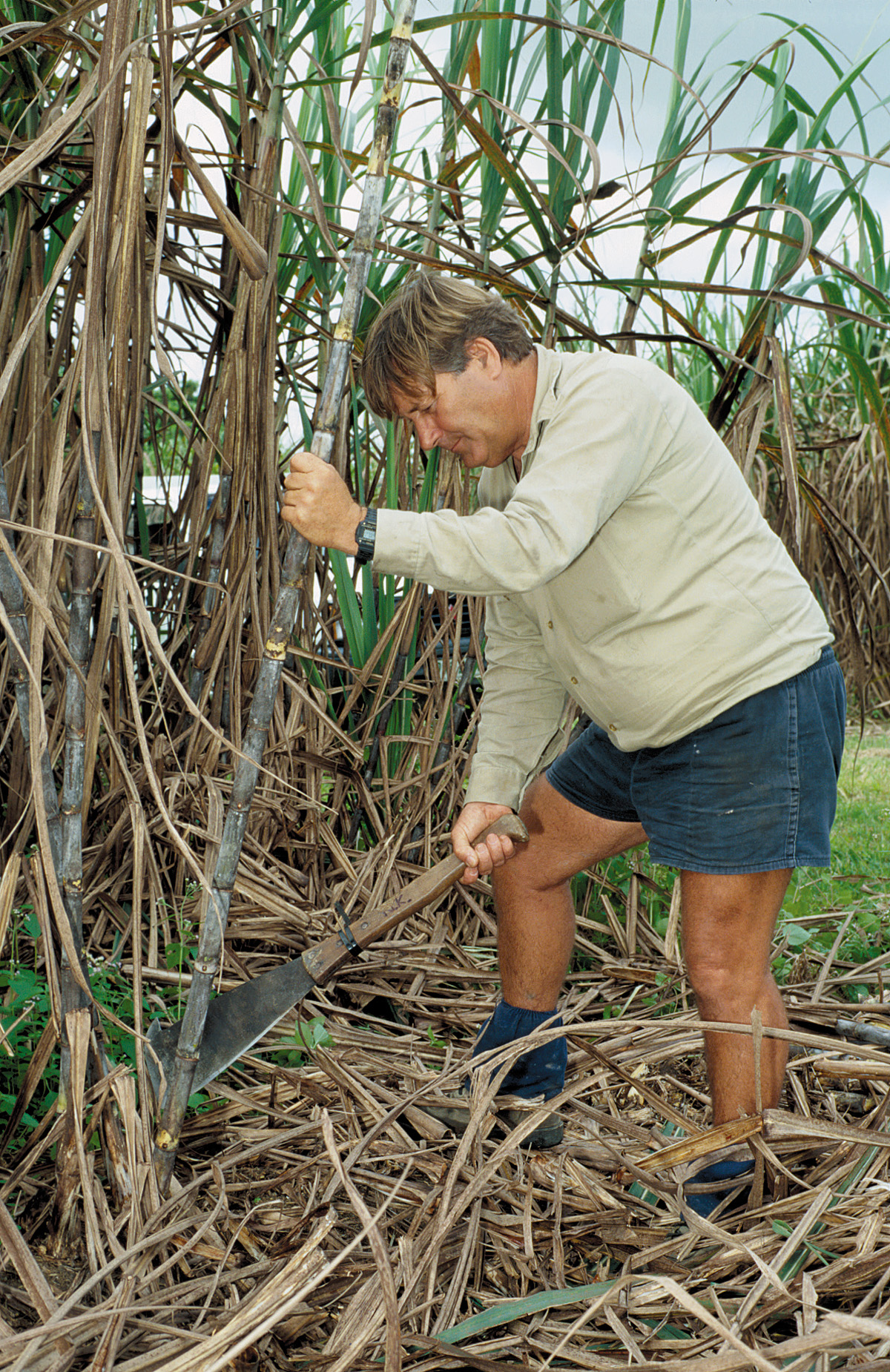
Cutting sugarcane, Feluga, 2007

Feluga is in a valley with a high rainfall. The land is mostly flat, 30 to 40 metres (98 to 131 ft) above sea level, but rises to 90 metres (300 ft) towards the north-west boundary with neighbouring locality Walter Hill which is mountainous terrain.

The predominant land use is growing sugarcane.

The Bruce Highway is the eastern boundary of the locality. The North Coast railway line runs parallel and immediately west of the highway but there are no railway stations serving the locality. There is a network of cane tramways to deliver the harvested sugarcane to the sugar mill in Tully.

== History ==
The locality was established as a railway station as the North Coast railway line was being built in the 1920s. It was named by the Queensland Railways Department on 25 November 1921, although rails were not actually laid to the station location until late 1922. The name is believed to be corrupted version of a Palestinian place name El Faluje, a town which was occupied by Australian Light Horse troops (4th Brigade) on 10 November 1917. By October 1923 the railway station itself and a stationmaster's residence were still under construction with the surrounding area consisting of thick undeveloped scrub, but despite this a train from Innisfail visited Feluga as part of celebrations of the Innisfail Jubilee with passengers admiring the tropical scenery. In December 1923 the railway line up to Feluga was officially opened. Feluga railway station is now an abandoned railway station (17.8814°S 145.9705°E).

Domenico Borgna settled in Feluga and established a sugar cane farm in 1923, prior to the establishment of the Tully mill, making him one of the earliest cane farmers in the region. By January 1924 there was significant passenger traffic between Feluga and Innisfail. As of June 1924 Feluga was the official terminus for mail being delivered on the North Coast Line although that month a request, which was approved, was submitted for mail to be delivered further north to settlers in the Banyan district by construction trains. In July a report noted Feluga was likely to become a township due to being surrounded by promising farms which were likely to use Feluga as their principal railway station and a sawmill being established in its vicinity, and late that month a signpost with the name was raised for the first time and the first sugar cane harvest for the Banyan took place and was processed through Feluga.

In mid-1923 an honorary Queensland Ambulance Transport Brigade centre was established at Feluga.

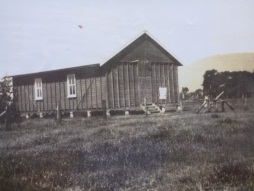
Feluga Public Hall

Feluga Hall opened circa June 1926 with a sports day and fancy dress ball held to celebrate the occasion.

The foundation stone of St Rita's Catholic Church was laid in May 1935 by Bishop John Heavey. He returned on Sunday 7 July 1935 to officially open the church. The church was at 140 Feluga Road (17.8814°S 145.9683°E) on land donated by William Tynan. It has now closed and been converted into 3 residences.

Feluga Provisional School opened on 7 February 1927 with 25 students in the Feluga Hall. Circa 1934, it became Feluga State School on a new site about 300 metres (980 ft) down the road from the hall.

Fegula Hall was destroyed in 1956 by Cyclone Agnes.

== Demographics ==
In the 2016 census, Feluga had a population of 251 people.

In the 2021 census, Feluga had a population of 306 people.

== Education ==
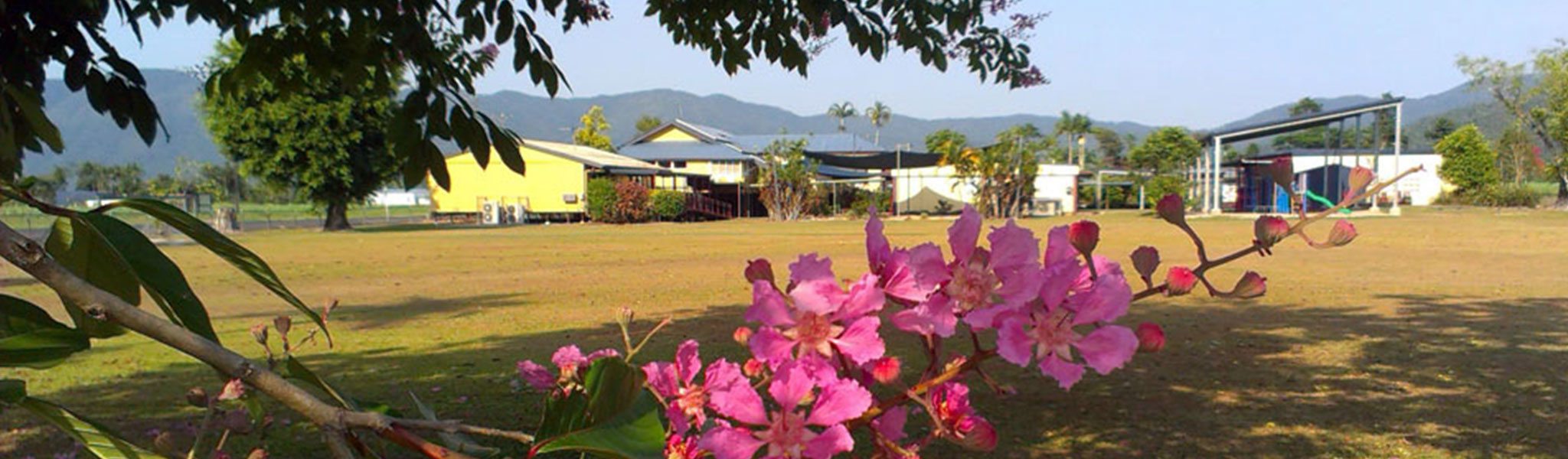
Feluga State School, 2023

Feluga State School is a government primary (Prep–6) school for boys and girls at Feluga Road (17.8807°S 145.9652°E). In 2016, the school had an enrolment of 32 students with 3 teachers (2 full-time equivalent) and 6 non-teaching staff (3 full-time equivalent). In 2018, the school had an enrolment of 43 students with 2 teachers (1 full-time equivalent) and 6 non-teaching staff (3 full-time equivalent).

There are no secondary schools in Feluga. The nearest government secondary school is Tully State High School in Tully to the south.

== Heritage listings ==
- former Feluga Catholic Church, 140 Feluga Road

== Amenities ==
There is a park at Bulgun Road (17.8802°S 145.9516°E) provided by the Cassowary Coast Regional Council.
