= Tully Gorge National Park =

National park in Queensland, Australia

- IUCN category II (national park)
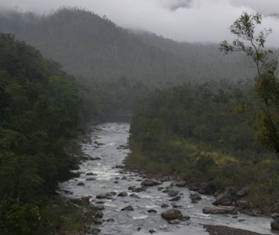

- Location within Queensland
- Location: Queensland
- Coordinates: 17.8125°S 145.72083°E
- Area: 543 km^{2} (210 sq mi)
- Established: 1923
- Governing body: Queensland Parks and Wildlife Service
- Website: https://parks.qld.gov.au/parks/tully-gorge

Tully Gorge is a national park in Far North Queensland, Australia, 1,338 km northwest of Brisbane. The park forms part of the Wooroonooran Important Bird Area, identified as such by BirdLife International because it supports populations of a range of bird species endemic to Queensland's Wet Tropics.

== Waterfalls ==
Follow Tully Falls Road to the Tully Gorge Lookout. Tully Falls only run in the wet season, but the walls of rock and rainforest which plunge 300 m (984 feet) down to the Tully River are still an awe-inspiring sight. An 800 m track takes walkers to the Tully River above the falls. Tully Falls Road begins on the outskirts of Ravenshoe at the junction of the Mount Garnet Road. The Tully Gorge National Park turnoff is 24 km down the road. A 1 km gravel road leads to a carpark and viewing platform.

== See also ==
- Protected areas of Queensland
