= Japoon National Park =

National park in Australia

- IUCN category II (national park)
- Location within Queensland
- Location: Queensland
- Coordinates: 17°44′23″S 145°53′14″E
- Area: 450 km^{2} (170 sq mi)
- Established: 1992
- Governing body: Queensland Parks and Wildlife Service

Japoon is a national park in Queensland, Australia, 1,306 km northwest of Brisbane. The park forms part of the Wooroonooran Important Bird Area, identified as such by BirdLife International because it supports populations of a range of bird species endemic to Queensland's Wet Tropics.

== See also ==
- Protected areas of Queensland
