= Tully, Queensland =

Tully
- Town
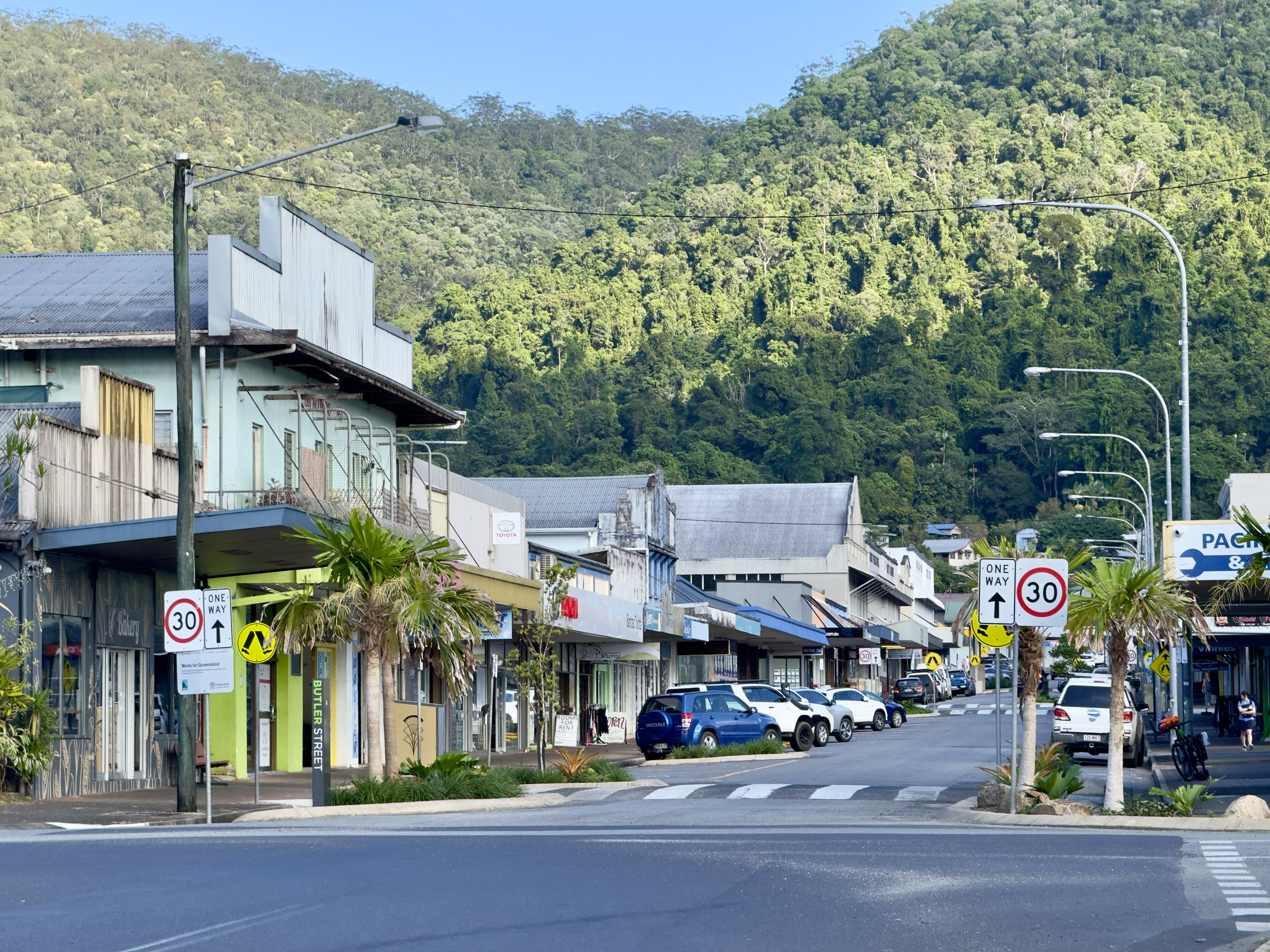
- Tully's main street, Butler Street, 2025

- Interactive map of Tully
- Coordinates: 17.9311°S 145.9242°E
- Country: Australia
- State: Queensland
- LGA: Cassowary Coast Region
- Location: 141 km (88 mi) S of Cairns; 208 km (129 mi) NNW of Townsville; 1,565 km (972 mi) NNW of Brisbane

Government
  - State electorates: Hill; Hinchinbrook
  - Federal division: Kennedy
- Elevation: 24 m (79 ft)

Population
  - Total: 2,368 (2021 census)
- Postcode: 4854
- Mean max temp: 33 °C (91 °F)
- Mean min temp: 22 °C (72 °F)
- Annual rainfall: 4,095.1 mm (161.22 in)
Localities around Tully
Walter Hill	Bulgun	Birkalla
Walter Hill	Tully	Mount Mackay
Jarra Creek	Jarra Creek	Silky Oak

Tully is a rural town and locality in the Cassowary Coast Region, Queensland, Australia. It is adjacent to the Bruce Highway, approximately 140 kilometres (87 mi) south of Cairns by road and 210 kilometres (130 mi) north of Townsville. Tully is perhaps best known for being one of the wettest towns in Australia, and home to the 7.9 m (25 ft 11 in) tall Golden Gumboot.

The Tully River, previously known as the Mackay River, was named after Surveyor-General William Alcock Tully in the 1870s. The town of Tully was named after the river when it was surveyed during the erection of the sugar mill in 1924, although the river does not flow through the town or the locality. During the previous decade, a settlement known as Banyan had grown up on the other side of Banyan Creek.

Tully is one of the larger towns of the Cassowary Coast Region. The economic base of the region is agriculture: sugar cane and bananas are the dominant crops. The sugar cane grown at the many farms in the district is processed locally at the Tully Sugar Mill, and the raw sugar produced is shipped elsewhere for further refining.

In the 2021 census, the locality of Tully had a population of 2,368 people.

== Geography ==
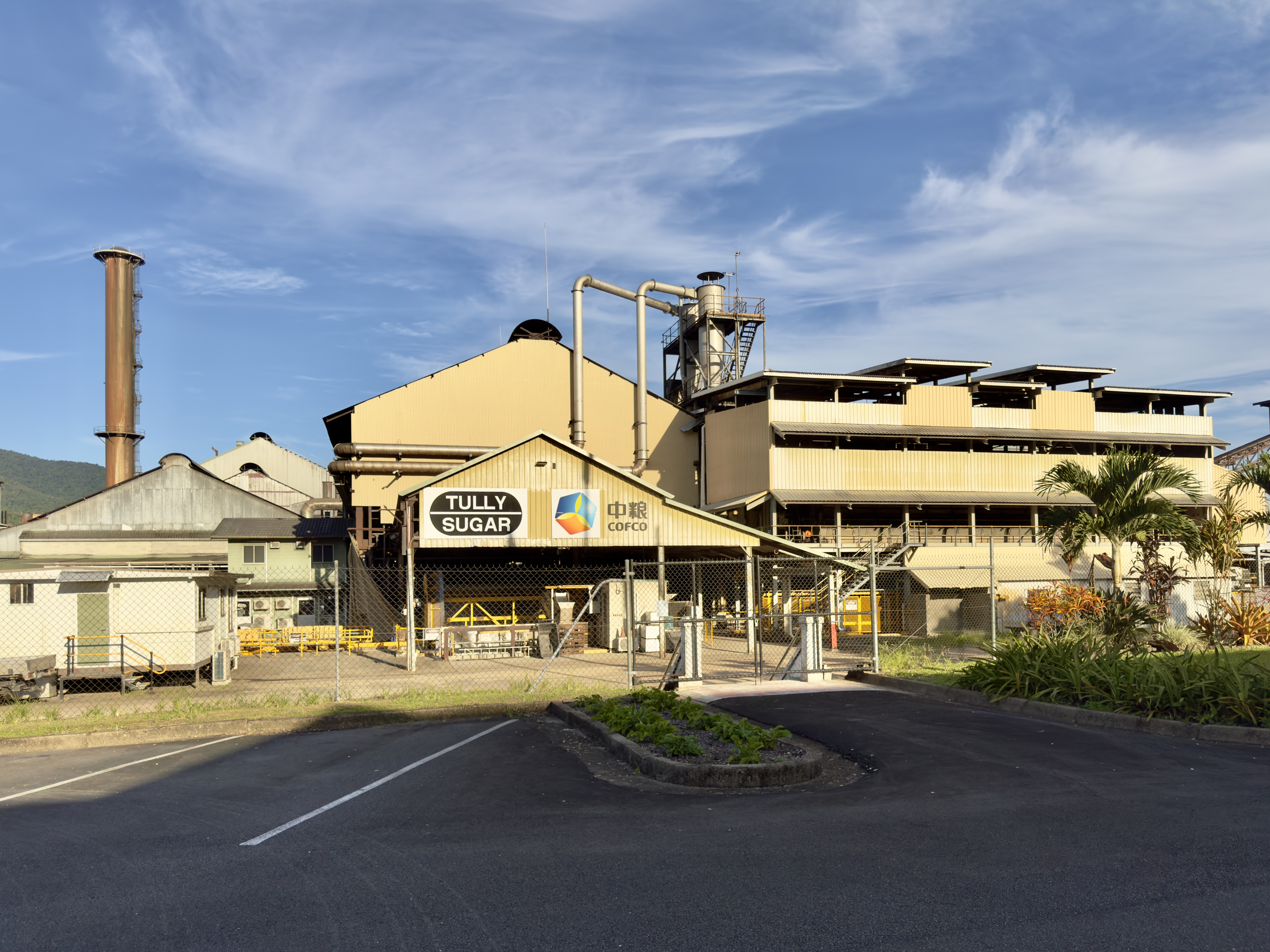
Tully Sugar Mill, 2025

The North Coast railway line enters the locality from the south-east (Silky Oak), passes through the town, and exits to the north-east (Birkalla). Tully railway station serves the town (17.9324°S 145.9328°E).

The Bruce Highway runs immediately parallel and east to the railway line from Silky Oak, through the town, to Birkalla.

The land use in the locality is predominantly residential housing and associated services in and around the town. Outside the town, the land use is predominantly crop growing (mostly sugarcane) with some grazing on native vegetation. There is a network of cane tramways to transport the harvested sugarcane to the Tully sugar mill.

== History ==
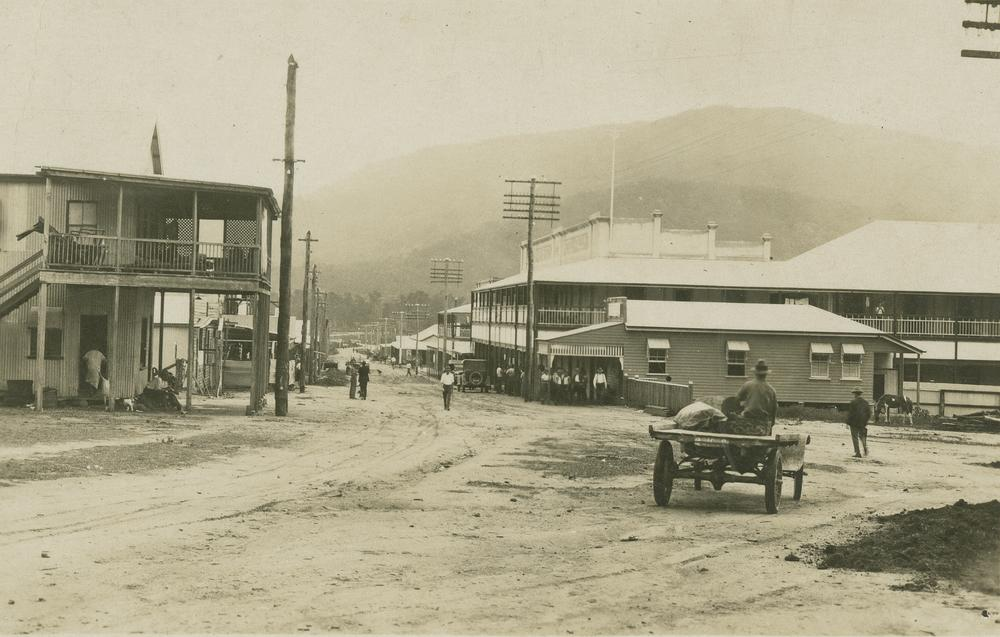
The township of Tully in 1927

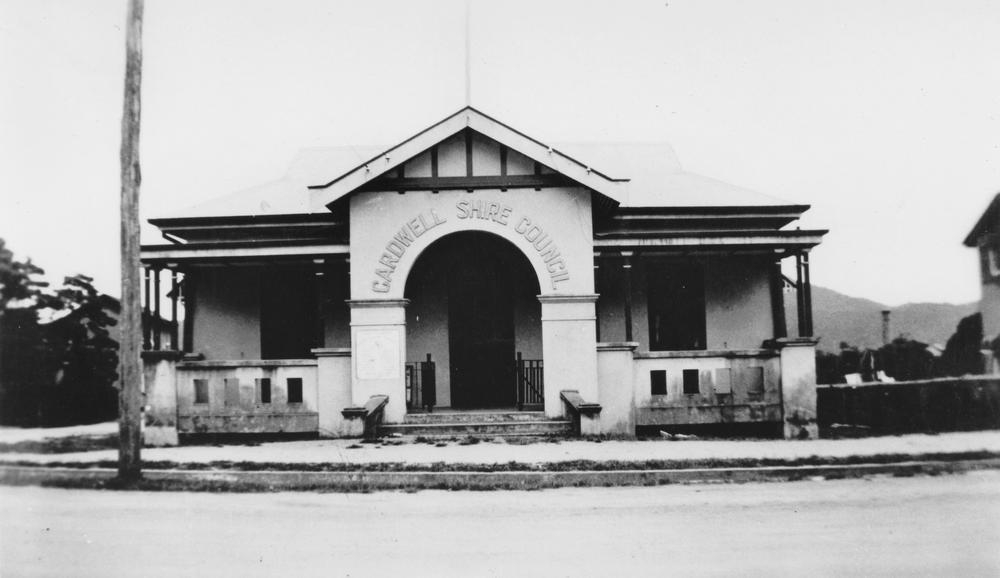
Cardwell Shire Council Chambers in Tully, 1930

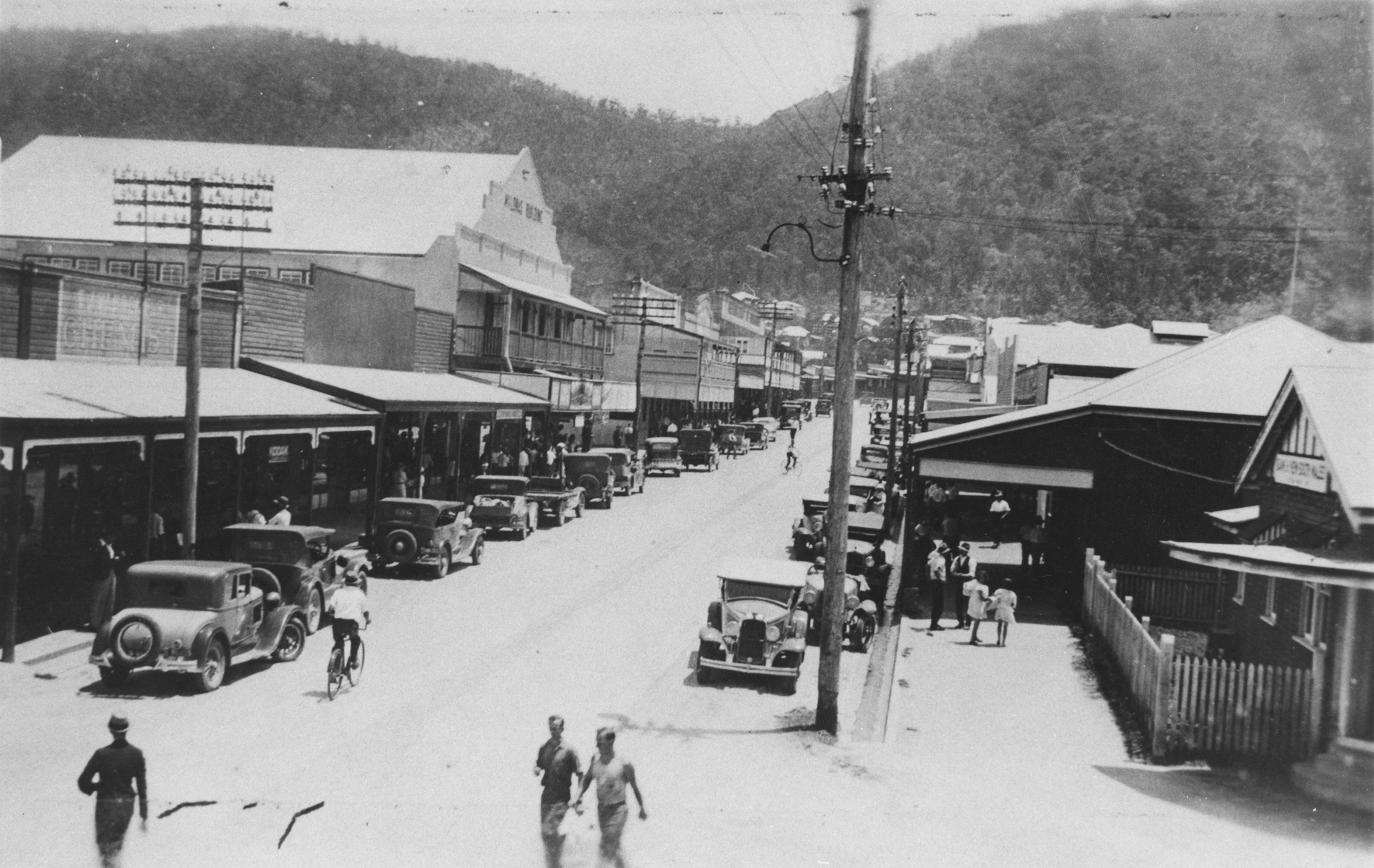
Butler Street, looking west, 1935

Dyirbal (also known as Djirbal) is a language of Far North Queensland, particularly the area around Tully and Tully River Catchment extending to the Atherton Tablelands. The Dyirbal language region includes the landscape within the local government boundaries of Cassowary Coast Regional Council and Tablelands Regional Council.

The Tully River area was slowly settled once Cardwell, to the south, was established. The river was renamed in 1872 in honour of William Alcock Tully, then under-secretary for public lands and chief commissioner of crown lands in Queensland and later Surveyor General of Queensland. The first settlers were the nephews of James Tyson, who raised beef cattle. It was not until the government constructed a sugar mill in 1925 that the town began to develop.

Banyan Provisional School opened on 30 June 1924. In 1925, it became Tully State School. When erected in 1924, it was known as Banyan Provisional and has since gone through a number of name changes: Tully Provisional (1925); Tully State School (1926); Tully State Rural School (1934); Tully State Rural and High School (1951); and reverted to Tully State School in 1964.

Augustinian priests based in Innisfail began to conduct Roman Catholic services in Tully in 1926. Vicar Apostolic of Cooktown John Heavey laid the foundation stone for a church dedicated to St Clare of Montefalco in May 1926. St Clare's Catholic School was established in 1928 by the Sisters of the Good Samaritan. A separate Tully Parish of the Roman Catholic Vicariate Apostolic of Cooktown, now the Roman Catholic Diocese of Cairns, was established in 1935.

Tully was originally within the Cardwell Division, which became the Shire of Cardwell in 1903. The first headquarters for the division/shire were in older town of Cardwell. In 1929, the decision was taken to relocate the shire council's headquarters to the newer but more populous town of Tully. The first council meeting held in Tully was in June 1929. A new shire chambers was built in 1930 on the south-east corner of Bryant and Morris Streets.

In December 1924, Tully was connected to both Townsville and Innisfail by the North Coast railway line.

Tully State High School opened on 28 January 1964. During Cyclone Yasi in 2011, B Block was completely destroyed and G Block was damaged. Both have since been rebuilt.

Tully remained the administrative centre for the Shire of Cardwell, until the shire was amalgamated into the Cassowary Coast Region in 2008. The regional council has its headquarters in Innisfail.

In 2019, Tully became the inaugural winner of a Loud Shirt Day competition to find Queensland's Loudest Town. Inspired by a local story, and facing strong competition from other regional Queensland towns, members of the community rallied together to raise $13,410 to support services provided to young people with hearing loss.

== Demographics ==
In the 2011 census, the locality of Tully had a population of 2,436 people.

In the 2016 census, the locality of Tully had a population of 2,390 people.

In the 2021 census, the locality of Tully had a population of 2,368 people.

== Heritage listings ==
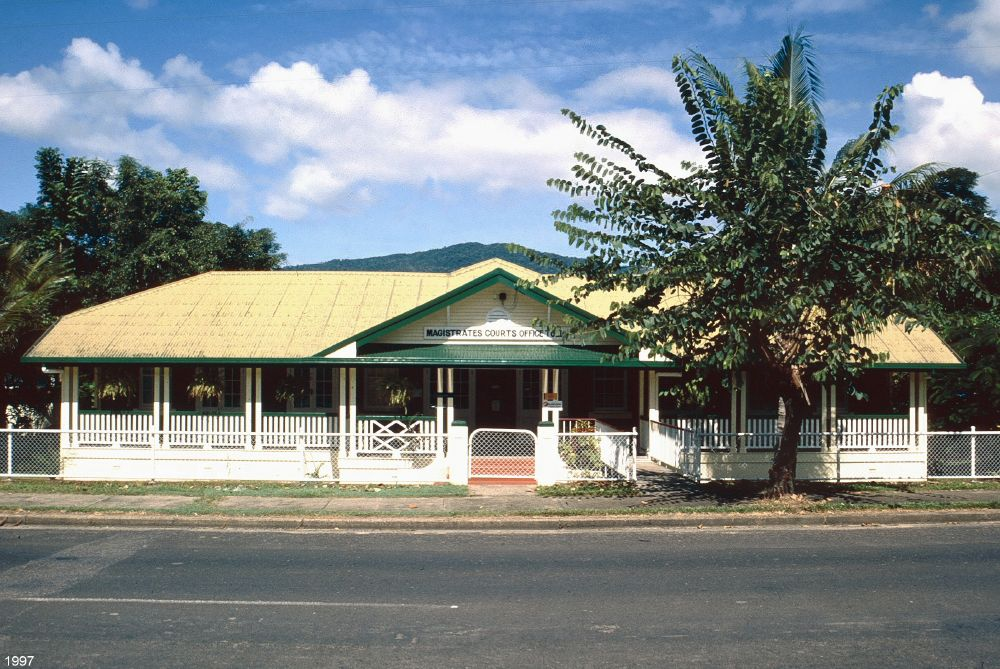
Tully Court House, 2015

Tully has a number of heritage-listed sites, including:

- Tully Court House, 69 Bryant Street (17.9364°S 145.9231°E)
- Tully State School, 17 Mars Street (17.9388°S 145.9213°E)

== Climate ==
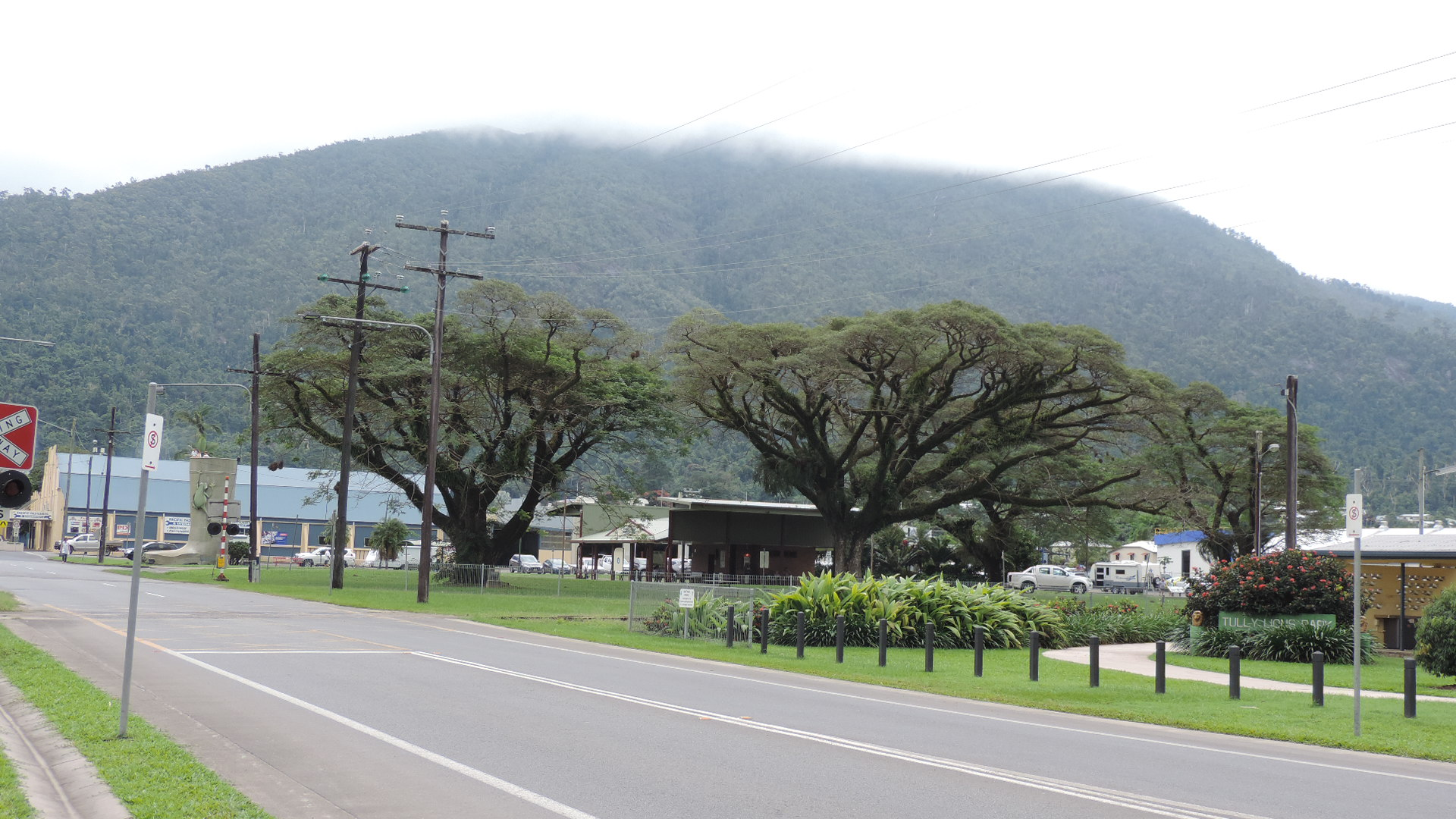
Butler Street, Tully, with Mount Tyson in the background with low cloud, 2016

Tully has a tropical rainforest climate (Köppen climate classification Af). This is due to its strong exposure to the southeasterly trade winds. With an average annual rainfall exceeding 4,000 millimetres (160 in), and the highest-ever annual rainfall in a populated area of Australia (7,900 millimetres (310 in) in 1950), Tully is arguably the wettest town in Australia. A rivalry exists between Tully and the nearby town of Babinda for that title.

Although Tully's average rainfall is less than that of Babinda, a giant gumboot, the "Golden Gumboot", was erected in Tully in 2003, as a monument to the town's high rainfall. It also serves as a museum, documenting past floods, as well as displaying the rainfall for the current year.

Climate data for Tully Sugar Mill, Queensland
Month	Jan	Feb	Mar	Apr	May	Jun	Jul	Aug	Sep	Oct	Nov	Dec	Year
Mean daily maximum °C (°F)	31.3 (88.3)	30.8 (87.4)	29.9 (85.8)	28.3 (82.9)	26.3 (79.3)	24.5 (76.1)	24.0 (75.2)	25.3 (77.5)	27.3 (81.1)	29.1 (84.4)	30.5 (86.9)	31.3 (88.3)	28.2 (82.8)
Mean daily minimum °C (°F)	22.7 (72.9)	22.8 (73.0)	22.1 (71.8)	20.7 (69.3)	18.6 (65.5)	16.1 (61.0)	15.1 (59.2)	15.6 (60.1)	16.9 (62.4)	19.0 (66.2)	20.8 (69.4)	22.1 (71.8)	19.4 (66.9)
Average rainfall mm (inches)	605.7 (23.85)	738.0 (29.06)	752.6 (29.63)	533.7 (21.01)	329.9 (12.99)	195.6 (7.70)	152.0 (5.98)	125.6 (4.94)	114.2 (4.50)	109.7 (4.32)	176.8 (6.96)	270.1 (10.63)	4,103.9 (161.57)
Source: BOM (Bureau of Meteorology)

=== Cyclone Yasi ===
Buildings in Tully were badly damaged by Cyclone Yasi on 3 February 2011. According to residents, Tully was "...a scene of mass devastation". An unknown number of homes were completely destroyed as intense winds, estimated at 300 km/h (190 mph), battered the area. Many other homes not destroyed sustained severe façade and or roof damage. As daybreak came, reports from the town stated that about 90 percent of the structures along the main avenue sustained extensive damage.

== Agriculture ==
In March 2015, a farm at Tully tested positive for the soil-borne Panama disease. Follow-up testing confirmed the results. One of the strains of the disease affects all types of bananas and has previously only been detected in the Northern Territory. Harvesting continued on the property with strict protocols allowing the farm to continue to operate and distribute product without posing a threat.

Outside experts were brought in to review Biosecurity Queensland's performance 15 February to 24 May 2021. Their assessment credits BQ with quick and effective response which is being emulated by other countries. Thus far TR4 continues to be contained to the Tully Valley only and containment is thought to be possible as long as accidental human movement and transport in flowing water can be halted.

== Education ==
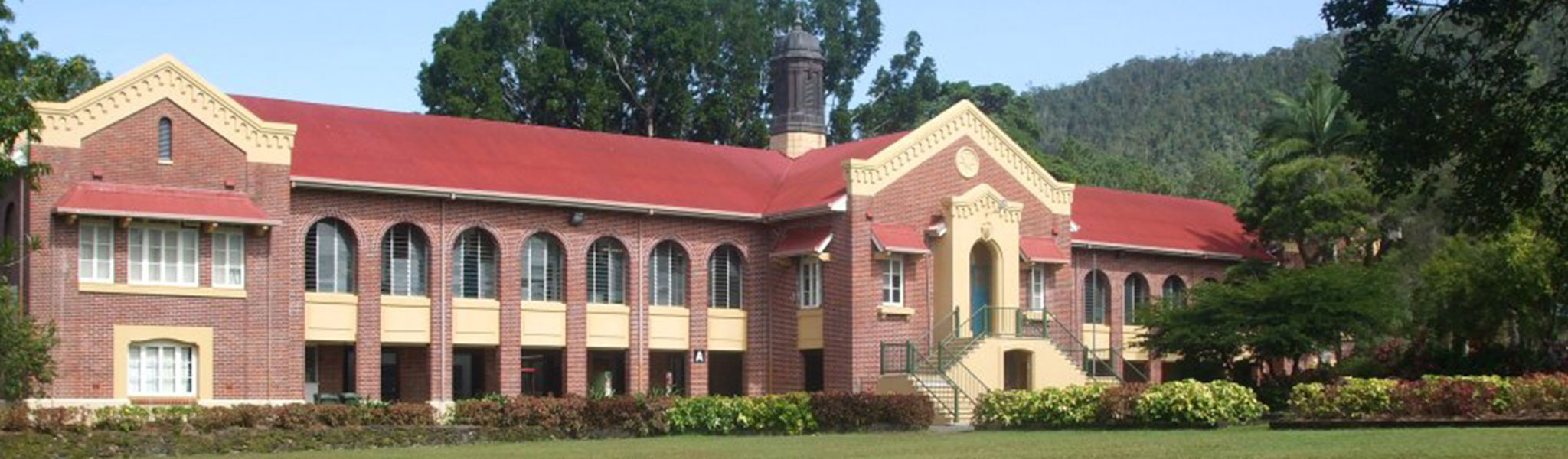
Tully State School, 2024

Tully State School is a government primary (Prep–6) school for boys and girls at 21 Mars Street (17.9386°S 145.9221°E). It includes a special education program. In 2018, the school had an enrolment of 247 students with 25 teachers (22 full-time equivalent) and 27 non-teaching staff (17 full-time equivalent).

St Clare's Catholic Primary School is a Catholic primary (Prep–6) school for boys and girls at 13 Mars Street (17.9371°S 145.9206°E). In 2018, the school had an enrolment of 153 students with 13 teachers (10 full-time equivalent) and 10 non-teaching staff (5 full-time equivalent).

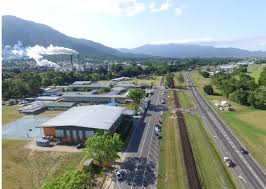
Tully State High School, 2023

Tully State High School is a government secondary (7–12) school for boys and girls at 59337 Bruce Highway (17.9401°S 145.9307°E). It includes a special educaition program. In 2018, the school had an enrolment of 688 students with 62 teachers (59 full-time equivalent) and 32 non-teaching staff (24 full-time equivalent). It also serves students in the Tully district, including Cardwell, Kennedy, Mission Beach, Wongaling Beach, Feluga, El Arish and various other small centres.

== Amenities ==
The Cassowary Coast Regional Council operates the Dorothy Jones Library at 34 Bryant Street.

The Tully branch of the Queensland Country Women's Association meets at the CWA Hall at 5 Plumb Street.

St Claire of Montefalco Catholic Church is at 13 Mars Street. It is within the Tully Parish of the Roman Catholic Diocese of Cairns.

== Facilities ==
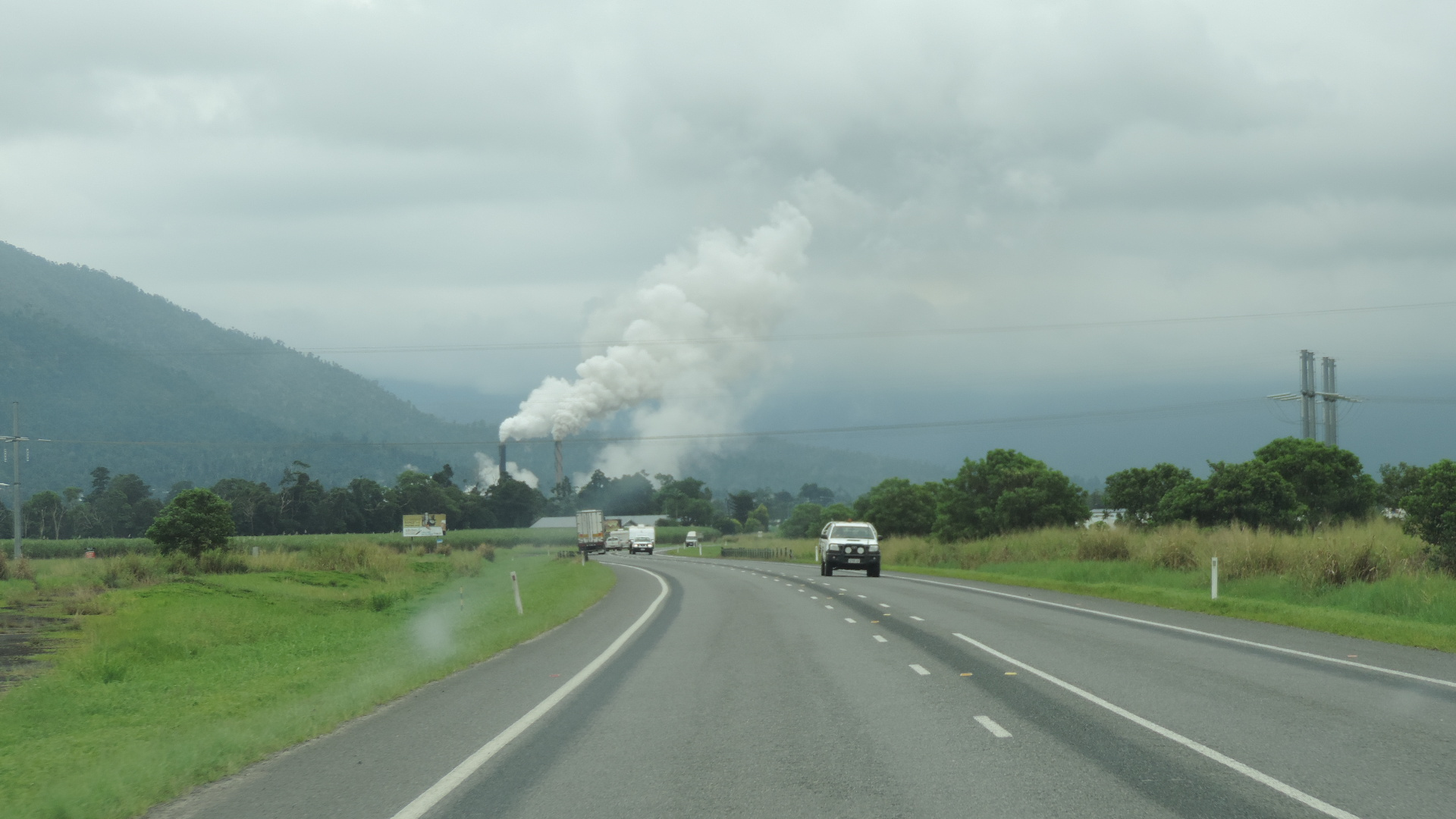
View towards Tully from the south on the Bruce Highway, 2016. The rising steam is from the Tully Sugar Mill

Tully Sugar Mill is in the south-east of the town (17.9379°S 145.9263°E).

Tully Hospital and Tully Ambulance Station are at 17 Bryant Street (17.9282°S 145.9246°E).

Tully Police Station is at 42 Bryant Street (17.9359°S 145.9231°E).

Tully Fire Station is at 22–24 Richardson Street (17.9332°S 145.9284°E).

Tully SES Facility is at 67 Bryant Street (17.9349°S 145.9229°E).

Tully Cemetery is on the south-west corner of Bryant Street and Tully Gorge Road (17.9478°S 145.9187°E). It is operated by the Cassowary Coast Regional Council.

== Sport ==
Tully Tigers, is the local Rugby League club. One of their most famous juniors is former Cowboys forward Peter Jones. Tully was once one of the biggest sporting hubs in Far North Queensland, but since the economic crisis has hit, they are looking for more and more ways to support their clubs.

== Attractions ==
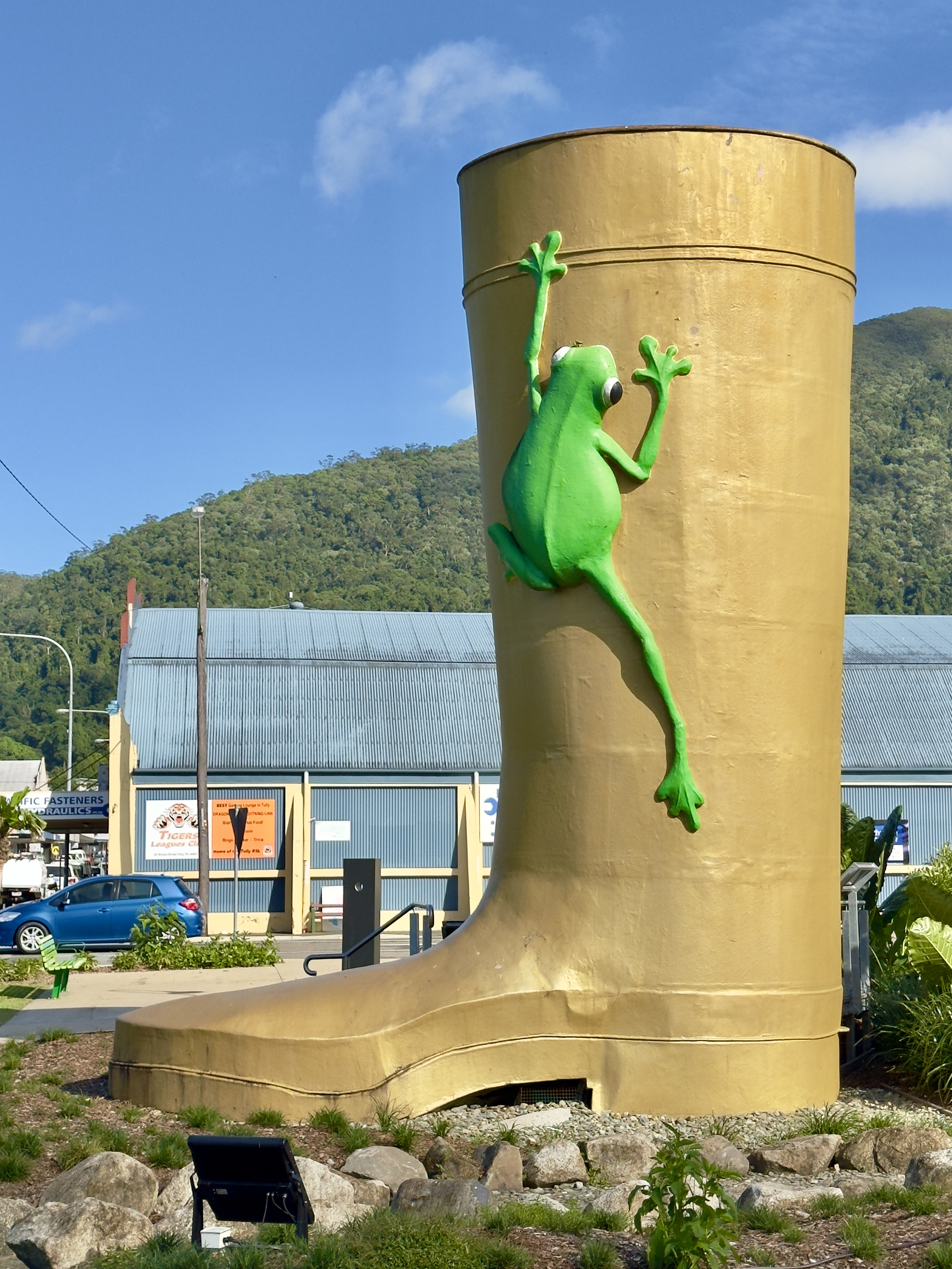
Golden Gumboot, 2025

The Golden Gumboot is in the park on corner of Butler Street and Hort Street (17.93395°S 145.92716°E). Built in 2003, the Gumboot is 6.1 metres long and 7.9 metres high. The height corresponds to highest annual rainfall in a populated area of Australia, which occurred in Tully in 1950. There is an internal spiral staircase to the top of the boot which provides views of the town. A fibreglass green tree frog is climbing the side of the boot. There is a museum beside the boot with the history of the town's floods.

== Military ==
The Australian Army's Combat Training Centre – Jungle Training Wing (CTC-JTW), is located on the outskirts of Tully. JTW are the Australian Army's experts in jungle warfare. Their primary role is to deliver basic and advanced jungle warfare training to dismounted combat team sized organizations. JTW are heavily engaged in international exercises, often providing training to regional allies, as their level of expertise is highly regarded in the international military community.

== Notable people ==
- Lisa Camilleri, squash player
- Kim Carroll, soccer player
- Jake Clifford, rugby league player
- Andrew Cripps, politician
- Paul Fleming, boxer, born in Tully
- Aila Keto, environmentalist
- Russell Kiefel, actor
- Shane Knuth, politician
- Ted Lindsay, politician
- Max Menzel, politician
- Keith Murdoch, All Blacks rugby player, lived in Tully
- Joel Riethmuller, rugby league player
- Craig Teitzel, rugby league player

== See also ==
- Kareeya Hydro Power Station
- List of tramways in Queensland
