= South Mission Beach =

- Town
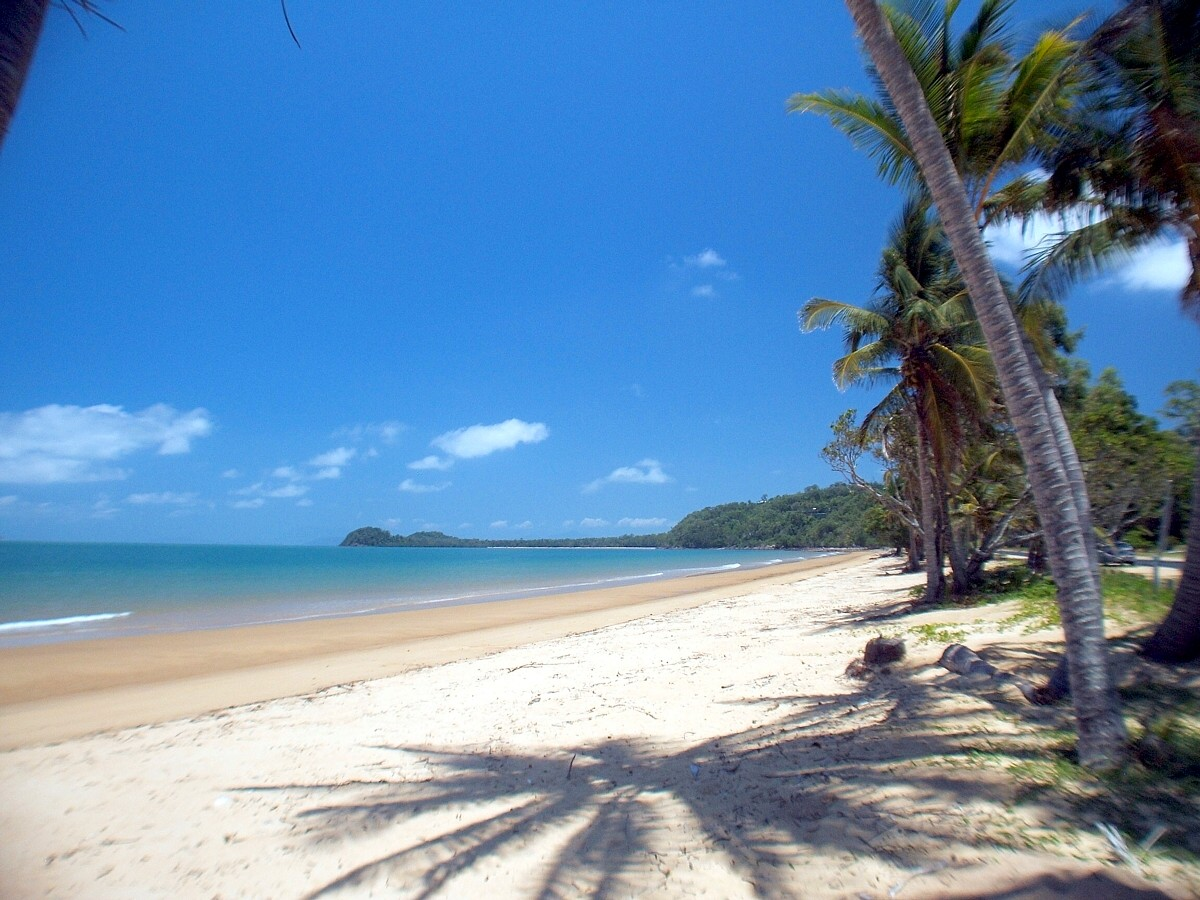
- South Mission Beach looking south towards Lugger Bay, 2004

- Interactive map of South Mission Beach
- Coordinates: 17.9433°S 146.0927°E
- Country: Australia
- State: Queensland
- LGA: Cassowary Coast Region
- Location: 25.7 km (16.0 mi) E of Tully; 59.2 km (36.8 mi) S of Innisfail; 146 km (91 mi) S of Cairns; 232 km (144 mi) NNW of Townsville; 1,584 km (984 mi) NNW of Brisbane

Government
  - State electorate: Hill
  - Federal division: Kennedy

Area
  - Total: 32.0 km^{2} (12.4 sq mi)

Population
  - Total: 968 (2021 census)
  - Density: 30.25/km^{2} (78.35/sq mi)
- Time zone: UTC+10:00 (AEST)
- Postcode: 4852
Localities around South Mission Beach
Tam O'Shanter	Wongaling Beach	Coral Sea
Carmoo	South Mission Beach	Dunk
Hull Heads	Hull Heads	Coral Sea

South Mission Beach is a coastal town and locality in the Cassowary Coast Region, Queensland, Australia. In the 2021 census, the locality of South Mission Beach had a population of 968 people.

== Geography ==
As the name suggests, South Mission Beach is south of Mission Beach, although not immediately south as the town of Wongaling Beach lies between them. The three towns are bounded on the east by a shared sandy beach 13 kilometres (8.1 mi) long facing the Coral Sea commencing at Clump Point in Mission Beach at the northern end through to Tam O'Shanter Point in South Mission Beach at the southern end (17.9666°S 146.1000°E).

South Mission Beach is bounded in the south and south-west by the Hull River with the North Hull River (a tributary of the Hull River) forming part of its north-western boundary. Most of the land in the locality is low-lying (less than 10 metres above sea level) and undeveloped and forms part of the Hull River National Park. However, there are some hills along the south-eastern coastline rising to unnamed peaks of up to 120 metres above sea level. The only development in the locality is residential along the north-east coast where the land is freehold.

The locality of South Mission Beach includes the former township of Kenny.

Tam O'Shanter Point creates two bays to the north and south of the headland, Lugger Bay to the north (17.9665°S 146.0966°E) and Kennedy Bay to the south (17.9762°S 146.0969°E).

Dunk Island lies off the coast.

There is only one road into the locality, South Mission Beach Road, which is a side-road of the more major Tully Mission Beach Road which connects to the Bruce Highway at Birkalla immediately to the north of Tully.

== History ==
The area lies within the traditional tribal territory of the JiDjiru-speaking Aboriginal people, who were closely related linguistically and culturally to the Jirrbal, Gulngay and Mamu speaking people in the adjacent rainforests.

Tam O'Shanter Point was named by Captain Owen Stanley of the Royal Navy survey ship HMS Rattlesnake, after the barque Tam O'Shanter which was the ship sailed by explorer Edmund Kennedy to North Queensland on his ill-fated expedition to reach Cape York Peninsula. Kennedy Bay was named after Edmund Kennedy.

The first European settlers in the general area were the Cutten family at present day Bingil Bay and the Garner family at present day Garners Beach. In 1912 the settlers arrived at present day South Mission Beach (the Reid family, Ben Beamon and George Webb).

In September 1913, 2,900 acres of land on the Hull River were gazetted as an Aboriginal Reserve creating the Hull River Aboriginal Settlement. On 15 September 1914 John Martin Kenny, who had previously been a non-commissioned officer of the native police and an overseer at the Cape Bedford Mission was appointed Superintendent at the new settlement. The settlement site was in the north of present-day South Mission Beach. On 10 March 1918 the settlement was demolished by a cyclone and the superintendent and his daughter were killed along with 12 Aboriginal people from the settlement. According to a report on the destruction of the settlement, over 400 Aboriginal people lived on the reserve at the time of the cyclone. The Hull River settlement was not rebuilt and many of the people were relocated from the reserve to Palm Island in 1918. All the materials at the Hull River settlement that might be useful at Palm Island were removed and then abandoned.

After the removal of the Hull River Aboriginal Settlement, European settlers moved to the area to farm. However, access remained principally by sea due to a lack of road access In December 1938 a road from Tully to the Mission Beach area was completed. A township which was established in 1939 was named Kenny in honour of John Martin Kenny of the Hull River Aboriginal Settlement, but it was known locally as South Mission Beach and was officially renamed so on 1 November 1963. The former township of Kenny was named after John Martin Kenny of the Hull River Aboriginal Settlement.

== Demographics ==
In the 2016 census, the locality of South Mission Beach had a population of 932 people.

In the 2021 census, the locality of South Mission Beach had a population of 968 people.

== Education ==
There are no schools in South Mission Beach. The nearest government primary school is Mission Beach State School in neighbouring Wongaling Beach to the north. The nearest government secondary school is Tully State High School in Tully to the south-west.

== Amenities ==
South Mission Beach is home to many community groups including a Surf Life Saver's Club, an Outriggers Club and a Scout Group.

There are two boat ramps, both managed by the Cassowary Coast Regional Council, at:

- Jackey Jackey Street into the North Hull River (17.9495°S 146.0832°E)
- south end of the Kennedy Esplanade into Lugger Bay (17.9508°S 146.0911°E)

== Attractions ==
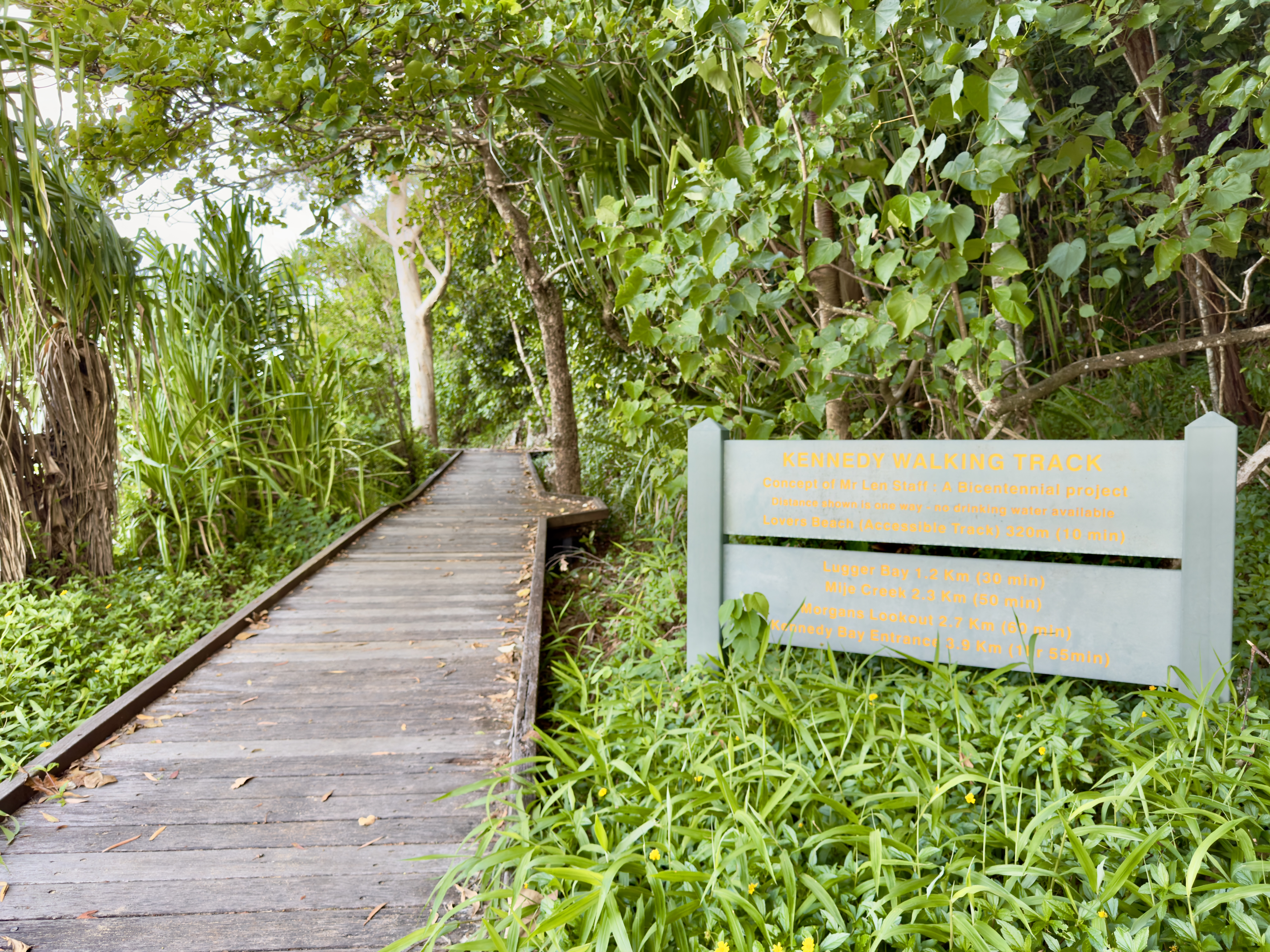
Kennedy Memorial Walking Track, South Mission Beach

The Kennedy walking track is a boardwalk that follows the coast just south of the town (starting at the Kennedy Esplanade boat ramp) and is known for giving hikers a glimpse into the coastal rainforests within the region.

The Mija Memorial, commemorating the victims of the cyclone at the Hull River Settlement, was unveiled 100 years later, on 10 March 2018. It is at the junction of South Mission Beach Road and the Kennedy Esplanade (17.93729°S 146.09427°E).
