= Tam o' Shanter =

"Tam o' Shanter" is a 1790 poem by Robert Burns.

Including variant spellings Tam O'Shanter or tam o' shanter, it may also refer to:

== Places ==
=== Australia ===
- Tam O'Shanter, Queensland, a locality in the Cassowary Coast Region, Queensland
- Tam O'Shanter Point, a headland in Queensland
- Tam O'Shanter National Park in Queensland, now known as Djiru National Park
- Tam O'Shanter Belt, South Australia, a historic suburb of Adelaide, South Australia

=== Canada ===
- Tam O'Shanter – Sullivan, a neighbourhood in the district of Scarborough of Toronto, Ontario. Also includes the municipal public golf course of the same name.

=== United States ===
- Tam O'Shanter Golf Course, in Niles, Illinois
- Tam O'Shanter Park, a city park in Kelso, Washington
- Sylvania Tam-O-Shanter, an ice rink and athletics complex in Sylvania, Ohio

== Other ==
- Tam O'Shanter (ship), a barque (1829–1837)
- Tam o' shanter (cap), a Scottish hat
- Tam O'Shanter (painting) by Eugène Delacroix
- Tam O'Shanter Overture, an orchestral overture written by English composer Malcolm Arnold
- Tam O' Shanter Inn, a 100-year-old Scottish-themed restaurant in Los Angeles, California
- Tam O'Shanter solitaire, a variation of the Auld Lang Syne solitaire card game
