= Garners Beach Burial Ground =

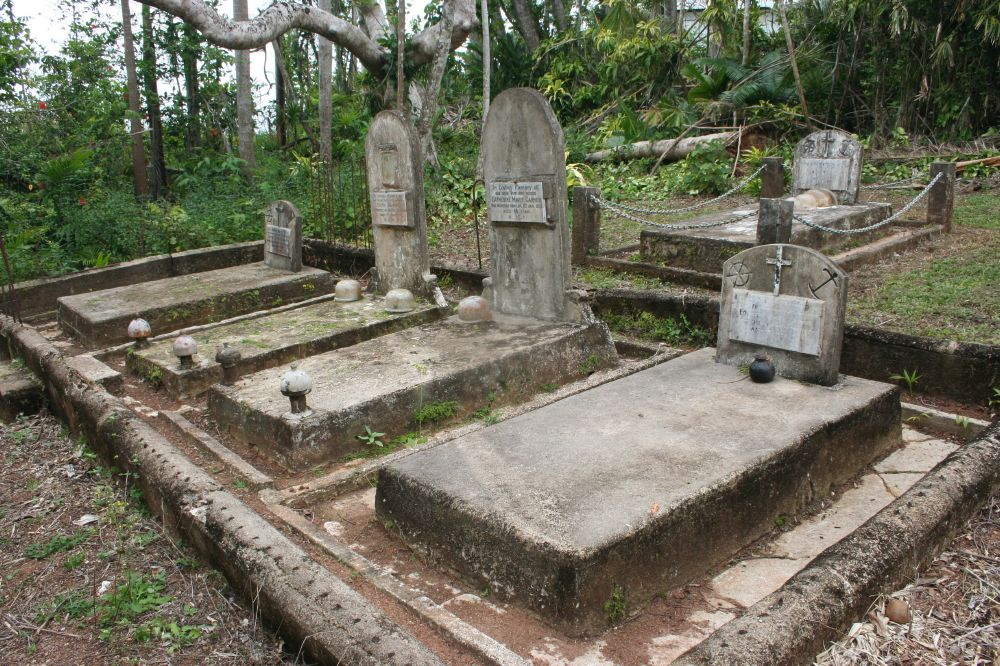
- Garners Beach Burial Ground, 2011

- Location within Queensland Location within Australia
- 17.8137°S 146.1016°E
- Location: Garners Beach Road, Garners Beach, Queensland, Australia

History
- Design period: 1919–1930s (interwar period)
- Built: 1935–1968

Queensland Heritage Register
- Official name: Garners Beach Burial Ground, Clump Point Private Cemetery, Garners Beach Cemetery, Wilford Hill
- Type: state heritage (built)
- Designated: 23 April 1999
- Reference no.: 601627
- Significant period: 1930s–1960s (fabric, historical use for burials)
- Significant components: burial/grave, headstone, grave surrounds/railings

Garners Beach Burial Ground is a heritage-listed cemetery at Garners Beach Road, Garners Beach, Cassowary Coast Region, Queensland, Australia. It was built from 1935 to 1968. It is also known as Clump Point Private Cemetery, Garners Beach Cemetery, and Wilford Hill. It was added to the Queensland Heritage Register on 23 April 1999.

== History ==
Garners Beach Burial Ground is associated with the settlement of the Muff Creek area, just north of Clump Point and Bingil Bay, by the Garner family, who held the land around Muff Creek from 1911 to the early 1970s.

The first of the Garner family to be associated with the beach were Edward Thomas Garner, his wife Edith Fay Johnson, and their 3 children. Edward and Edith and their first child, Edward Henry, emigrated to New South Wales c. 1889. ET Garner was a seaman, and had spent most of his life working on boats, or building them. It is thought that he came to Queensland in 1889 from Sydney, when he brought up to Townsville for the Hayles brothers, the boat with which they commenced their ferry service to Magnetic Island. Garner stayed in North Queensland and took up timber-getting. This occupation brought him to the Clump Point district, where he cut logs from the hills behind Mission Beach.

By c. 1900 the Garner family had settled in Cardwell, and in the early 1900s were engaged in ferrying stores, plants and equipment for the Chinese who were establishing banana plantations along the Hull River, and lightering plantation produce to the coastal steamers offshore, for transport to southern markets. In 1905 they took up a selection on the Murray River and established a sawmill there, producing packing cases for the banana trade. In 1909 they moved to Bingil Bay, where ET Garner, his son EH Garner, his nephew Arthur Garner of Mundoo, and his son-in-law Adolph (Lou) Wildsoet, erected and managed a sawmill for the Cutten family on their Bicton Plantation near Clump Point. The sawmill did not prove profitable for the Cuttens. They soon sold it, and the Garner family looked around for a selection of their own in the district.

Late in 1910, ET Garner made application to select portion 10v, parish of Hull, a block of just under 160 acres (65 ha) along Muff Creek, with a coastal frontage (now known as Garners Beach), extending from a promontory on the coast just north of Middle Beach, northwest to Cedar Creek. Much of this block was covered by dense tropical jungle or bloodwood, tea tree and mahogany forest. It had been surveyed and thrown open to selection in 1905, when the Maria Creeks district was opened up for the banana trade. Selected by F Dillon in 1905, it was forfeited by 1906, and offered for selection again in 1910 as an Agricultural Farm. In December 1910, ET Garner was granted a 20-year lease on the block from 1 January 1911, and was issued with a license to occupy it as an Agricultural Farm (AF 755).

On the Muff Creek selection, the ET Garners were joined by the families of their son Edward Henry and daughter Elizabeth Ann Wildsoet, and by Arthur Garner. The Garner-Wildsoet families cleared the land and grew bananas for export by sea. Several shipping companies – Adelaide Steamship, Howard Smith and AUSN lines – regularly picked up plantation produce off the various beaches or stream-mouths. The Garners built several boats on their Muff Creek selection – some as long as 60 feet (18 m) long, with steam or oil engines – and were heavily involved with lightering activity on Muff, Maria and Liverpool Creeks. They transported intending settlers, goods and supplies upstream, and farm produce downstream and out to the shipping company boats offshore. The family also attended to some of the navigation lights in the area. When sugar farms were established in the hinterland in the early 1910s, the Garners commenced lime production, blasting coral from King Reefs with gelignite. This was burnt at Garners Beach, and transported by boat to South Johnstone, for sale to sugar cane farmers.

By late 1915, over 40 acres (16 ha) of the Garner selection had been felled and was under cultivation: 30 acres (12 ha) under bananas, 8 acres (3.2 ha) under citrus fruits, and 3 acres (1.2 ha) under pineapples; with a further 5 acres (2.0 ha) felled, burnt and partly cleared. Much of the unskilled work was done by local Aborigines, who were paid in food and tools, apparently to everyone's mutual satisfaction. Four 4-roomed houses of silky oak with galvanised iron roofs (prefabricated buildings shipped from Townsville) had been constructed, and improvements included outbuildings and a lime kiln. The property was known as Wilford Hill – presumably named after Wilford Hill, Nottingham, England where Edward Thomas and Edith Fay were married in 1886.

During the First World War (1914–1918), only ET Garner, his wife and youngest daughter (Nellie) remained at the beach. Arthur Garner joined the Australian Imperial Force and served at Gallipoli, and EH Garner and his family left the beach to take up timber-hauling work near Silkwood. The principal shipping companies, with many of their vessels commandeered for war purposes, curtailed their coastal trade, and Clump Point settlers like the Garners lost access to southern markets. However, until the completion of the North Coast railway line from Brisbane to Cairns in 1924, ET Garner still found work for his boats, which his daughter helped him to run. For a while the coastal steamers continued to call at the wharf in Maria Creek established by the Adelaide Steamship Company c. 1904, and the Garner boats ferried the cargoes of most of the Clump Point growers from their beaches to the wharf. The loss of markets was compounded by a severe cyclone in 1918, which devastated the district, destroying houses, plantations, boats and a newly completed government wharf near Clump Point. The ET Garner's house, built halfway up Wilford Hill, was swept away.

By the early 1920s, ET Garner had acquired adjoining selection no. 1174, and was resident there from at least 1921 to 1924. By late 1925, the Garners had returned to portion 10v, where they had about 800 citrus trees and 12 acres (4.9 ha) under bananas. There was a 5-roomed house on the property, 5 small accommodation huts, and a cow bail and yards. It is understood that the galvanised iron huts were erected in the 1920s as fishing/holiday accommodation for use by the Garner family, their visitors and paying holiday-makers, but served a more charitable purpose during the 1930s. JG Tierney, who married into the Garner family, later recalled:

Many years later as I moved to different areas in the North with my wife and family I would work with men who, when told that my wife was a Garner from Garners Beach, would tell me of the fond memories of good times they had spent at Garners Beach and I started to realise that there was a story to the family that I didn't know and was never mentioned by them. As I understand it, during the 1930s depression some people who came on hard times were welcome to stay at the beach and as the area was nearly self-supporting nobody went hungry and after a period of time as they sorted themselves out would move on and continue with their lives.

In 1931, ET Garner applied for an extension of his lease on Agricultural Farm no.755 (portion 10v). This was approved and extended to 30 years from 1 January 1911. A January 1931 inspection of the property concluded that it was a very well improved farm, recently extra good improvements effected for dairying.

By mid-1935, the property was being managed by Lou Wildsoet and his sons. On 24 August 1935, Edith Garner, aged 67 years, died at Wilford Hill. She was buried the following day near her home, in what is now known as Garners Beach Burial Ground, the first interment there. ET Garner retired to Tully, and in 1937 his lease on AF755 was transferred to his son, who in 1941 obtained title to the land as freehold.

The second interment at Garner's Beach was that of Catherine Mary Garner (née Wildsoet), wife of EH Garner, who died on 1 January 1937 at Tully District Hospital following a car accident, and was buried at Wilford Hill the next day. A late 1930s photograph indicates that a barbed wire fence once delineated the boundary of the burial ground.

By October 1939, EH Garner was making little use of Wilford Hill other than to run a few dairy cattle, devoting most of his time to operating a hire boat, taking fishing parties to the Great Barrier Reef. He was also rafting logs to Dunk Island for trans-shipping. During the Second World War (1939–45) several of EH Garner's children served with the armed forces. After the war his sons returned to Garner's Beach, built a 45-foot (14 m) boat they called the Day Spring, and into the 1950s continued taking boating parties around the Reef.

ET Garner died at Tully District Hospital on 4 July 1945, aged 86 years, and was buried the next day at the Clump Point Private Cemetery. This was the third burial at Garners Beach.

From 1951, the Garner family began to subdivide portion 10v, and in the late 1950s/early 1960s several holiday homes were constructed near Garner's Beach, including the retreat of Australian Treasurer and later Prime Minister, Harold Holt. The Holt residence was located near the Garner graves.

In the 1960s two more members of the Garner family were laid to rest at Garner's Beach: Edward Henry Garner, who died at the Innisfail District Hospital on 27 March 1965, aged almost 77 years; and Edward Christian Garner, son of Edward Henry Garner and Catherine Mary Wildsoet, who died at the Innisfail District Hospital on 18 August 1968, aged 59 years.

Following EH Garner's death, title to nearly 26 acres (11 ha) at Garners Beach, which included the burial ground, was transferred in 1965 to his son and daughter-in-law, Stanley Douglas Garner and Elsie Norma Garner. They in turn sold the property, including the burial ground, to the Kenny family in 1972.

== Description ==
Garners Beach, lying southeast–northwest, is situated in a large bay between Ninney and Murdering Points, a couple of kilometres north of Bingil Bay. Middle Beach separates Garner's Beach from Bingil Bay.

The southeastern end of Garner's Beach forms a small bay, where the Garner family established their settlement. The beach is about a kilometre in length with a rocky outcrop at the northwest end. Past these rocks is another small beach (Carstairs), also terminated by a rocky outcrop, and north of this is Figtree Beach, bounded by Muff Creek to the south and Maria Creek to the north. Kurrimine Beach lies on the north side of Maria Creek.

The burial ground is located on private property about halfway up a promontory (Wilford Hill) at the southeastern end of Garner's Beach, and is accessed from Garner's Beach Road. The site is approximately 200 metres (660 ft) from the flat where most of the early 20th century settlement occurred, and occupies a small area 12 by 13 metres (39 by 43 ft), defined by, and partly including, vehicular tracks in use on the property.

The burial ground contains the graves of five members of the Garner family: Edith Fay Garner (buried 25 August 1935), Catherine Mary Garner (buried 2 January 1937), Thomas Edward Garner (buried 5 July 1945), Edward Henry Garner (buried 29 March 1965), and Edward Christian Garner (buried 20 August 1968). The graves are located in close proximity to each other, and face west. Four of the graves share a common concrete grave kerbing, 250 millimetres (9.8 in) high by 150 millimetres (5.9 in) wide, which has remnant evidence of a simple worked metal surround. The grave of Edward Christian Garner lies immediately east of the other graves, and has a separate concrete surround with concrete corner posts with chain metal strung between them. Each of the graves has a concrete headstone, with a marble plaque attached. The headstones of the three men buried here each displays a sequence of three symbols, in bas-relief and painted black, at the top of the headstone: a ship's wheel, a Christian cross, and a ship's anchor.

== Heritage listing ==
Garners Beach Burial Ground was listed on the Queensland Heritage Register on 23 April 1999 having satisfied the following criteria.

The place is important in demonstrating the evolution or pattern of Queensland's history.

Garner's Beach Burial Ground has a close association with the work of the Garner family – farmers, boat builders and boat operators – in developing the Clump Point district as a fruit-producing region in the early 20th century.

The place has a special association with the life or work of a particular person, group or organisation of importance in Queensland's history.

The family was well-known and highly regarded in the local community, and in their boat building and boat operating activities in particular, made a significant contribution to the development of the area.
