= Bingil Bay, Queensland =

Town in Queensland, Australia

Bingil Bay
- Town
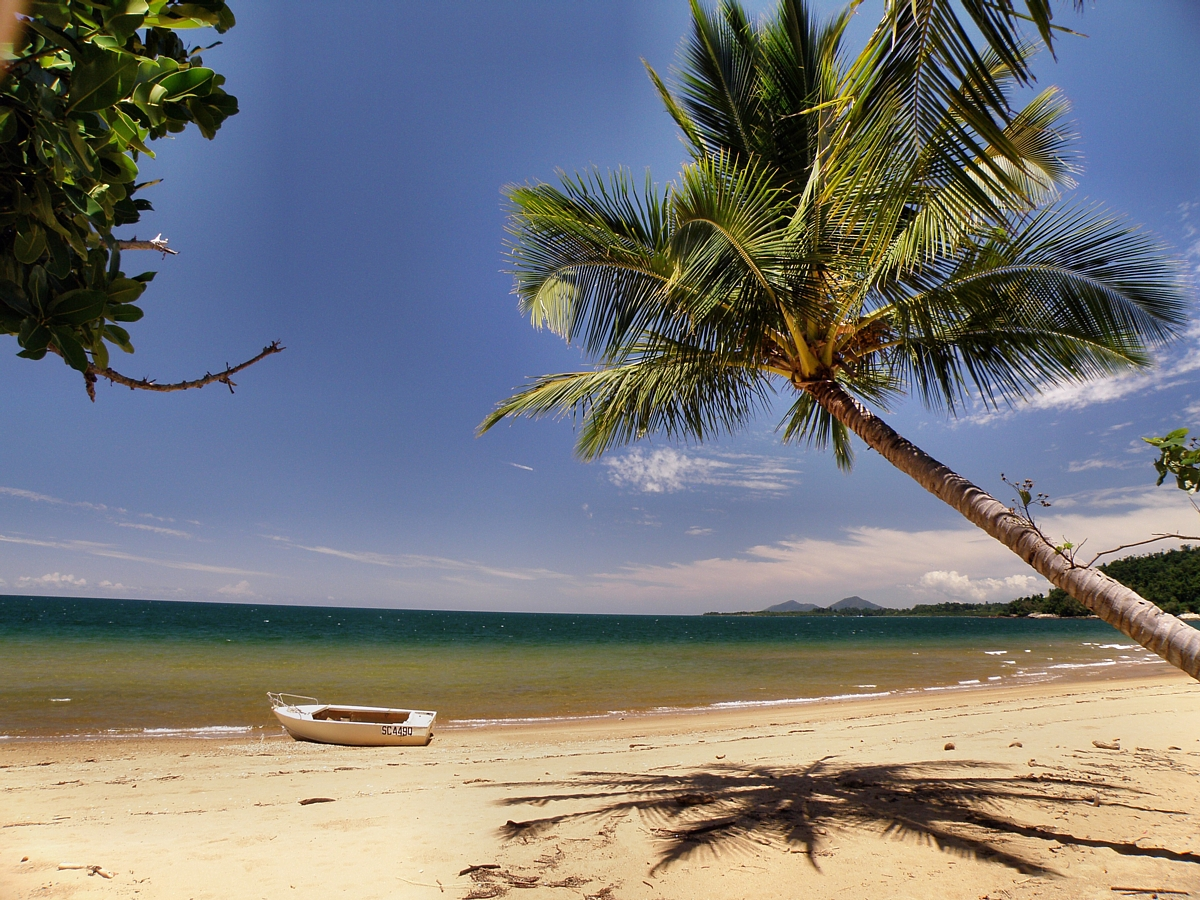
- Timber boat on Bingil Bay beach, 2009

- Interactive map of Bingil Bay
- Coordinates: 17.8316°S 146.0969°E
- Country: Australia
- State: Queensland
- LGA: Cassowary Coast Region
- Location: 6.8 km (4.2 mi) NNW of Mission Beach; 31.0 km (19.3 mi) S of Tully; 49.3 km (30.6 mi) S of Innisfail; 137 km (85 mi) S of Cairns; 1,569 km (975 mi) NNW of Brisbane

Government
  - State electorate: Hill
  - Federal division: Kennedy

Area
  - Total: 4.7 km^{2} (1.8 sq mi)

Population
  - Total: 438 (2021 census)
  - Density: 93.2/km^{2} (241.4/sq mi)
- Time zone: UTC+10:00 (AEST)
- Postcode: 4852
Localities around Bingil Bay
Midgeree Bar	Garners Beach	Coral Sea
Djiru	Bingil Bay	Coral Sea
Djiru	Djiru	Coral Sea

Bingil Bay is a coastal town, locality and bay in the Cassowary Coast Region of Queensland, Australia. Bingil Bay, along with North Mission, Wongaling and South Mission, form the coastal township of Mission Beach. In the 2021 census, the locality of Bingil Bay had a population of 438 people.

== Geography ==
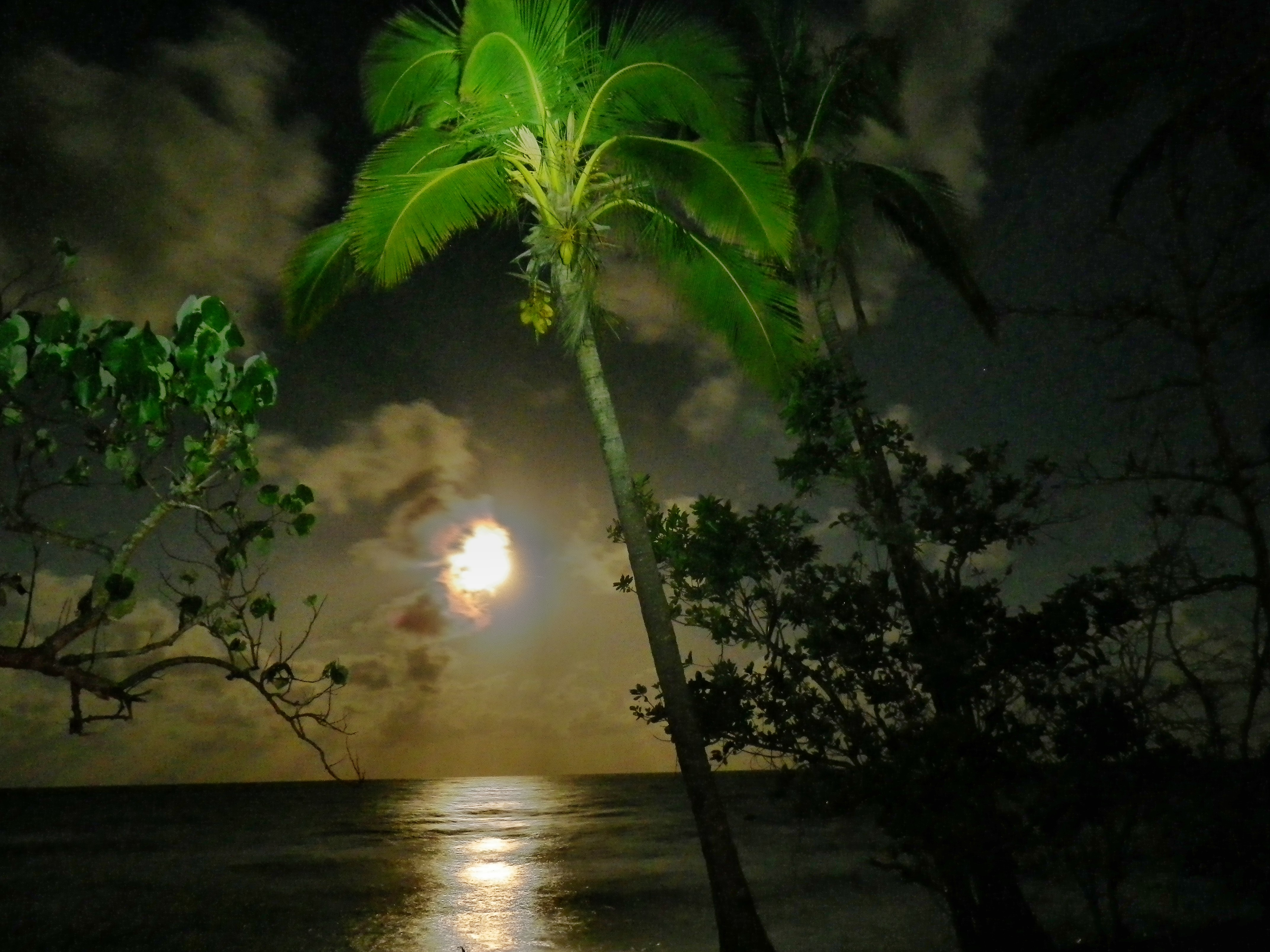
Moonlight over Bingil Bay boat ramp, 2011

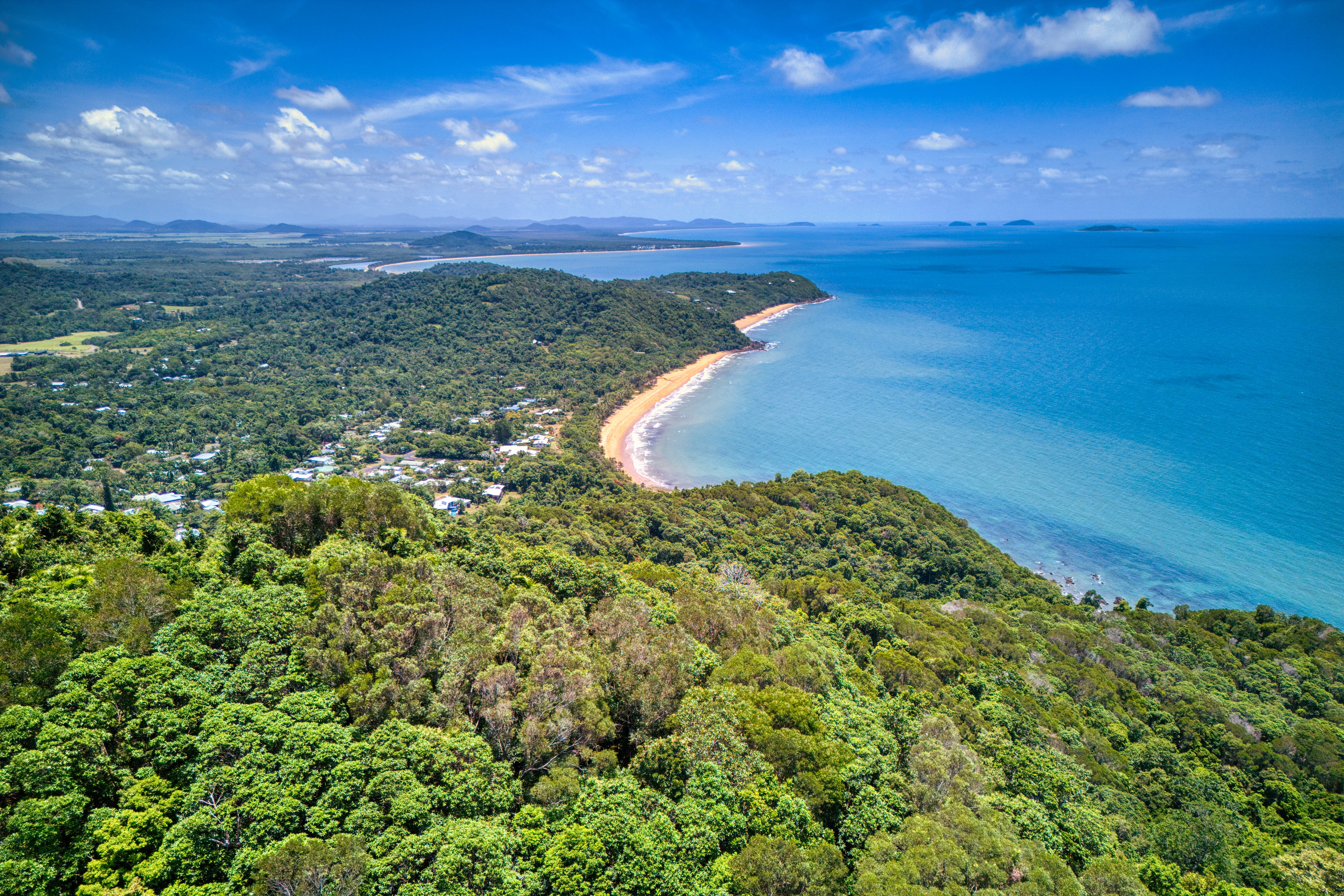
Bingil Bay area from Bicton Hill lookout, 2024

The locality of Bingil Bay is bounded to the east by the bay of the same name with Ninney Point (17.8333°S 146.1°E) on the north-east coast. A long sandy beach extends south from Ninney Point along the coastline. The town is in the south-eastern corner of the locality.

The land use is a mixture of residential, growing tropical fruit), and grazing on native vegetation.

== History ==
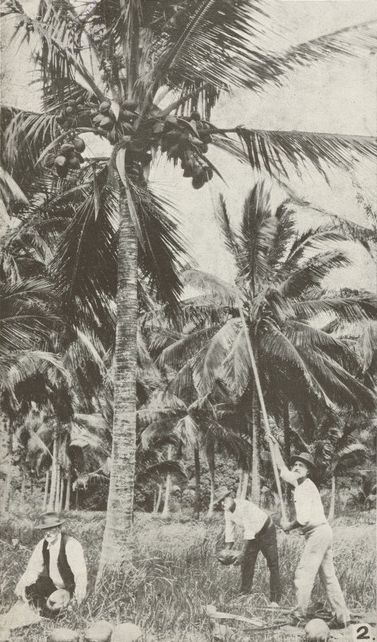
Cutten family harvesting coconuts, 1917

The name Bingil is believed to be an Aboriginal word meaning a good camping ground given to the area by Frederick Cutten, a pioneer settler in the area.

In 1884, the Cutten brothers (Frederick, Leonard, Sydney and James) established the first commercial tea plantation in Australia on their Bicton estate at Bingil Bay, also growing coffee, mangoes, bananas, pineapples and other tropical fruit. At that time, Bingil Bay was only accessible by boat. Most of the Bicton estate was destroyed by a cyclone in 1918 and although the homestead was rebuilt the remainder of the estate was never restored. The descendants of the original tea plants were rediscovered in the rain-forest by Dr Allan Maruff in 1958 and seedlings from these plants formed the basis for the Nerada Tea plantations.

In 1921, an overland connection was created from El Arish (a distance of 10 kilometres (6.2 mi) away) but it was only usable by a dray and the journey took most of the day.

The area was formerly known as Clump Point (the name of a nearby headland) until 1929 when a post office called Bingal Bay was established.

On 9 July 1936, the road from El Arish to Bingil Bay was finally completed, reducing the travel time to 30 minutes. It was officially opened by Percy Pease, the Member of the Queensland Legislative Assembly for Herbert.

The Bingil Bay Lifesaving Club opened in 1936.

Around 1966, then Prime Minister of Australia, Harold Holt and his wife Zara Holt, owned a holiday cottage they called "The Shack" at Bingil Bay. It sat high on the hill with views as far as Dunk Island. The couple were keen spearfishers. The cottage did not have a telephone.

== Demographics ==
In the 2011 census, the locality of Bingil Bay had a population of 369 people.

In the 2016 census, the locality of Bingil Bay had a population of 427 people.

In the 2021 census, the locality of Bingil Bay had a population of 438 people.

== Heritage listings ==
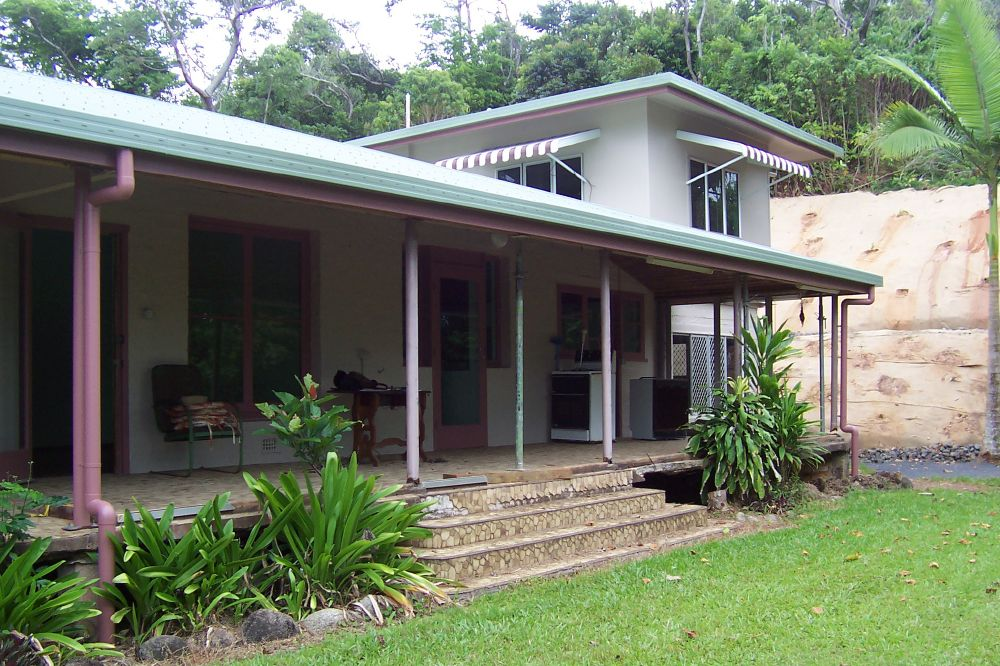
Ninney Rise, 2003

Bingil Bay has the following heritage sites:

- Ninney Rise, 405 Alexander Drive and Esplanade (17.8279°S 146.1007°E)
- Cutten Brothers' Graves, Holt Court (17.8355°S 146.0985°E)

== Education ==
There are no schools in Bingil Bay. The nearest government primary schools are Mission Beach State School in Wongaling Beach to the south and El Arish State School in El Arish to the west. The nearest government secondary school is Tully State High School in Tully to the south-west.

== Amenities ==
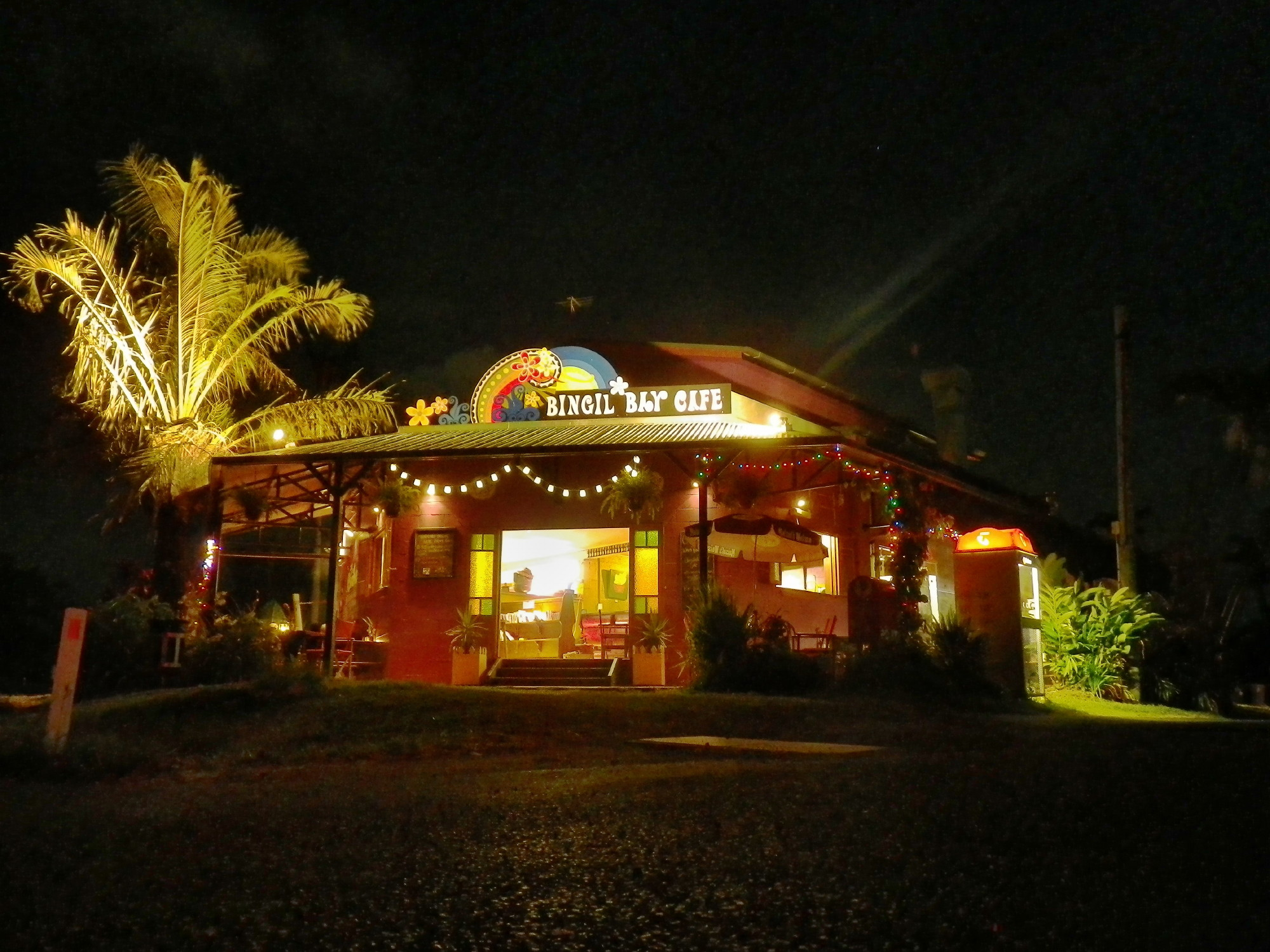
Bingil Bay Cafe at night, 2011

Bingil Bay Cafe has meals and basic groceries. It is located at 39 Bingil Bay Road, Bingil Bay (17.8300°S 146.0950°E).

Jackaroo Treehouse Rainforest Retreat is the preferred accommodation location for people looking to stay in a more tropical setting when staying in the local area. Located at 13 Frizelle Road, Bingil Bay (Off Bingil Bay Road), the Jackaroo Treehouse offers private rooms, family rooms and shared rooms, all set in a giant treehouse overlooking the rainforest.

Jack’s Jungle Bar & Cafe is a local hotspot for young travellers and locals alike. Located at the Jackaroo Treehouse, it offers meals, cold drinks and alcoholic drinks, all while overlooking world heritage rainforests.
