= Midgeree Bar, Queensland =

Midgeree Bar
- Suburb
- Interactive map of Midgeree Bar
- Coordinates: 17.8080°S 146.0722°E
- Country: Australia
- State: Queensland
- LGA: Cassowary Coast Region
- Location: 28.0 km (17.4 mi) NE of Tully; 46.4 km (28.8 mi) S of Innisfail; 134 km (83 mi) SSE of Cairns; 234 km (145 mi) NNW of Townsville; 1,583 km (984 mi) NNW of Brisbane

Government
  - State electorate: Hill
  - Federal division: Kennedy

Area
  - Total: 11.9 km^{2} (4.6 sq mi)

Population
  - Total: 75 (2021 census)
  - Density: 6.30/km^{2} (16.32/sq mi)
- Time zone: UTC+10:00 (AEST)
- Postcode: 4852
Suburbs around Midgeree Bar
| Daveson | Kurrimine Beach | Kurrimine Beach |
| Maria Creeks | Midgeree Bar | Garners Beach |
| Maria Creeks | Djiru | Bingil Bay |

Midgeree Bar is a coastal rural locality in the Cassowary Coast Region, Queensland, Australia. In the 2021 census, Midgeree Bar had a population of 75 people.

== Geography ==
The locality is bounded by the north-east by Maria Creek which enters the Coral Sea. The locality's access to the coastline is limited to the southern side of the creek mouth.

The land use is a mixture of grazing on native vegetation, crop growing (mostly sugarcane) and aquaculture (prawn hatchery and farming).

== Demographics ==
In the 2016 census, Midgeree Bar had a population of 49 people.

In the 2021 census, Midgeree Bar had a population of 75 people.

== Education ==
There are no schools in Midgeree Bar. The nearest government primary school is El Arish State School in El Arish to the west. The nearest government secondary school is Tully State High School in Tully to the south-west.
