= Tam O'Shanter, Queensland =

Tam O'Shanter
- Suburb
- Interactive map of Tam O'Shanter
- Coordinates: 17.9138°S 146.0616°E
- Country: Australia
- State: Queensland
- LGA: Cassowary Coast Region
- Location: 8.2 km (5.1 mi) SW of Mission Beach; 20.1 km (12.5 mi) E of Tully; 56.6 km (35.2 mi) S of Innisfail; 144 km (89 mi) S of Cairns; 1,584 km (984 mi) NNW of Brisbane

Government
  - State electorate: Hill
  - Federal division: Kennedy

Area
  - Total: 20.6 km^{2} (8.0 sq mi)

Population
  - Total: 0 (2021 census)
  - Density: 0.000/km^{2} (0.00/sq mi)
- Time zone: UTC+10:00 (AEST)
- Postcode: 4852
Suburbs around Tam O'Shanter
Granadilla	Djiru	Wongaling Beach
Granadilla	Tam O'Shanter	Wongaling Beach
Mount Mackay	Carmoo	South Mission Beach

Tam O'Shanter is a rural locality in the Cassowary Coast Region, Queensland, Australia. In the 2021 census, Tam O'Shanter had "no people or a very low population".

== Geography ==
Mount Tam O'Shanter (17.9129°S 146.0394°E) is at the westernmost point of the locality, rising to 381 metres (1,250 ft). From the mountain, the locality is bounded to the south-west by the Tam O'Shanter Range.

The locality is entirely within a number of protected areas, mostly within the Djiru National Park but with a small area in the south-east of the locality being within the Tam O'Shanter Forest Reserve.

== History ==
The locality presumably takes its name from Tam O'Shanter Point on the coastline nearby. The point was named by Captain Owen Stanley of HMS Rattlesnake after the barque Tam O'Shanter, which carried Edmund Kennedy's ill-fated expedition to North Queensland in 1848. TheTam O'Shanter, of 270 tons (bm) and homeport Liverpool, had been launched at Workington in 1836.

== Demographics ==
In the 2016 census, Tam O'Shanter had "no people or a very low population".

In the 2021 census, Tam O'Shanter had "no people or a very low population".
