= Granadilla, Queensland =

Granadilla
- Suburb
- Interactive map of Granadilla
- Coordinates: 17.8658°S 146.0255°E
- Country: Australia
- State: Queensland
- LGA: Cassowary Coast Region
- Location: 17.9 km (11.1 mi) NE of Tully; 37.6 km (23.4 mi) S of Innisfail; 125 km (78 mi) S of Cairns; 224 km (139 mi) NNW of Townsville; 1,587 km (986 mi) NNW of Brisbane

Government
  - State electorate: Hill
  - Federal division: Kennedy

Area
  - Total: 32.3 km^{2} (12.5 sq mi)
- Elevation: 10–380 m (33–1,247 ft)

Population
  - Total: 101 (2021 census)
  - Density: 3.127/km^{2} (8.10/sq mi)
- Time zone: UTC+10:00 (AEST)
- Postcode: 4855
Suburbs around Granadilla
El Arish	Maria Creeks	Maria Creeks
Friday Pocket	Granadilla	Djiru
East Feluga	Mount Mackay	Tam O'Shanter

Granadilla is a rural locality in the Cassowary Coast Region, Queensland, Australia. In the 2021 census, Granadilla had a population of 101 people.

== Geography ==
The locality is loosely bounded to the west, south-west, south, south-east and east by the Walter Hill Range.

There is considerable difference in the elevation within the locality from 380 metres (1,250 ft) in the ranges in the south through to 10 metres (33 ft) in the north of the locality. Consequently, numerous creeks rise in the ranges in the south and flow through the central valley towards the north of the locality.

The higher more mountainous land in the south is undeveloped. Some grazing on native vegetation occurs in the lower slopes in the south of the locality. In the low-lying north of the locality, the land use is predominantly growing sugarcane.

== History ==
Granadilla State School opened in 1937 and closed circa 1941. It was on the southern corner of Granadilla Road and Banfield Road (17.8580°S 146.0285°E).

The locality was officially named and bounded on 21 January 2000.

== Demographics ==
In the 2016 census, Granadilla had a population of 88 people.

In the 2021 census, Granadilla had a population of 101 people.

== Education ==
There are no schools in Granadilla. The nearest government primary schools are El Arish State School in El Arish to the north-west and Mission Beach State School in Wongaling Beach to the east. The nearest government secondary school is Tully State High School in Tully to the south-west.
