= Maria Creeks, Queensland =

Maria Creeks
- Suburb
- Interactive map of Maria Creeks
- Coordinates: 17.8236°S 146.0341°E
- Country: Australia
- State: Queensland
- LGA: Cassowary Coast Region
- Location: 19.9 km (12.4 mi) NE of Tully; 38.4 km (23.9 mi) S of Innisfail; 126 km (78 mi) S of Cairns; 226 km (140 mi) NW of Townsville; 1,584 km (984 mi) NNW of Brisbane

Government
  - State electorate: Hill
  - Federal division: Kennedy

Area
  - Total: 19.4 km^{2} (7.5 sq mi)

Population
  - Total: 143 (2021 census)
  - Density: 7.37/km^{2} (19.09/sq mi)
- Time zone: UTC+10:00 (AEST)
- Postcode: 4855
Suburbs around Maria Creeks
El Arish	Daveson	Midgeree Bar
Granadilla	Maria Creeks	Midgeree Bar
Granadilla	Djiru	Djiru

Maria Creeks is a rural locality in the Cassowary Coast Region, Queensland, Australia. In the 2021 census, Maria Creeks had a population of 143 people.

== Geography ==
The locality is bounded to the north-west by Big Maria Creek, by the north by Kaygaroo Creek, to the north-east by South Maria Creek, and to the south-east by the El Arish - Mission Beach Road.

Big Maria Creek becomes a tributary of the Kaygaroo Creek at the north-west of the locality, while Kaygaroo Creek becomes a tributary of South Maria Creek at the north-east of the locality. Beyond the locality, the South Maria Creek becomes a tributary of Maria Creek which flows into the Coral Sea at neighbouring Midgeree Bar.

Mount Edna is in the west of the locality (17.8234°S 146.0304°E) rising to 163 metres (535 ft) above sea level.

El Arish - Mission Beach Road enters the locality from the north-east (El Arish) and then proceeds south-east across the locality before becoming the south-eastern boundary of the locality before exiting to the south-east (Djiru).

The land use is mixed. Towards the north-west of the locality, the predominant land use is growing sugarcane. To the east of the locality, the predominant land use is grazing on native vegetation. The land around Mount Edna is more mountainous and is undeveloped. There are also some pockets of rural residential housing.

There is a cane tramway network in the sugar-growing part of the locality to transport the harvested sugarcane to the Tully sugar mill.

== History ==
Land in this area formed part of the soldier settlement at Maria Creek established after World War I.

== Demographics ==
In the 2016 census, Maria Creeks had a population of 121 people.

In the 2021 census, Maria Creeks had a population of 143 people.

== Education ==
There are no government schools in Maria Creeks. The nearest government primary school is El Arish State School in neighbouring El Arish to the north-west. The nearest government secondary school is Tully State High School in Tully to the south-west.
