= Djiru, Queensland =

Djiru
- Suburb
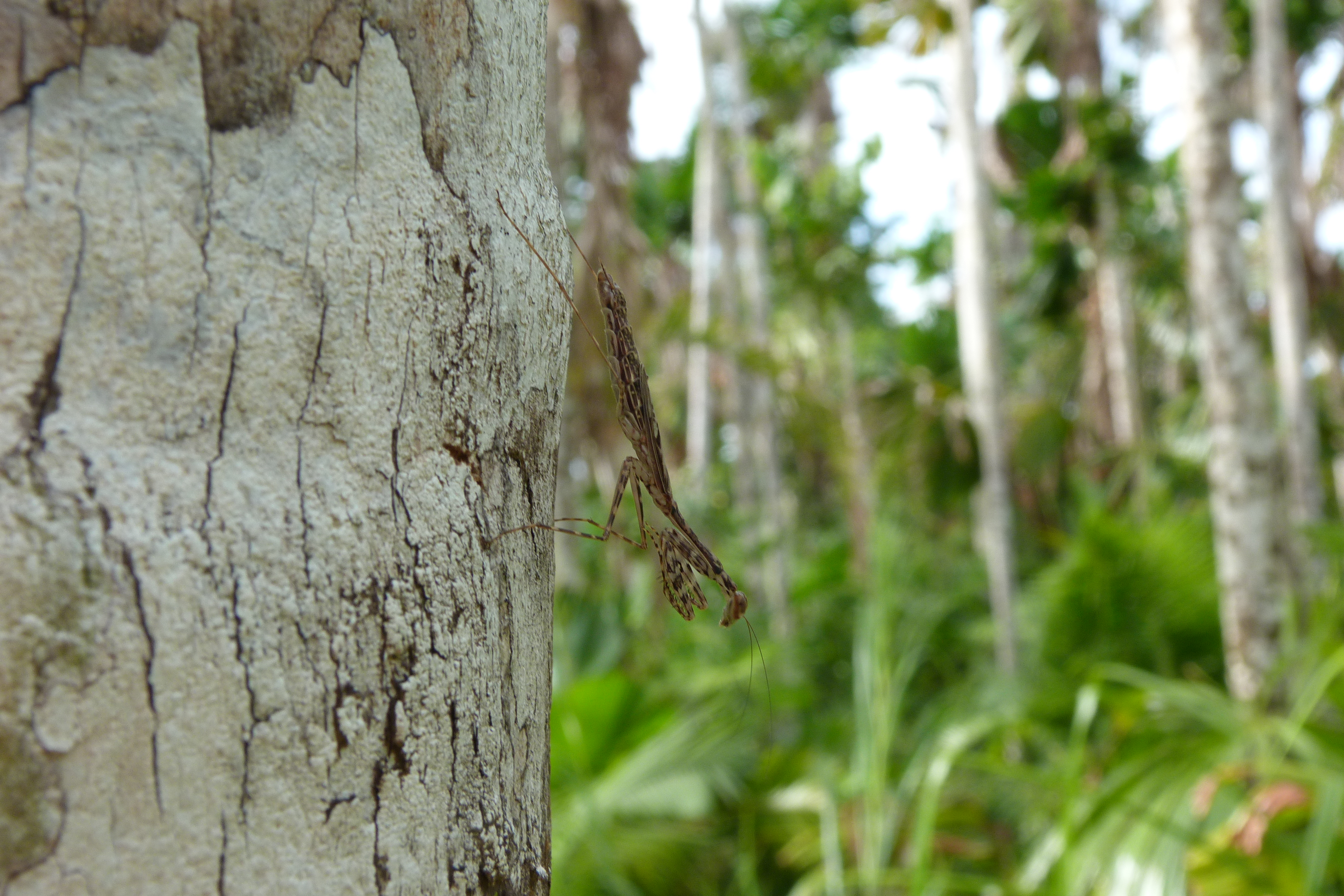
- Djiru National Park, 2012

- Interactive map of Djiru
- Coordinates: 17.8558°S 146.0763°E
- Country: Australia
- State: Queensland
- LGA: Cassowary Coast Region
- Location: 31.4 km (19.5 mi) NE of Tully; 46.8 km (29.1 mi) S of Innisfail; 134 km (83 mi) S of Cairns; 235 km (146 mi) NNW of Townsville; 1,591 km (989 mi) NNW of Brisbane

Government
  - State electorate: Hill
  - Federal division: Kennedy

Area
  - Total: 24.1 km^{2} (9.3 sq mi)

Population
  - Total: 0 (2021 census)
  - Density: 0.000/km^{2} (0.00/sq mi)
- Postcode: 4852
Suburbs around Djiru
Maria Creeks	Midgeree Bar	Bingil Bay
Tam O'Shanter	Djiru	Coral Sea
Granadilla	Wongaling Beach	Mission Beach

Djiru is a coastal locality in the Cassowary Coast Region, Queensland, Australia. In the 2021 census, Djiru had "no people or a very low population".

== Geography ==
Djiru has a small stretch of coastline beside Bingil Bay (17.8318°S 146.1012°E) with a small sandy beach known as Wee Beach (17.8419°S 146.1042°E).

Djiru has the following mountains and passes (from north to south):

- Double Mountain (17.8238°S 146.0694°E) 294 metres (965 ft)
- Clump Mountain (17.8445°S 146.0885°E) 395 metres (1,296 ft)
- Fenbys Gap (17.8665°S 146.0747°E)
- Luff Hill (17.8810°S 146.0792°E) 189 metres (620 ft)
- Jurs Gap (17.8851°S 146.0689°E)
- Hull Gap (17.8866°S 146.0738°E)

The El Arish Mission Beach Road enters the locality from Maria Creeks to the north-west, forming part of the north-western boundary of the locality before travelling east through the locality, exiting to Mission Beach to the south-east.

Djiru National Park occupies most of the locality and preserves the lowland rainforest in the Wet Tropics that has been vanishing since the European colonisation.

The land use is predominantly nature conservation.

== History ==
In December 2005, the Queensland Government gazetted Tam O'Shanter National Park. It was renamed Djiru National Park in December 2009 to recognise Djiru Aboriginal people as the traditional owners of the land.

== Demographics ==
In the 2016 census, Djiru had "no people or a very low population".

In the 2021 census, Djiru had "no people or a very low population".

== Education ==
There are no schools in Djiru. The nearest government primary school is Mission Beach State School in neighbouring Wongaling Beach to the south. The nearest government secondary school is Tully State High School in Tully to the south-west.
