= Garners Beach, Queensland =

Garners Beach
- Suburb
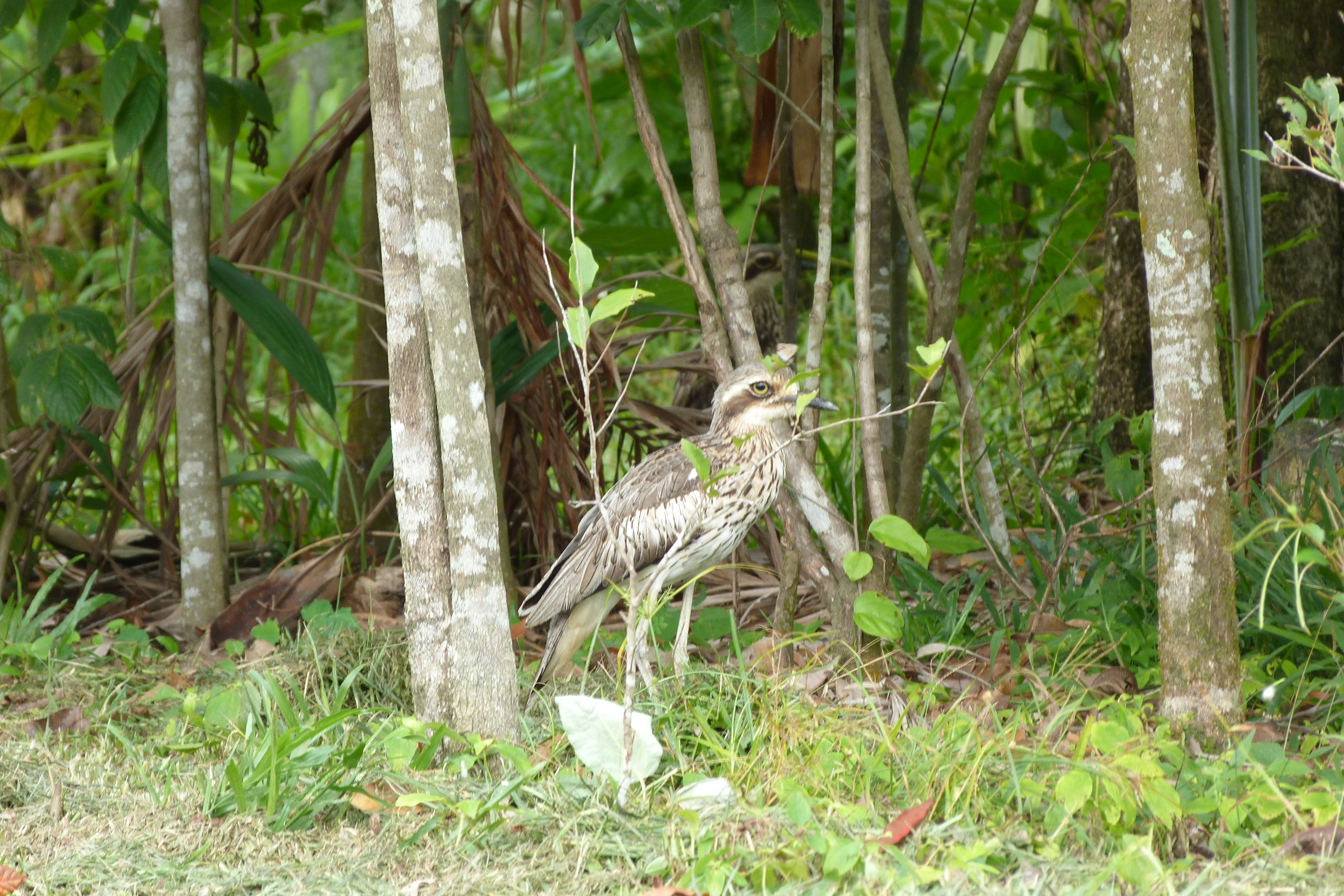
- Bush stone-curlew at Garners Beach, 2011

- Interactive map of Garners Beach
- Coordinates: 17.8158°S 146.0974°E
- Country: Australia
- State: Queensland
- LGA: Cassowary Coast Region
- Location: 12.4 km (7.7 mi) E of El Arish; 29.4 km (18.3 mi) NE of Tully; 47.9 km (29.8 mi) SSE of Innisfail; 135 km (84 mi) S of Cairns; 1,576 km (979 mi) NNW of Brisbane

Government
  - State electorate: Hill
  - Federal division: Kennedy

Area
  - Total: 2.9 km^{2} (1.1 sq mi)

Population
  - Total: 31 (2021 census)
  - Density: 10.7/km^{2} (27.7/sq mi)
- Time zone: UTC+10:00 (AEST)
- Postcode: 4852
Suburbs around Garners Beach
Midgeree Bar	Kurrimine Beach	Kurrimine Beach
Midgeree Bar	Garners Beach	Coral Sea
Bingil Bay	Bingil Bay	Coral Sea

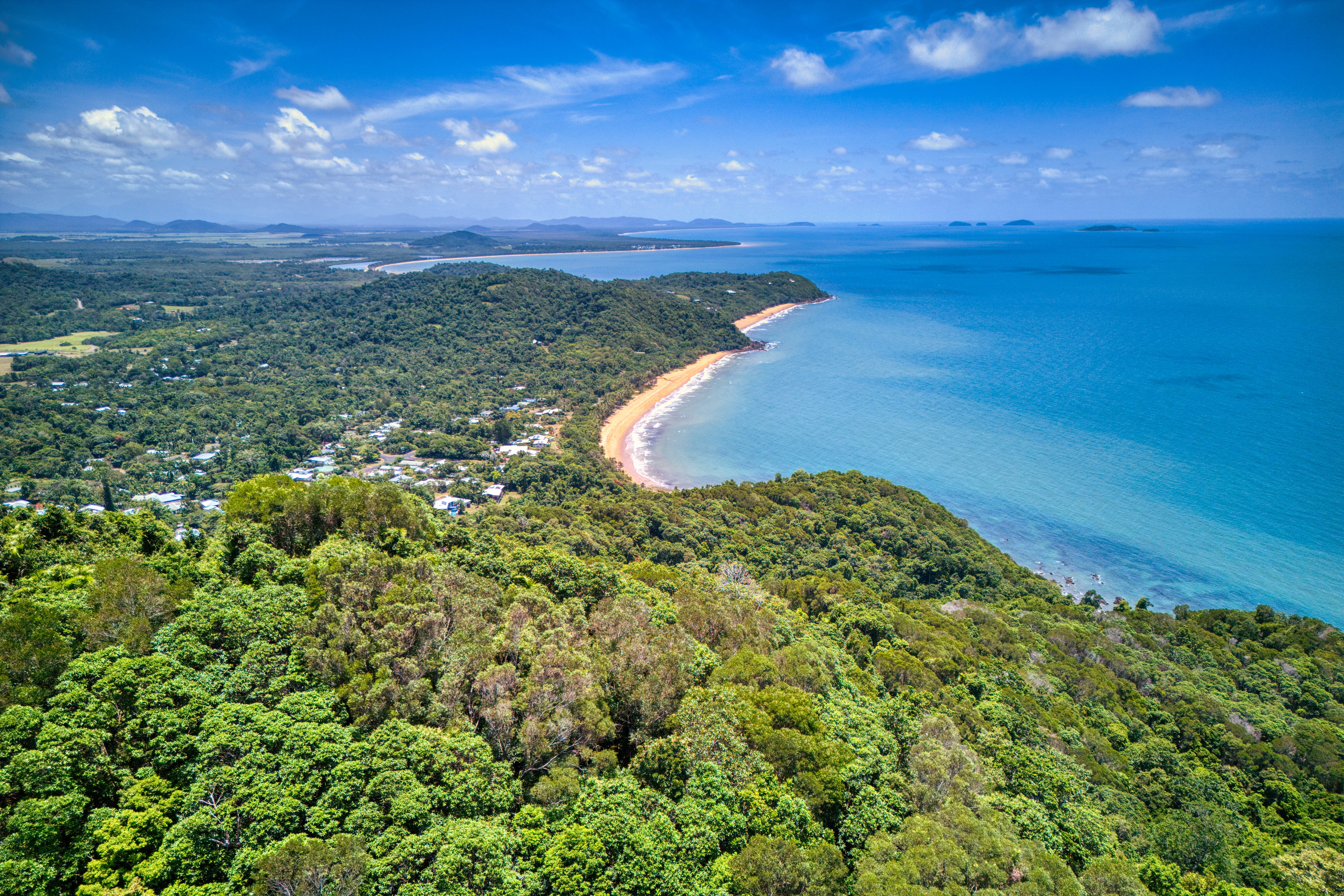
Garners Beach area - view from Bicton Hill lookout

Garners Beach is a coastal locality in the Cassowary Coast Region, Queensland, Australia. In the 2021 census, Garners Beach had a population of 31 people.

== Geography ==
The Coral Sea forms the eastern boundary and part of the northern boundary.

Garners Beach has the following beaches (from north to south):

- Garners Beach (17.8104°S 146.0989°E)
- Brookes Beach (17.8217°S 146.1032°E), extending south into Bingil Bay

== History ==
The suburb presumably takes its name from the beach, which in turn was named after pioneer settler Edward Garner who took up land there in 1890. He grew bananas and later established a refreshment room for visitors.

In 1928, Mr Garner's Beach was described as an excellent place for fishing and viewing coral.

By September 1937, Garners Beach Road had been was built to access the beach, leading to increased use by motor cars. It also facilitated a motor launch service to Garners Beach to link with a motor lorry service to El Arish for deliveries.

During World War II, the district was used as a practice firing range by the military.

== Demographics ==
In the 2016 census, Garners Beach had a population of 25 people.

In the 2021 census, Garners Beach had a population of 31 people.

== Heritage listings ==
Garners Beach has the following heritage sites:

- Garners Beach Road (17.8137°S 146.1016°E): Garners Beach Burial Ground

== Education ==
There are no schools in Garners Beach. The nearest government primary school is El Arish State School in El Arish to the west. The nearest government secondary school is Tully State High School in Tully to the south-west.
