= Djiru National Park =

National park in Queensland, Australia

- IUCN category II (national park)
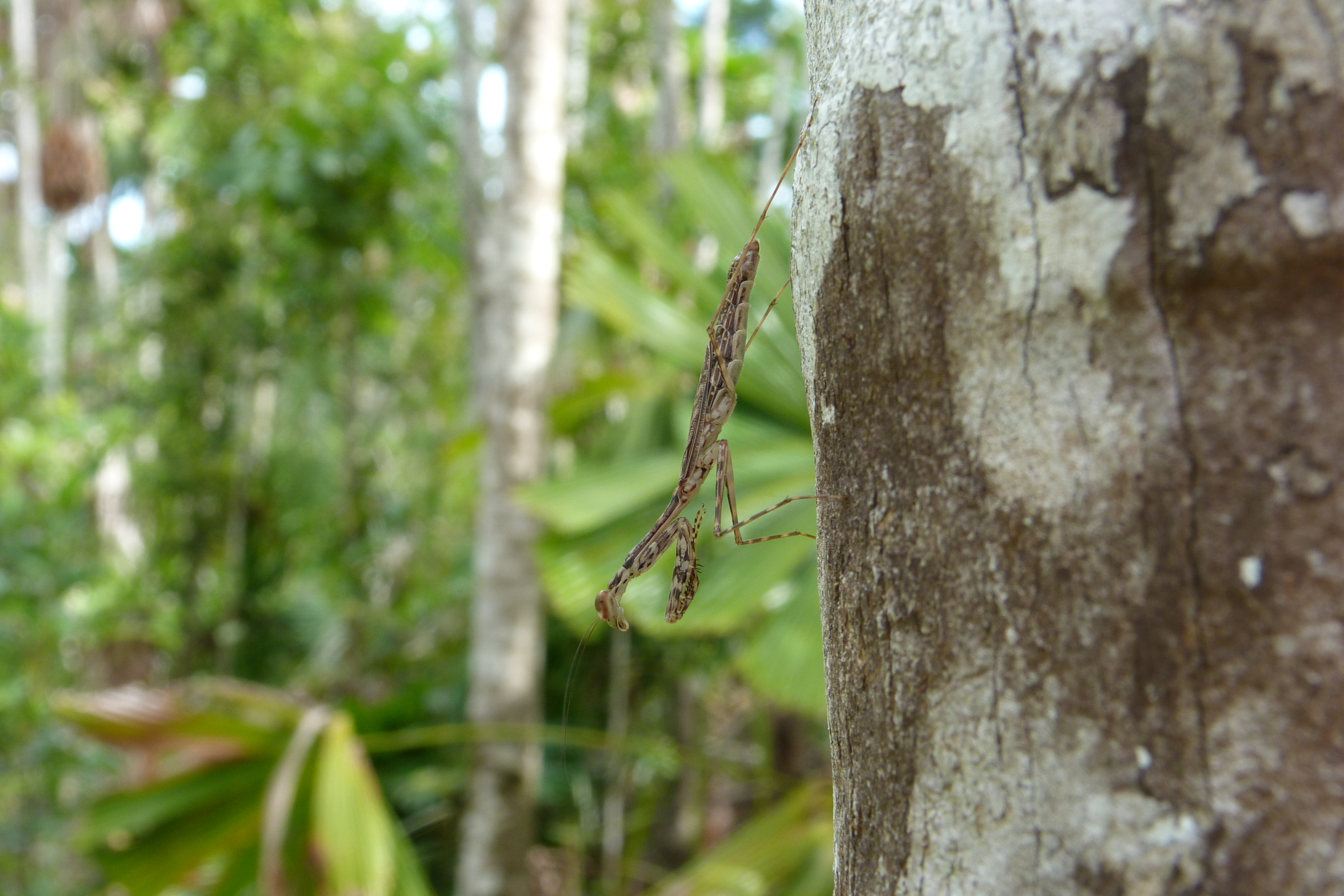
- Ciulfina (small tree-dwelling praying mantis) in Djiru National Park, 2011

- Location within Queensland
- Location: Queensland
- Nearest city: Mission Beach
- Coordinates: 17.881°S 146.067°E
- Area: 41.4 km^{2} (16.0 sq mi)
- Established: 2005
- Governing body: Queensland Parks and Wildlife Service

Djiru National Park is a protected area in the Cassowary Coast Region, Queensland, Australia. It is within the world-heritage-listed Wet Tropics of Queensland.

== Geography ==
The national park is 8 kilometres (5.0 mi) west of Mission Beach. It extends across the localities of Djiru and Tam O'Shanter.

== History ==
Originally a state forest, this area became Tam O'Shanter National Park in December 2005. On 9 December 2009, it was renamed Djiru National Park.

== Flora and fauna ==
A number of rare or vulnerable species of palm are in the national park, including the native fan palm Licuala ramsayi and arenga palm Arenga australasica.

There are also rare and endangered animal species in the park, including the southern cassowary Casuarius casuarius johnsonii.

== See also ==
- Protected areas of Queensland
