= Mission Beach, Queensland =

Mission Beach
- Town
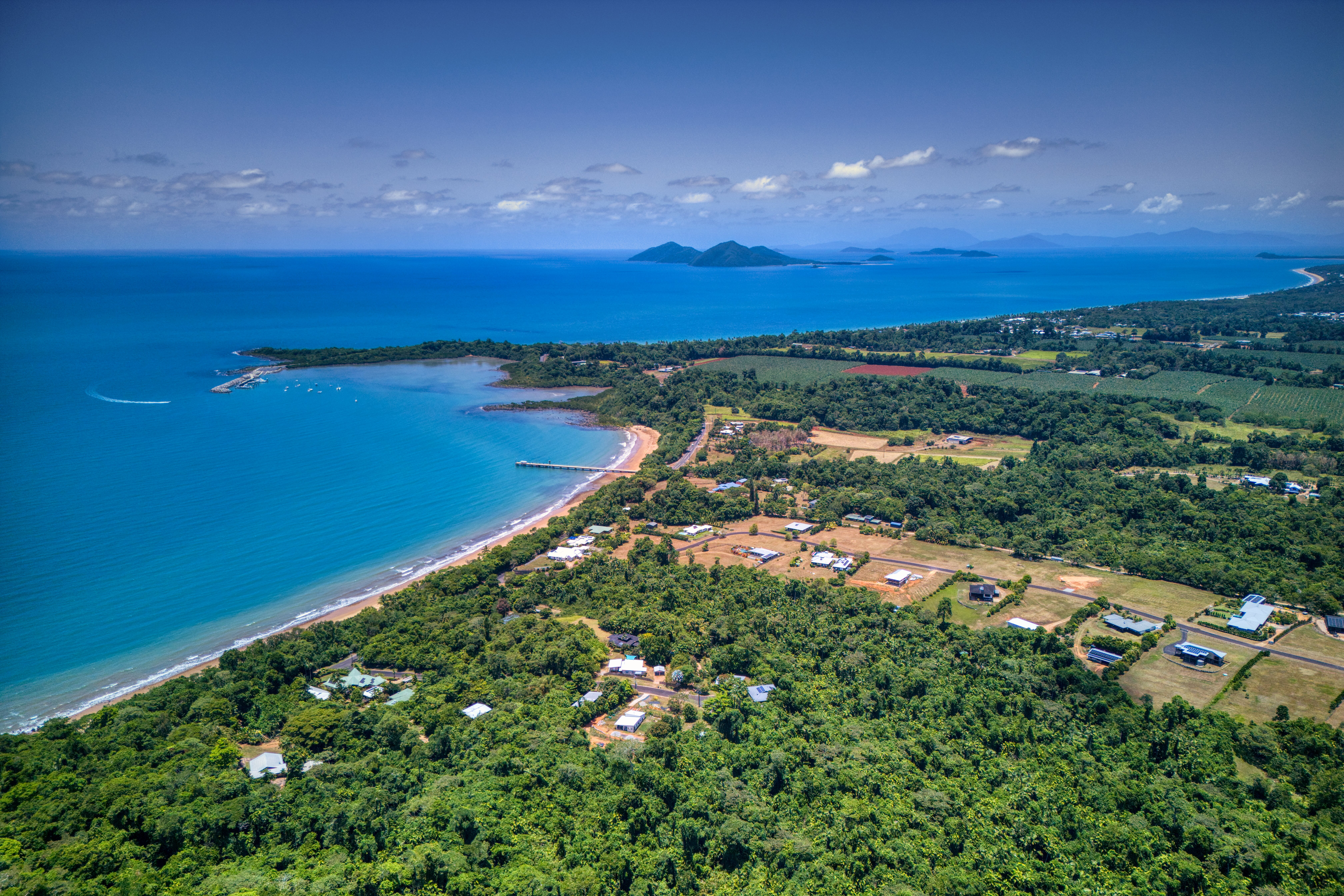
- Mission Beach

- Interactive map of Mission Beach
- Coordinates: 17.8677°S 146.1075°E
- Country: Australia
- State: Queensland
- LGA: Cassowary Coast Region
- Location: 28.5 km (17.7 mi) NE of Tully; 51.6 km (32.1 mi) S of Innisfail; 139 km (86 mi) SSE of Cairns; 235 km (146 mi) NNW of Townsville; 1,566 km (973 mi) NNW of Brisbane
- Established: 1914

Government
  - State electorate: Hill
  - Federal division: Kennedy

Area
  - Total: 13.6 km^{2} (5.3 sq mi)
- Elevation: 10 m (33 ft)

Population
  - Total: 1,014 (2021 census)
  - Density: 74.56/km^{2} (193.1/sq mi)
- Time zone: UTC+10:00 (AEST)
- Postcode: 4852
Localities around Mission Beach
Djiru	Djiru	Coral Sea
Djiru	Mission Beach	Coral Sea
Wongaling Beach	Wongaling Beach	Coral Sea

Mission Beach is a coastal town and locality in the Cassowary Coast Region, Queensland, Australia. In the 2021 census, the locality of Mission Beach had a population of 1,014 people.

== Geography ==
Mission Beach is bounded on the east by the Coral Sea.

Clump Point (17.8558°S 146.1200°E) is the northern end of a sandy beach 13 kilometres (8.1 mi) long facing the Coral Sea which runs south to Tam O'Shanter Point in South Mission Beach at the southern end.

== History ==
=== Djiru ===
The region has been inhabited for at least the past 5,000 years by a rainforest dwelling people collectively known as the Djiru people. Remains of middens, fish traps, rock-shelter paintings and ceremonial sites are located around Mission Beach and Dunk Island. Djiru people made large wooden swords and built wet-season villages consisting of dome-shaped huts thatched with palm fronds and paperbark.

=== British exploration ===
Lieutenant James Cook sailed through the area in 1770, naming Dunk Island. Clump Point was descriptively named in 1848 by Captain Owen Stanley of the Royal Navy survey ship HMS Rattlesnake. On board was the Cape York Peninsula exploration party led by Edmund Kennedy which was landed to the south of the region to begin their ill-fated overland journey. After the disembarkation of Kennedy's group, Captain Stanley anchored off Dunk Island and he and his crew remained in the vicinity for ten days. They traded with the local Djiru people until a crew member shot at them after being prevented from entering a nearby village.

=== The shipwreck of the Maria ===
On 26 February 1872, the brig Maria carrying 75 people of a gold prospecting expedition to New Guinea was wrecked upon Bramble Reef. The survivors escaped the sinking ship on 3 boats and 2 rafts. Two of the boats made it safely to the nearest British settlement of Cardwell, but the other three craft were washed up on the shoreline at and around what is now Mission Beach. Up to ten of these crew members, including the captain, were found to have been murdered by Aboriginal people residing in this region. Lieutenant Sabben of the Royal Navy was sent to recover the captain's boat and find any survivors. Upon reaching the beached boat they were attacked by about 120 Aboriginal men. In resisting the attack, 8 native people were killed. Fearing further attacks, Magistrate Brinsley Sheridan, ordered Sub-Inspector Robert Arthur Johnstone of the Native Police "to inflict decisive punishment". Johnstone and his troopers were significantly aided by another Royal Navy officer in Captain John Moresby who provided additional armed marines and a large schooner. Moresby described how "several unfortunate blacks were shot down by the native troopers, who showed an unrestrained ferocity that disgusted our officers". A six-year-old boy was taken during this raid and sent to England by the "kind act" of Lieutenant Francis Hayter. The boy died there from pneumonia three years later.

Johnstone and his troopers, together with armed sailors and volunteer riflemen, scoured the coast from Cardwell north to Cooper Point, searching every Aboriginal camp they came across for any traces of the men. Newspapers reported that Johnstone's detachment of Native Police killed a total of 93 local Aboriginal people in the Maria reprisals. Accusations of Johnstone and others having "punished the innocent together with the guilty" and partaking in "slaughtering whole camps, not only of men, but of women and children" even reached the Permanent Under-Secretary of State for the Colonies in London, Robert Herbert. The claims were dismissed by Lord Normanby, Governor of Queensland, on the grounds that the Aboriginal people of the north "are numerous, savage, treacherous, and very commonly cannibals".

Various localities around Mission Beach were named after entities and events involved in the shipwreck of the Maria including Maria Creek and the Johnstone River.

=== British settlement ===
Up until the late 1870s, the area was still considered too dangerous for British settlement and the Djiru were able to maintain their traditional livelihood in a landscape that had the "appearance of some wealthy nobleman's estate." Charles Freshney's logging company started to cut down the groves of cedar trees around Clump Point from 1880. They employed Aboriginal people for timber hauling, paying them with tobacco and tools.

The first white settlers to establish a landholding in the region were the Cutten brothers (Herbert, Leonard, James and Sidney), who took up their selections in 1886. They built a homestead which they called Bicton (now Bingil Bay), and farmed mangoes, bananas, pineapples, coffee, citrus fruit and coconuts. By 1890, the Cutten brothers were not able to support the remaining Djiru living on what was now their property. The Cuttens threatened to exterminate the Djiru and burnt down their main camp, but kept around 40 people to labour on their plantations. Initially these workers were indentured on government wages but by 1910 the Cuttens were accused of paying their remaining Djiru labourers with rum. The Cuttens starting selling out of the area in 1918 after a cyclone destroyed their plantations. After the Cutten brothers, the Unsworths settled at Narragon Beach, the Garners came and settled at Garners Beach, and the Porter brothers settled at what the locals refer to as Porter's Creek (also called Wongaling Creek) at the south end of North Mission Beach.

=== Hull River Aboriginal Settlement ===
In the early 20th century Chinese banana farmers used Aboriginal people as labourers in the Tully River region. Opium addiction and conflict with British settlers resulted in the Queensland government creating an Aboriginal internment centre, the Hull River Aboriginal Settlement, at the present South Mission Beach. John Martin Kenny was appointed superintendent in September 1914. There was no mission in the religious sense; the settlement had characteristics of a penal settlement. Forced removals from other regions swelled the population to around 500 by 1916. Many ran away and about 200 people died there in 1917 during an epidemic.

On 10 March 1918, a category 5 cyclone hit the Innisfail area, killing at least 100 people in the region. A storm surge in the Mission Beach area swept hundreds of metres inland leaving debris 7m up in some trees. This cyclone destroyed the Hull River Aboriginal Settlement, killing the superintendent Kenny, his daughter and other residents. The surviving residents were forcibly moved to a new settlement on Great Palm Island.

=== Development of the town ===
In the late 1920s after the construction of a road from El Arish, the area became a popular camping place. It was known as Mission Beach due to the mistaken belief that the Hull River Aboriginal Settlement previously located in the region was a religious mission. Mission Beach developed into a town during the 1940s and 50s with the Mission Beach Post Office opening on 15 December 1949.

Mission Beach State School opened on 27 January 1953 in the "tropical jungle" of Mission Beach. On 1 February 1993, the school re-opened at a new site in Wongaling Beach to the south.

On 20 March 2006, Cyclone Larry crossed the coast in between Mission Beach and Innisfail. In addition to structural damage to property, Cyclone Larry also had a tremendous impact on the rainforest and animals of the region. A shortage of rainforest fruit saw cassowaries seeking food in built up areas and, unfortunately, a number were hit and killed by cars.

On 3 February 2011, the eyewall of Severe Tropical Cyclone Yasi crossed the coast near Mission Beach. Wind gusts estimated up to 310 km/h (190 mph), leaving behind significant damage. A storm surge estimated to have reached 7 m (23 ft) destroyed several structures along the coast and pushed up to 300 m (980 ft) inland. Most of the beach had lost its sand and all of the towns structures were damaged to some degree, with many houses completely destroyed. There were no reports of fatalities or injuries in Mission Beach.

In 2019, Mayfair 101, an Australian-based investment consortium, bought 200 properties in Mission Beach as well as nearby Dunk Island with the view to transform the area into a "tourism mecca". By August 2020, Dunk Island had been repossessed by the former owners, and investigations by the Australian Securities and Investments Commission led to the freezing of assets of 14 property trusts Mayfair 101 had used to buy land in and around Mission Beach.

== Demographics ==
In the 2016 census, the locality of Mission Beach had a population of 815 people.

In the 2021 census, the locality of Mission Beach had a population of 1,014 people.

== Economy ==
The Mission Beach area also supports a sizeable agricultural industry, particularly the cultivation of sugar cane and bananas.

== Education ==
There are no schools in Mission Beach. The nearest government primary school is Mission Beach State School in Webb Road, Wongaling Beach. The nearest government secondary school is Tully State High School in Tully to the south-west.

== Amenities ==
Mission Beach Uniting Church is at 2224 Tully Mission Beach Road (17.8769°S 146.0921°E). It is part of the Cassowary Coast Uniting Church.

The Mission Beach Barracudas football club fields teams that play in the local Johnstone River Football Association league.

== Events ==
In September, Mission Beach hosts the annual Cassowary Festival. This festival was created to promote the unique wildlife of the region and to celebrate the community through music, activities and education. The town also formerly celebrated the annual aquatic festival; it has been discontinued since 2017.

== Tourism ==
The beach is flanked by green mountains rising just a short distance inland, and provides views out to the Family Islands. Close to shore at Mission Beach lies a shallow reef; during very low tides portions of this reef are exposed. The reef runs from the mouth of Porter's Creek at the south end of North Mission Beach almost to Clump Point, and is a popular fishing spot.

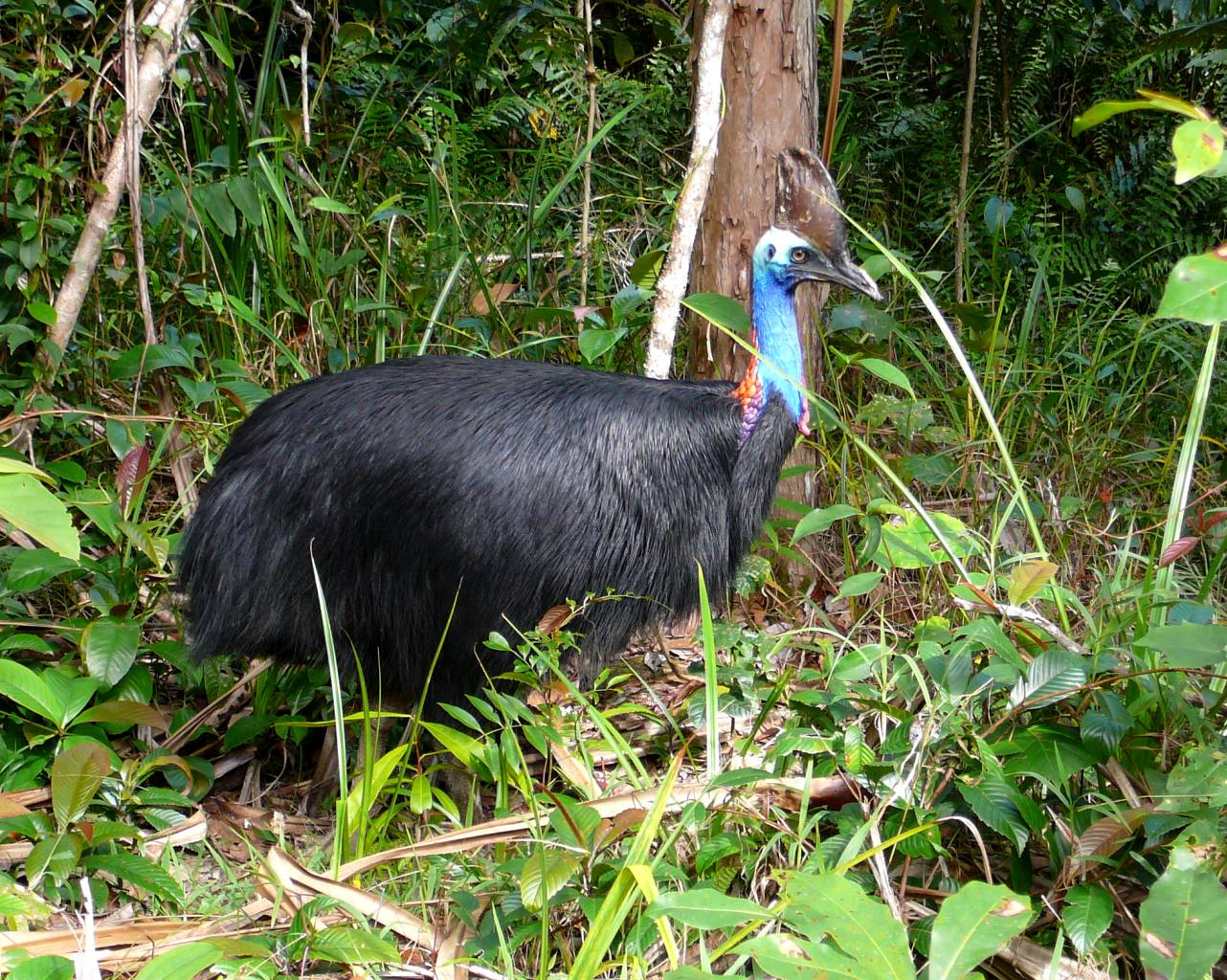
Southern cassowary

Surrounded by World Heritage rainforest on one side and the World Heritage listed Great Barrier Reef on the other, Mission Beach is home to many wildlife species, most notable is the cassowary. This large flightless bird can be found in the rainforest surrounding the area but appears to be thriving in spite of land clearing, traffic and predators such as wild dogs and feral pigs. Much of the area is part of the Coastal Wet Tropics Important Bird Area, identified as such by BirdLife International because of its importance for the conservation of lowland tropical rainforest birds.

Mission Beach is also the mainland gateway to Dunk Island, with water-taxis shuttling day-trippers out to the island.

== In popular culture ==
- In Episode 7, Season One of The Real Housewives of Melbourne, the Housewives stayed at a five-star resort in Mission Beach.
- Series 2 and 3 of Escape from Scorpion Island was filmed at Mission Beach.
- The Australian television series Sea Patrol has filmed five of its series in the waters off the Mission Beach area.
- The 2022 Netflix series Irreverent was filmed in and around Mission Beach and its church.
