= John Martin Kenny =

John Martin Kenny was a superintendent during the Queensland Aborigine Protection era. He arrived at Hull River on 1 September 1914 and established the Hull River Aboriginal Settlement.

His mother was Catherine Kenny (nee Brown).

He, and his daughter Kathleen, died on 10 March 1918 as a result of flying debris from a massive cyclone that devastated the Mission. As a result, all survivors were relocated to Palm Island.
