= Hull River National Park =

National park in Queensland, Australia

- IUCN category II (national park)
- Location within Queensland
- Location: Queensland
- Nearest city: Tully
- Coordinates: 17°57′22″S 146°04′11″E
- Area: 30.7 km^{2} (11.9 sq mi)
- Established: 1968
- Governing body: Queensland Parks and Wildlife Service

Hull River is a national park in Queensland (Australia), 1275 km northwest of Brisbane. GIS mapping data from Queensland Department of Natural Resources (2002) showed an area of 3,240 hectares, of which about 2,100 hectares are estuarine mangroves, with the remainder being swamp forests dominated by Melaleuca and specialist Eucalypt species. Rainfall averages 3,600 mm per year. The park is part of the Coastal Wet Tropics Important Bird Area, identified as such by BirdLife International because of its importance for the conservation of lowland tropical rainforest birds.

The former Hull River Aboriginal Settlement was located in this park.

Hull River is a habitat for 267 species of animals and 522 species of plants. The average elevation of the terrain is 32 metres.

== See also ==
- Protected areas of Queensland
