= Wongaling Beach, Queensland =

Wongaling Beach
- Town
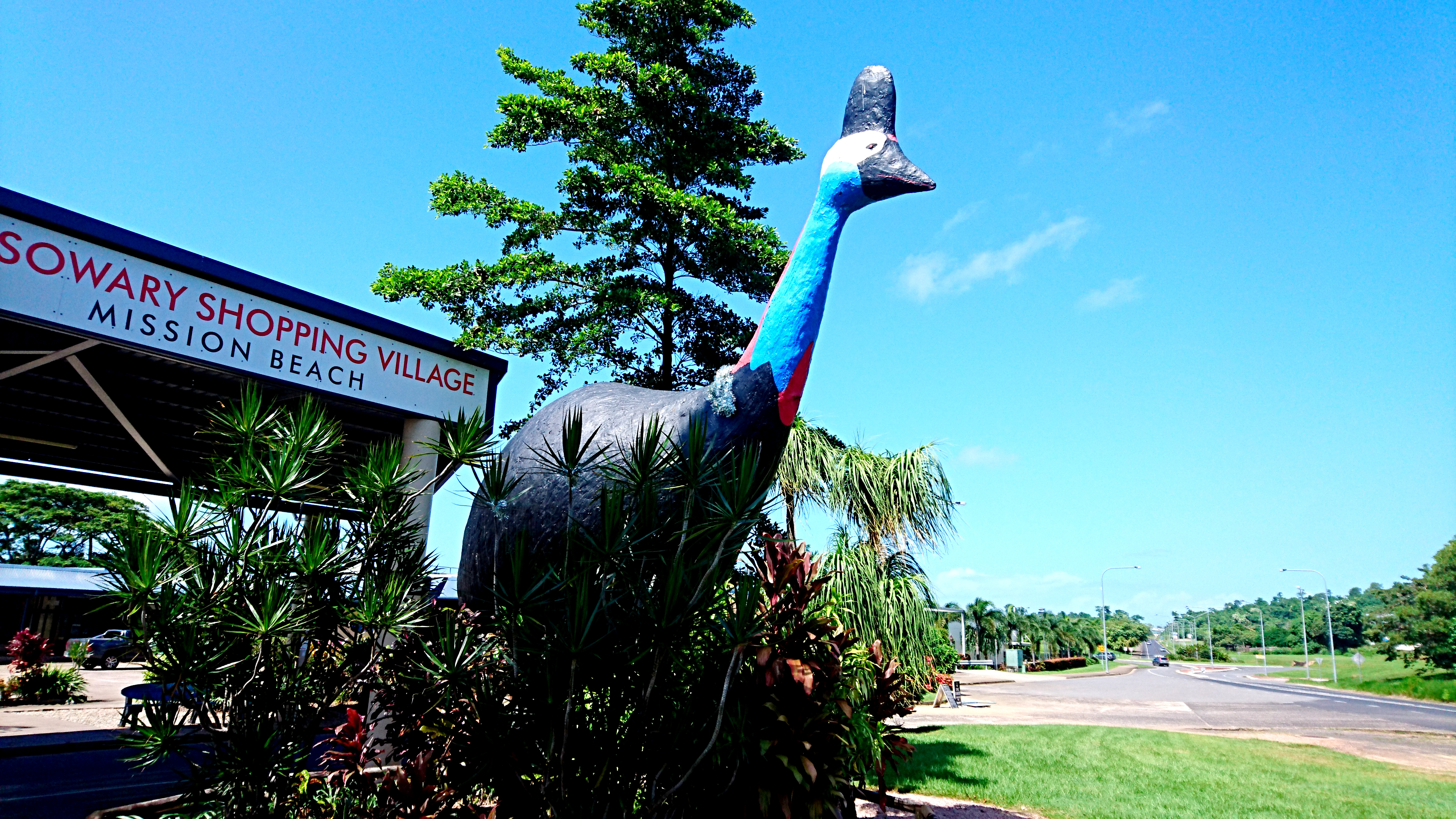
- The Big Cassowary

- Interactive map of Wongaling Beach
- Coordinates: 17.9145°S 146.0972°E
- Country: Australia
- State: Queensland
- LGA: Cassowary Coast Region
- Location: 23.8 km (14.8 mi) ENE of Tully; 52.9 km (32.9 mi) S of Innisfail; 140 km (87 mi) S of Cairns; 230 km (140 mi) NW of Townsville; 1,561 km (970 mi) NNW of Brisbane
- Established: 1973

Government
  - State electorate: Hill
  - Federal division: Kennedy

Area
  - Total: 14.6 km^{2} (5.6 sq mi)
- Elevation: 10.3 m (34 ft)

Population
  - Total: 1,323 (2021 census)
  - Density: 90.6/km^{2} (234.7/sq mi)
- Time zone: UTC+10:00 (AEST)
- Postcode: 4852
- Mean max temp: 28.1 °C (82.6 °F)
- Mean min temp: 19.2 °C (66.6 °F)
- Annual rainfall: 3,283.8 mm (129.28 in)
Localities around Wongaling Beach
Djiru	Mission Beach	Coral Sea
Tam O'Shanter	Wongaling Beach	Coral Sea
South Mission Beach	South Mission Beach	Dunk

Wongaling Beach is a tropical beachside coastal town and locality in the Cassowary Coast Region, Queensland, Australia. In the 2021 census, the locality of Wongaling Beach had a population of 1,323 people.

== Geography ==
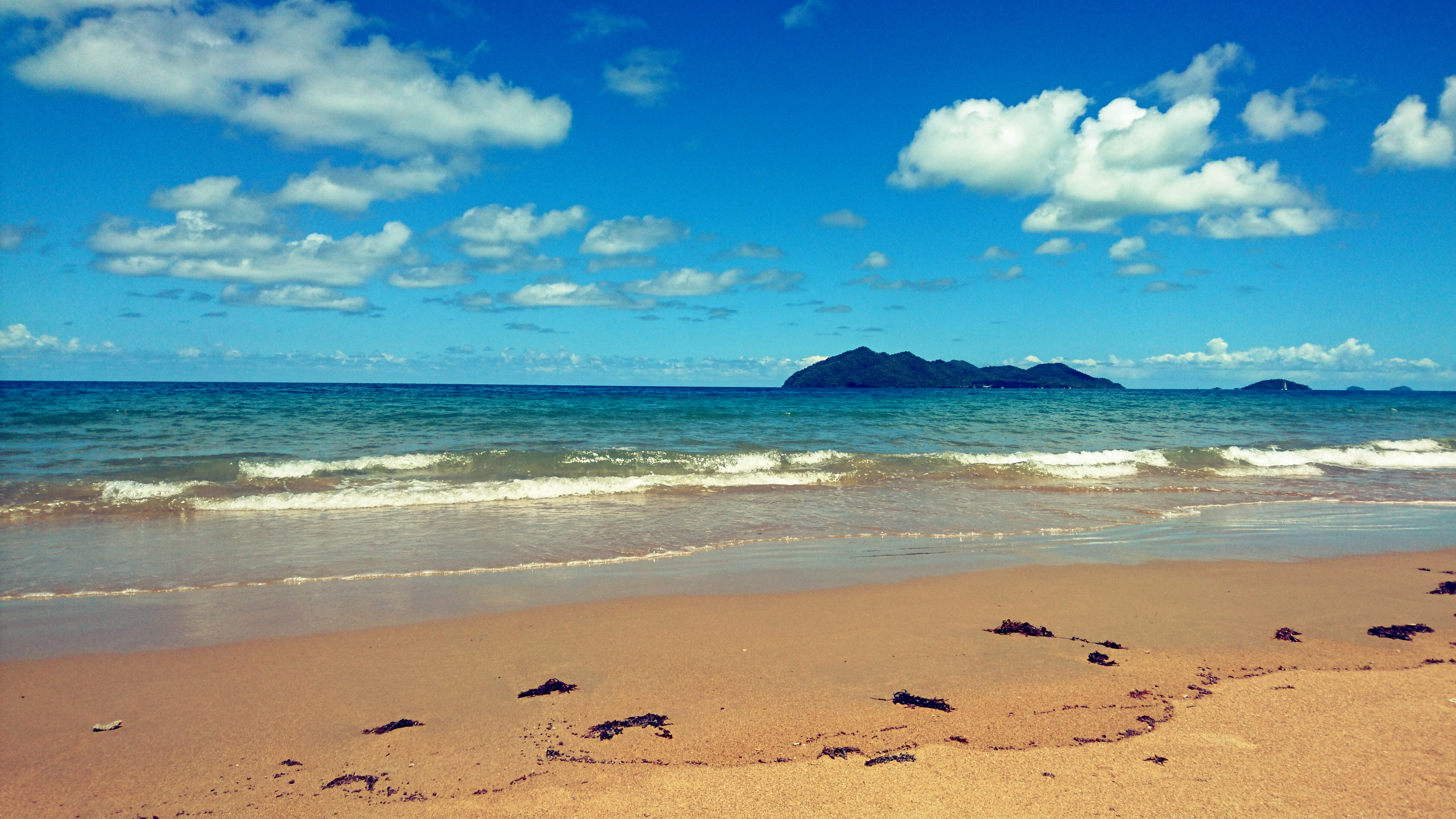
Wongaling Beach with Dunk Island in the distance, 2007

The locality takes its name from the beach Wongaling Beach (17.9039°S 146.0974°E) which extends the length of the locality's coastline, and is part of a continuous 11-kilometre (6.8 mi) sandy coastline which links the three adjacent coastal localities (from north to south): Mission Beach (sometimes called North Mission Beach), Wongaling Beach, and South Mission Beach.

Most of the residential development is along the eastern coastal strip of the locality with the town centre on the coast in the south-east of the locality. The western part of the locality is undeveloped tropical forests.

Dunk Island lies off the southern coast of Wongaling Beach.

== History ==
The suburb takes its name from its beach where the town allotments were surveyed in 1973. Wongaling is an Aboriginal word meaning pigeon.

Mission Beach State School opened on 27 January 1953 in the "tropical jungle" of Mission Beach to the north. On 1 February 1993, the school re-opened at a new site in Wongaling Beach.

Wongaling Beach Library facility was given a major refurbishment in 2002.

== Demographics ==
In the 2016 census, the locality of Wongaling Beach had a population of 1,245 people.

In the 2021 census, the locality of Wongaling Beach had a population of 1,323 people.

== Education ==
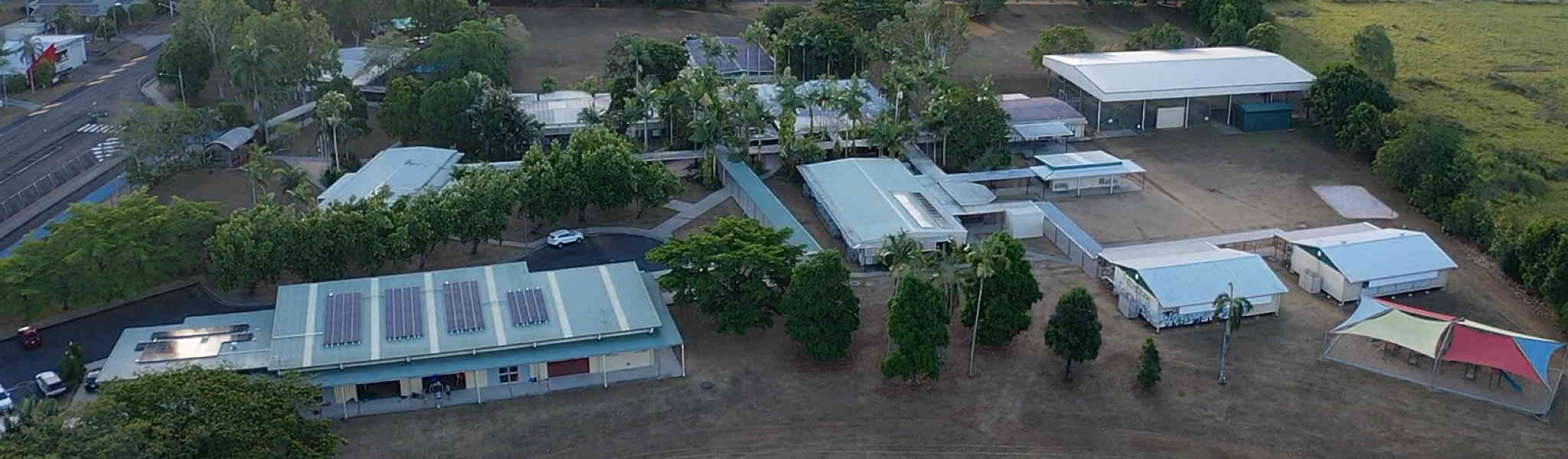
Aerial view of Mission Beach State School, 2021

Despite its name, Mission Beach State School is a government primary (Prep–6) school for boys and girls at Webb Road (17.9042°S 146.0925°E). In 2018, the school had an enrolment of 310 students with 21 teachers (20 full-time equivalent) and 19 non-teaching staff (11 full-time equivalent).

There is no secondary school in Wongaling Beach. The nearest government secondary school is Tully State High School in Tully to the south-west.

== Facilities ==
Mission Beach Police Station is at 2 Webb Street (17.9048°S 146.0918°E). Mission Beach SES Facility is at the rear of the police station (17.9050°S 146.0920°E).

Mission Beach Fire Station is at 4 Webb Street (17.9047°S 146.0922°E).

Mission Beach Ambulance Station is at 6 Webb Street (17.9048°S 146.0926°E).

Mission Beach Community Health Centre is at 26 Wongaling Beach Road (17.8959°S 146.0933°E). It operates three days a week. At other times, the nearest health services are in Tully.

== Amenities ==
Cassowary Coast Regional Council operates Wongaling Beach Library at 2018 Tully Mission Beach Drive (17.8957°S 146.0913°E).

Holy Spirit Catholic Church is at 12 Webb Road (17.9050°S 146.0934°E). It is within the Tully Parish of the Roman Catholic Diocese of Cairns.

Wongaling Beach contains a Woolworths supermarket, the largest supermarket within a 42 kilometres (26 mi) radius. The suburb also features a town pool and skate park. A community funded 'Splash Pad' was also opened in August of 2018.

== Events ==
Cassowary Coast Multisports Club organise an annual 5 kilometres (3.1 mi), 10 kilometres (6.2 mi) and 21 kilometres (13 mi) run along the beach, beginning and ending in Wongaling Beach.

== Attractions ==
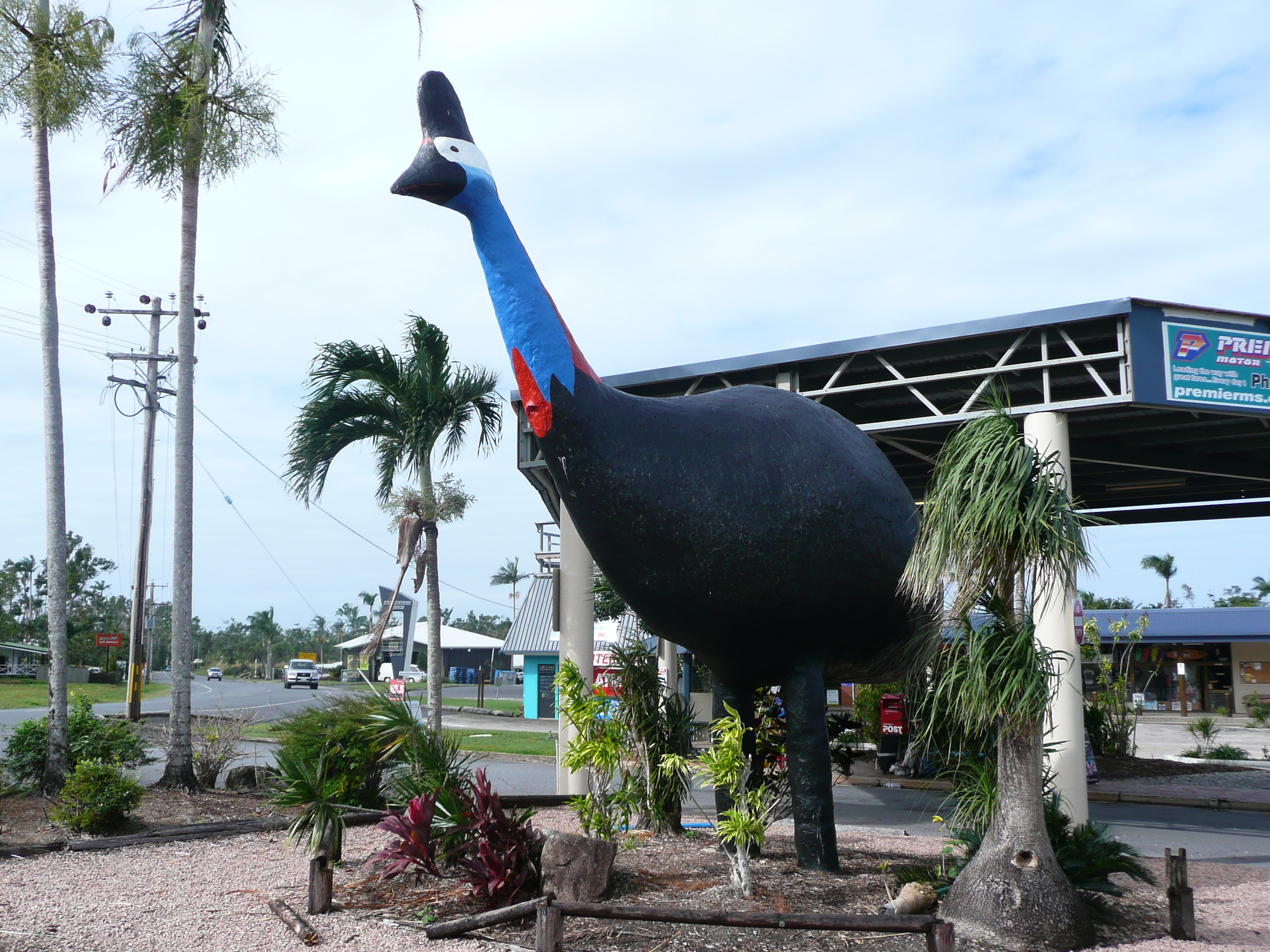
Big Cassowary, 2011

The Big Cassowary is one of Australia's big things. It is a statue of a cassowary on the south-east corner of Tully Mission Beach Road and Wongaling Beach Road (17.8975°S 146.0918°E).

== Climate ==
Wongaling Beach has a tropical climate. The nearest Bureau station with monthly weather statistics is in South Johnstone which is located 35.4 kilometres (22.0 mi) from Wongaling Beach. Under The Koppen Climate Classification, the climate is considered as ‘Af’ (Tropical Rainforest).

Climate data for South Johnstone, Queensland
Month	Jan	Feb	Mar	Apr	May	Jun	Jul	Aug	Sep	Oct	Nov	Dec	Year
Mean daily maximum °C (°F)	31.2 (88.2)	30.8 (87.4)	29.9 (85.8)	28.2 (82.8)	26.3 (79.3)	24.4 (75.9)	23.9 (75.0)	25.2 (77.4)	27.1 (80.8)	29.0 (84.2)	30.5 (86.9)	31.2 (88.2)	28.1 (82.6)
Mean daily minimum °C (°F)	22.6 (72.7)	22.8 (73.0)	22.1 (71.8)	20.5 (68.9)	18.4 (65.1)	16.0 (60.8)	15.2 (59.4)	15.5 (59.9)	16.7 (62.1)	18.8 (65.8)	20.6 (69.1)	21.8 (71.2)	19.2 (66.6)
Average precipitation mm (inches)	525.5 (20.69)	570.5 (22.46)	611.7 (24.08)	387.9 (15.27)	267.9 (10.55)	156.1 (6.15)	111.7 (4.40)	88.4 (3.48)	83.8 (3.30)	98.3 (3.87)	147.2 (5.80)	260.8 (10.27)	3,283.8 (129.28)
Average precipitation days	14.3	15.2	16.7	15.6	13.8	10.2	9.1	8.1	7.2	6.8	8.3	10.3	135.6
Source: Bureau of Meteorology
