= Tam O'Shanter Point =

Coordinates: 17°58′S 146°6′E

Tam O'Shanter Point is a headland located in South Mission Beach, Cassowary Coast Region, Queensland, Australia on the north-eastern part of Rockingham Bay in the Coral Sea. It is part of the Coastal Wet Tropics Important Bird Area, identified as such by BirdLife International because of its importance for the conservation of lowland tropical rainforest birds.

== History ==
The point was named by Captain Owen Stanley of the Royal Navy survey ship HMS Rattlesnake, after the barque Tam O'Shanter which was the ship the explorer Edmund Kennedy sailed to North Queensland on his ill-fated expedition to reach Cape York Peninsula in 1848. (Note: Tam O'Shanter, of 270 tons (bm) and homeport Liverpool, had been launched at Workington in 1836.)
