= El Arish, Queensland =

El Arish
- Town
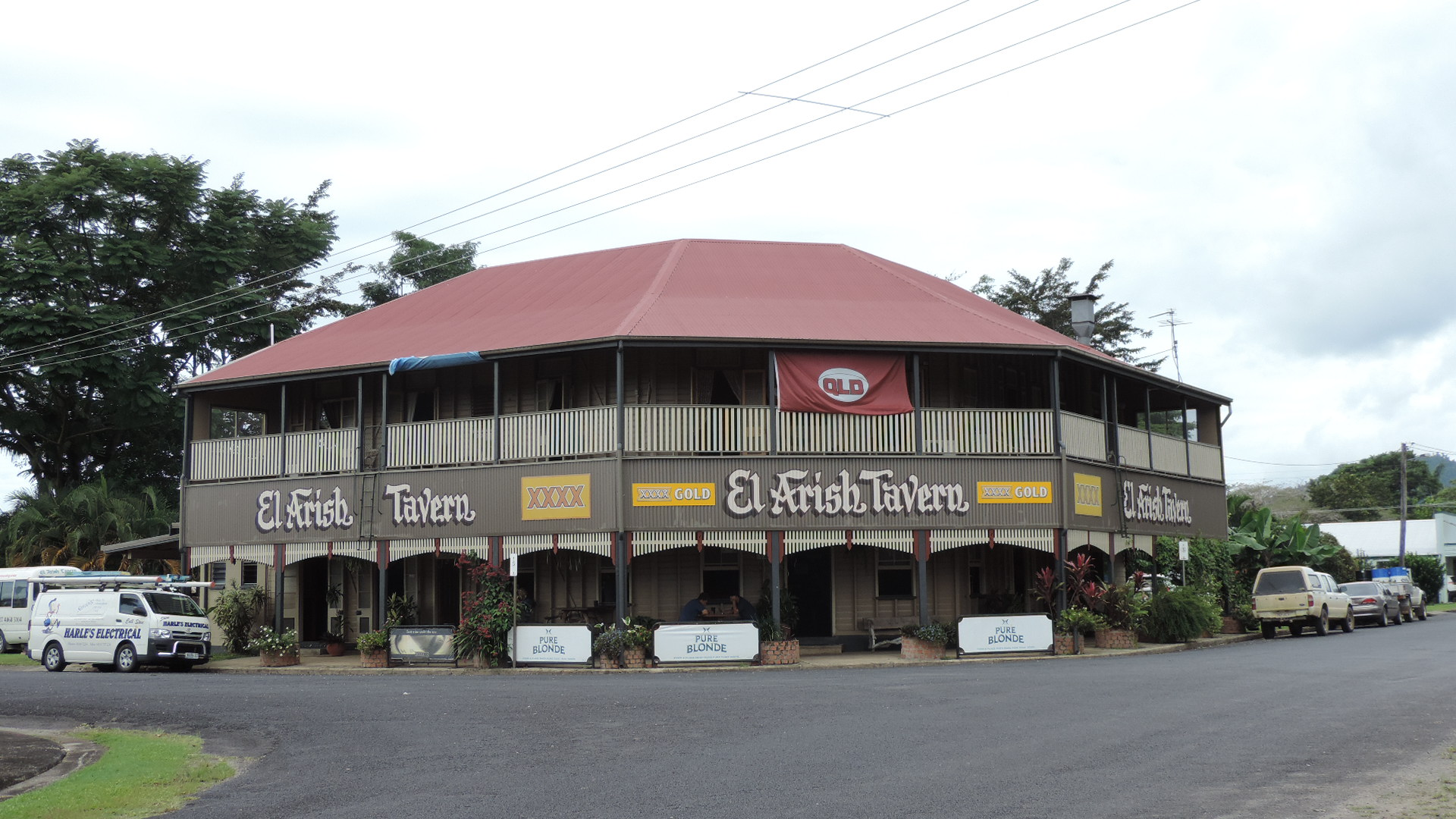
- El Arish Tavern, 2016

- Interactive map of El Arish
- Coordinates: 17.8038°S 146.0055°E
- Country: Australia
- State: Queensland
- LGA: Cassowary Coast Region
- Location: 19.1 km (11.9 mi) NE of Tully; 36.2 km (22.5 mi) S of Innisfail; 125 km (78 mi) S of Cairns; 1,560 km (970 mi) NNW of Brisbane
- Established: 1921

Government
  - State electorate: Hill
  - Federal division: Kennedy

Area
  - Total: 7.1 km^{2} (2.7 sq mi)
- Elevation: 20 m (66 ft)

Population
  - Total: 337 (2021 census)
  - Density: 47.5/km^{2} (122.9/sq mi)
- Time zone: UTC+10:00 (AEST)
- Postcode: 4855
- County: County of Nares
- Parish: Parish of Hull
- Annual rainfall: 3,648.9 mm (143.66 in)
Localities around El Arish
Jaffa	Jaffa	Daveson
Shell Pocket	El Arish	Maria Creeks
Maadi	Friday Pocket	Granadilla

El Arish is a rural town and locality in the Cassowary Coast Region, Queensland, Australia. In the 2021 census, the locality of El Arish had a population of 337 people.

== Geography ==
The Bruce Highway enters the locality from the south (Maadi / Friday Pocket) and passes immediately east of the town and exits the locality to the north-east (Daveson).

The North Coast railway line enters the locality from the south-west (Maadi), passes immediately to the west of the town and exits the locality to the north (Jaffa / Daveson). The town is served by the El Arish railway station (17.8094°S 146.0016°E) but its railway station building has now been repurposed as a museum. The now-abandoned Quatia railway station (17.7944°S 146.0056°E) served the north of the locality and is the source of the name of the Quatia neighbourhood (17.8°S 146.0000°E).

== History ==
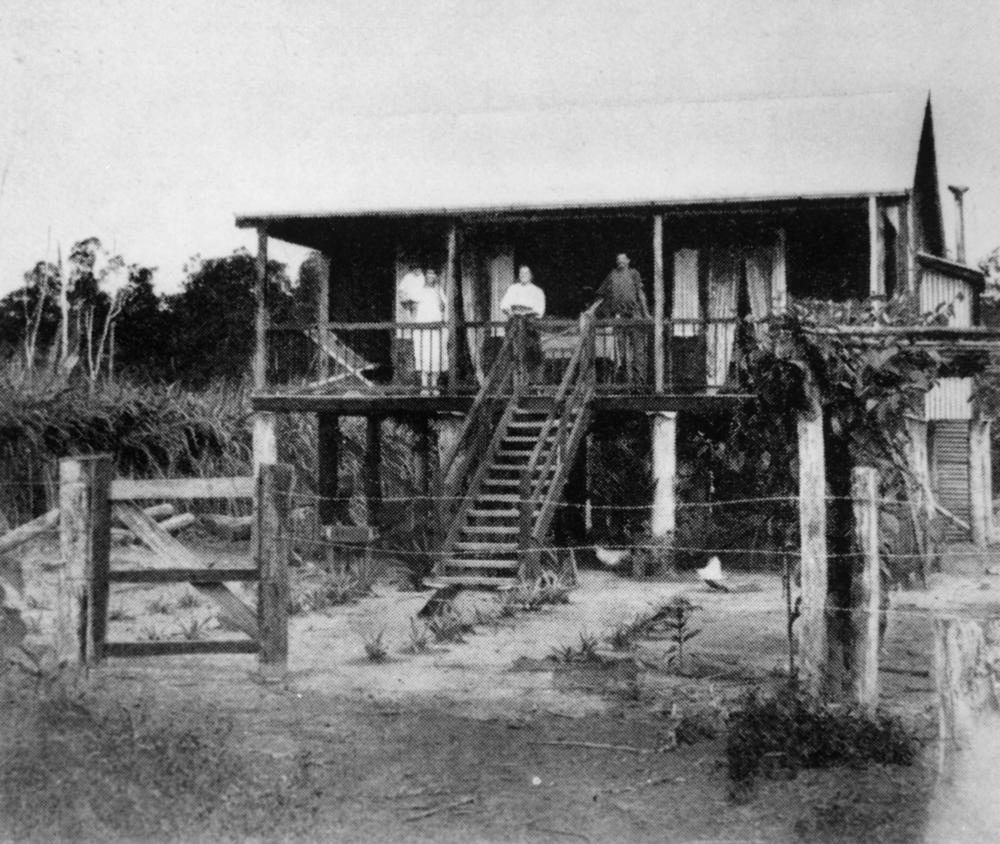
Soldier settlement home at El Arish, around 1920

The town was founded in 1921 as a soldier settlement area, and was named after the city of Arish in Egypt where the Australian Light Horse saw action in December 1916, and which was later developed as a major base area with an allied hospital. . Many of the streets were named after high-ranking officers, including:

- Chauvel Street after General Harry Chauvel
- Glasgow Street after Major General Thomas William Glasgow
- Monash Street after General John Monash
- Royston Street after Brigadier General John Royston
- Ryrie Street after Major General Granville Ryrie

Some were named after veterans, such as:

- Francis Martin Street after Francis Paxton Martin who set up some soldier settlements in El Arish in the 1920s.

On 31 August 1922, the Queensland Railways Department opened a siding called Quatia, about 1.5 kms north of El Arish. The name was suggested by soldier settlers and refers to a city in Egypt, where the Australian Imperial Force engaged in the Battle of Katia in World War I. The station at El Arish itself was opened on 18 December 1922. Having been threatened with demolition, the station building was given to the community by Queensland Rail in 1992, and was relocated and repaired.

The El Arish War Memorial is located on the south-west corner of Monash and Ryrie Streets (17.806332°S 146.004821°E). It was unveiled in September 1947.

The Maria Creek State School opened on 13 May 1922; it was renamed El Arish State School in 1925.

El Arish Post Office opened by 1926 (a receiving office had been open from 1921).

El Arish Tavern was established in 1927.

The RSL Memorial Hall opened in October 1930. It was built by local people using timber donated by the Myers sawmill.

The area was later settled by Italian Australians who worked in the sugar cane fields.

The town was hit by Severe Tropical Cyclone Yasi in February 2011.

== Demographics ==
In the 2006 census, the locality of El Arish had a population of 232 people.

In the 2011 census, the locality of El Arish had a population of 442 people.

In the 2016 census, the locality of El Arish had a population of 344 people.

In the 2021 census, the locality of El Arish had a population of 337 people.

== Heritage listings ==
Heritage-listed places in El Arish include:

- the former El Arish railway station, now the El Arish History Station, which houses a small soldier settlement and local history museum collection. A social morning tea is held in the museum almost every Friday of the year at 9am, and visitors are welcome. A donation of $2 is requested from attendees.
- the El Arish Tavern.
- the El Arish RSL Memorial Hall. The hall has been maintained by local volunteers since 1930.

== Economy ==
Today, the area is home to a large sugar cane industry and banana plantations.

== Education ==
El Arish State School is a government primary (Prep–6) school for boys and girls at 28 Chauvel Street (17.8078°S 146.0026°E). In 2018, the school had an enrolment of 37 students with 3 teachers and 6 non-teaching staff (3 full-time equivalent).

There are no secondary schools in El Arish. The nearest government secondary school is Tully State High School in Tully to the south-west.

== Facilities ==
El Arish Police Station is at 24 Ryrie Street (corner Monash Street, 17.8065°S 146.0052°E).

El Arish Fire Station is at 5–7 Ryrie Street (17.8057°S 146.0037°E). In 2020 the old buildings were replaced with a new fire station.

El Arish Post Office is at 46 Chauvel Street (17.8066°S 146.0029°E).

== Amenities ==
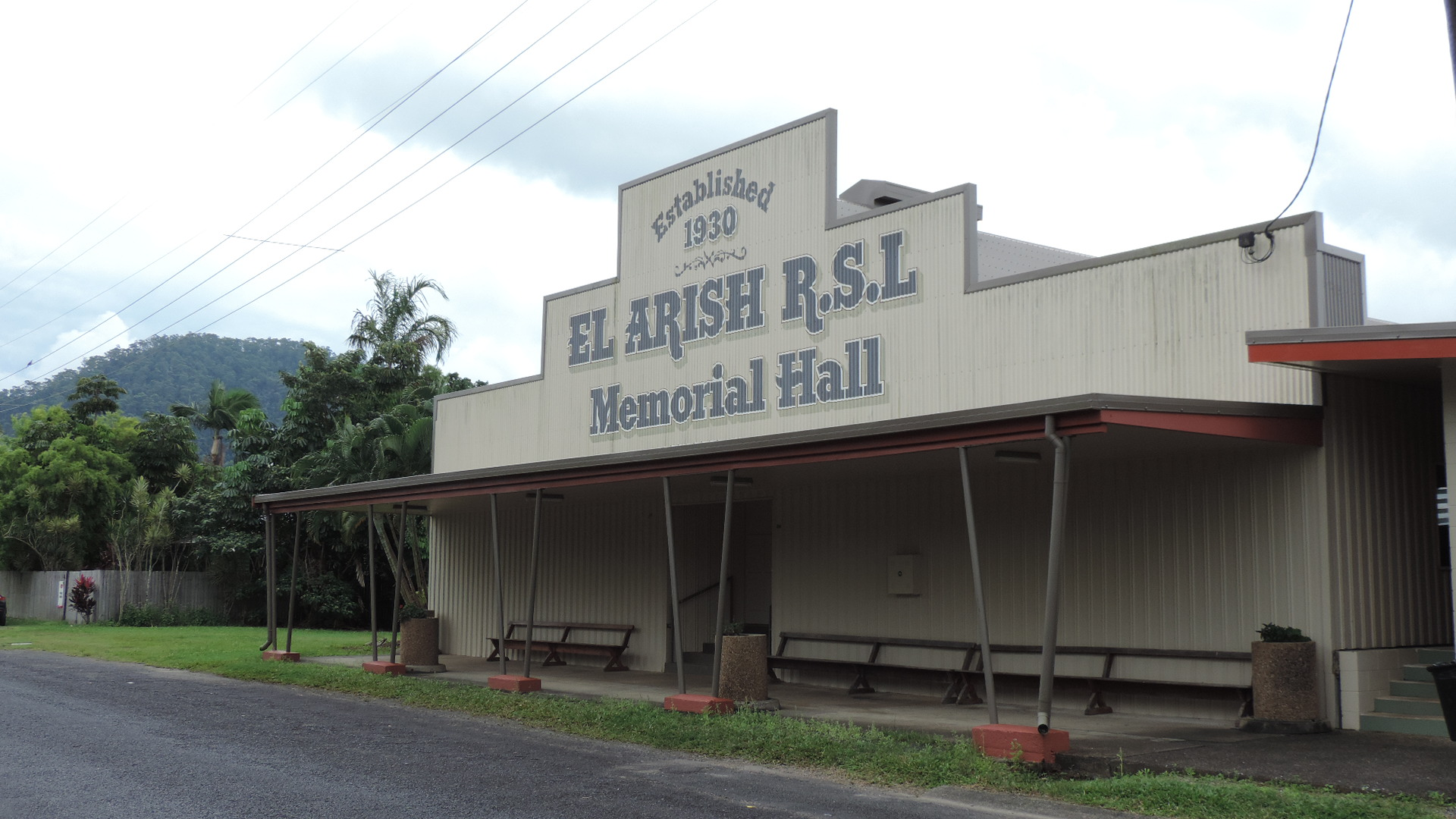
RSL Memorial Hall, 2016

The El Arish Country Golf Club has a 9-hole course and is located on Golf Course Road (17.81007°S 146.00377°E).

Our Lady of Fatima Catholic Church is at 32 Glasgow Street (17.8045°S 146.0067°E). It is within the Silkwood Parish of the Roman Catholic Diocese of Cairns.

El Arish RSL Memorial Hall is at 17 Royston Street (17.8070°S 146.0047°E). It can seat 250 people and has a dance floor, stage, kitchen and coldroom.

== Landmarks ==
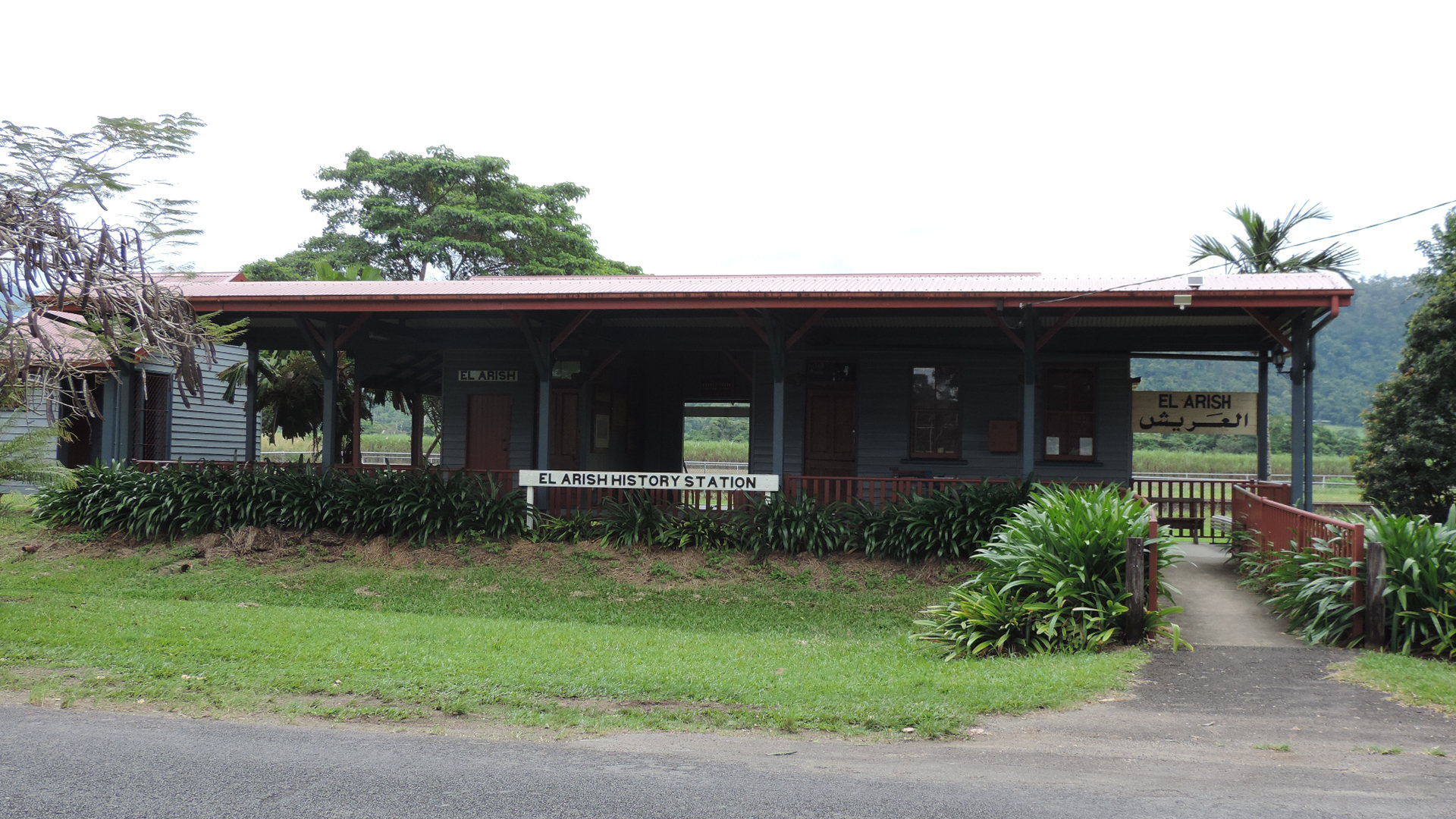
El Arish Diggers Museum, 2016

The former El Arish railway station building has been reoriented on its block in order to face Chauvel Street (17.8072°S 146.0025°E). It is used as a local history museum, and is currently known as the El Arish Diggers Museum (formerly the El Arish History Station).
