= Thorpe Island =

Island of Queensland, Australia

Geography
- Location: Northern Australia
- Coordinates: 17.9821°S 146.1369°E
- Archipelago: Family Islands

Administration
- Australia
- Queensland

Thorpe Island is one of the middle islands of the Family Islands group within the locality of Dunk in the Cassowary Coast Region, Queensland. Australia. It is also known as Timana Island. It is about 15 km east of Tully Heads.

In 1770 Captain James Cook discovered The Family Group of Islands. The largest he named "The Father Isle" and titled it Dunk Island, the second-largest he named "The Mother Isle", now Bedarra Island, and the smallest islands were the children: Timana Island the baby, the Twins and the triplets.

Thorpe Island is privately owned with one residence. It is one of only a few Australian islands that are owned freehold.
