= Peristylus banfieldii =

Yellow ogre orchid

Scientific classification
- Kingdom: Plantae
- Clade: Tracheophytes
- Clade: Angiosperms
- Clade: Monocots
- Order: Asparagales
- Family: Orchidaceae
- Subfamily: Orchidoideae
- Tribe: Orchideae
- Subtribe: Orchidinae
- Genus: Peristylus
- Species: P. banfieldii

Binomial name
- Peristylus banfieldii (F.M.Bailey) Lavarack

Synonyms
- Habenaria banfieldii F.M.Bailey

Species of orchid

Peristylus banfieldii, commonly known as yellow ogre orchid, is a species of orchid that is endemic to Tropical North Queensland. It has between four and six leaves near its base and up to fifty cup-shaped, cream-coloured to yellow flowers on a hairy flowering stem.

== Description ==
Peristylus banfieldii is a tuberous, perennial herb with between four and six leaves with wavy margins at its base. The leaves are 50–125 mm (2–5 in) long and 40–80 mm (2–3 in) wide, the largest leaves uppermost. Between fifteen and fifty cream-coloured to yellow, cup-shaped flowers about 5 mm (0.20 in) long and 6 mm (0.24 in) wide are borne on a hairy flowering stem 300–500 mm (10–20 in) tall. The dorsal sepal is about 5–7 mm (0.2–0.3 in) long and 3–4 mm (0.1–0.2 in) wide, partly forming a hood over the column. The lateral sepals are a similar size to the dorsal sepal and spread widely apart from each other. The petals are 4–5 mm (0.16–0.20 in) long and about 2 mm (0.08 in) wide and are projected forwards. The labellum is 5–8 mm (0.2–0.3 in) long, 4–7 mm (0.16–0.28 in) wide with its tip divided into three. Flowering occurs from January to March.

== Taxonomy and naming ==
Yellow ogre orchid was first formally described in 1906 by Frederick Manson Bailey from a specimen collected on Dunk Island by Edmund James Banfield and given the name Habenaria banfieldii. The description was published in the Queensland Agricultural Journal. In 1981 Bill Lavarack changed the name to Peristylus banfieldii. The specific epithet (banfieldii) honours the collector of the type specimen.

== Distribution and habitat ==
Peristylus banfieldii grows in moist places in open forest and on rainforest margins. It is found on Dunk Island, and near Mareeba and Cardwell.
