= Banfield Memorial Reserve and Grave =

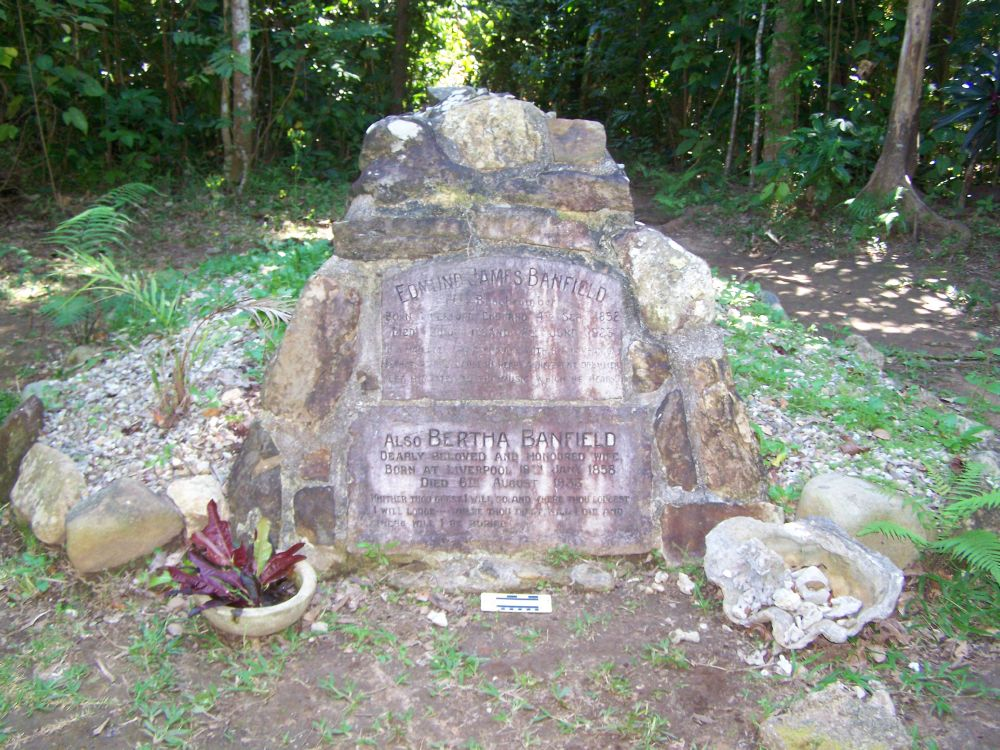
- Banfield Memorial Reserve and Grave, 2008

- Location within Queensland Location within Australia
- 17.9355°S 146.1444°E
- Location: Dunk Island, Queensland, Australia

History
- Built: 1923–1933

Queensland Heritage Register
- Official name: Banfield Memorial Reserve and Grave
- Type: state heritage (built)
- Designated: 6 August 2010
- Reference no.: 602755

Banfield Memorial Reserve and Grave is a heritage-listed lone grave at Dunk Island, Cassowary Coast Region, Queensland, Australia. It was built from 1923 to 1933. It was added to the Queensland Heritage Register on 6 August 2010.

== History ==
Situated on Dunk Island in far north Queensland, the grave was made in 1923 for the remains of the renowned author and naturalist, Edmund James (Ted) Banfield, popularly known as "The Beachcomber". The cairn erected over it soon after, and the memorial reserve established around it in 1971, honour Banfield for his set of internationally successful books about the area's native flora and fauna.

In the early twentieth century Banfield made a significant contribution to the conservation of not only Dunk Island but the entire Family Islands group, of which it is a part, situated off the coast from Mission Beach. He also popularised a particular kind of tourism in this part of the Great Barrier Reef, that would later be termed eco-tourism.

Edmund (Ted) James Banfield was born on 4 September 1852 in Liverpool, England. His family emigrated to Australia in 1858 after his father found a job printing a news-sheet on the Ararat goldfields in Victoria. Ted Banfield eventually followed his father into journalism, but his particular passions were the study of nature and reading. He was strongly influenced by the writings of Henry David Thoreau (1817–1862), an American philosopher, essayist and poet whose most famous book was Walden or Life in the Woods published in 1854 and whose best known essay was On the Duty of Civil Disobedience first published in 1849. Thoreau became well known for his ideas about living close to nature and developing self-reliance within it, as well as those pertaining to the deficiencies of state power. Banfield later credited his reading of Thoreau's work with giving him the impetus to search out new experiences.

In 1882, after working at newspapers in Melbourne, Sydney and Penrith, Banfield accepted a job as sub-editor of the Townsville Daily Bulletin. This position bought him into contact with prominent North Queensland separationists such as Robert Philp, Thomas Hollis Hopkins and Thankful Willmett. He became a passionate supporter of the separation movement and dedicated much of his own time to writing supportive editorials. In 1884 he travelled to England to seek specialist medical treatment for an eye injured in childhood. To pay for his fare with the British-India Steam Navigation Company he wrote a series, entitled "Homeward Bound", of seven articles promoting the northern sea route to England via the Torres Strait. While in England Banfield met Bertha Golding, who in 1886 emigrated to Townsville where they married.

Banfield continued his support of the north Queensland separation movement through the organisation of fund-raising functions; however during the 1890s his health deteriorated. To aid his recuperation, in 1896 the Banfields camped with friends on Dunk Island, the most northerly of the Family Islands group off Mission Beach. His renewed strength from this experience inspired him to look for a home among the Family Islands group, finally settling on Dunk Island where in September he leased a small area for 30 years at a nominal annual rental.

Diagnosed as tubercular and suffering nervous collapse, Banfield resigned from the North Queensland Newspaper Co. and he and his wife moved to the island on 28 September 1897, initially for a six-month trial. They and a manservant were the only Europeans in residence on the island; camping in tents and later clearing a small portion of land for a prefabricated hut and a plantation.

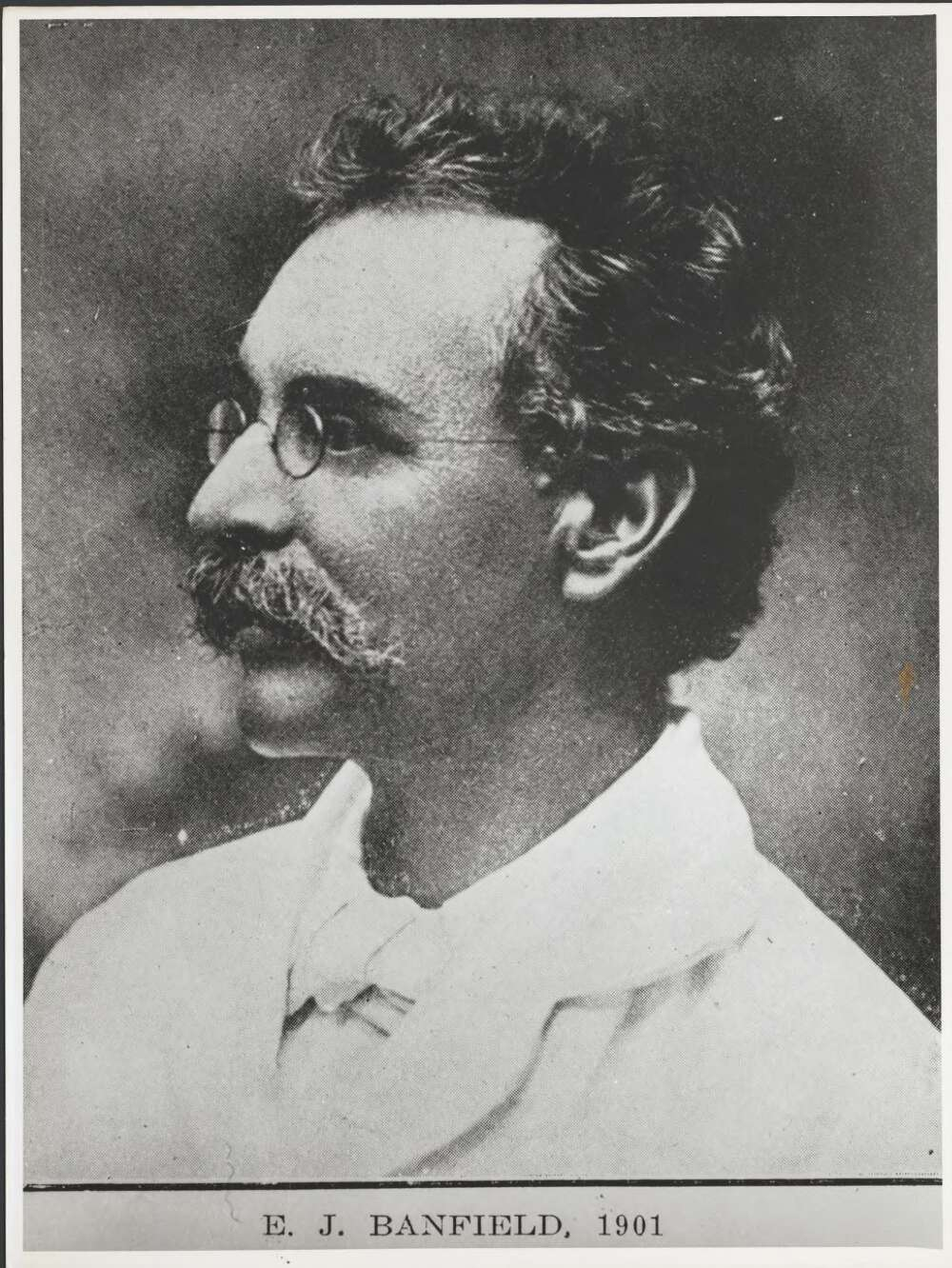
Edmund James (Ted) Banfield, 1901

With greatly improved health Banfield settled into improving the property, constructing a home using timber obtained from the Cutten Brother's timber mill at Bingil Bay on the mainland, and planting sprouting coconuts to form a long avenue of palms from the house down to the beach. On 4 January 1900 he applied for and was granted a selection of 320 acres (130 ha) on the western side of Dunk Island. When the selection was surveyed in mid-1899 improvements already comprised a house within a fenced yard, overlooking Brammo Bay to the north-west, and five other structures including a hut and fowl house. To the south of the house was a large swamp; to the north and surrounded by dense scrub there was a cleared cultivation area with coconut palms. In 1905 improvements to the property were valued at £390, and comprised: an iron-roofed, timber-clad house with wooden floors and detached kitchen with thatched roofed; a laundry clad and floored with hardwood; an iron-roofed storehouse with a hardwood frame and flooring; a stockyard; a goat and fowl shed; an extent of post and wire fencing and wire netting; 95 citrus trees; and six acres of land cleared for cultivation.

From early 1898 Banfield kept a daily record of his life on Dunk Island. He observed the rhythms of the island, paying particular attention to the indigenous flora and fauna and to the way the local Aborigines interacted with the environment. The Bandjin and Djiru people were the traditional owners of the Family Islands, and Banfield developed a close relationship with them, observing their customs and way of life, and learning from them about the island habitat. He also recorded the Aboriginal names for various features, places, flora and fauna on the island and commissioned a survey plan of the island marked with this nomenclature. His recording of these details was particularly timely, as the local Aboriginal population was removed to missions in the early twentieth century (possibly the Hull River Settlement before 1918, and then to Palm Island).

Sir Matthew Nathan, Governor of Queensland from December 1920 to September 1925, took an interest in Banfield's work on Dunk Island. Nathan had a particular interest in the study of the Great Barrier Reef, as well as local history and the origin of place names in Queensland and was involved from 1922 in the planning, organisation and financing of the British Great Barrier Reef expedition of 1928 to 1929.

Banfield began to focus on protecting distinct bird habitats and this concern for birds prompted him to write to Robert Philp, Premier of Queensland from 1899 to 1903 and from 1907 to 1908, and propose that the Family Islands be declared a sanctuary for them. He offered to support this proposal by assuming the role of Honorary Warden of the Isles to uphold the aims of the Native Birds Protection Act 1877. The islands were proclaimed a Reserve for the Protection and Preservation of Native Birds on 10 May 1905, and Banfield was gazetted as Honorary Ranger on 24 June 1905.

Banfield maintained a steady writing schedule, documenting his experiences and observations, and selling publications to supplement his meagre income. In addition to articles promoting the separation movement, he also wrote Within the Barrier: Tourist Guide to the North Queensland Coast which was commissioned by the Queensland Government and published in 1907 by Thankful Willmett and Sons. In 1908 he published Confessions of a Beachcomber which proved to be his most successful work and was translated widely. Part diary, anthropological study, natural science notebook and homage to the island, Confessions was dubbed a "classic for naturalists" by Nature magazine and Banfield became widely known as "The Beachcomber". He wrote three other books that focused on Dunk Island: My Tropic Isle; Tropic Days and Last Leaves from Dunk Island, which was published posthumously in 1925 and edited by naturalist Alexander Hugh Chisholm, publisher and author of many books on Australia's flora and fauna between 1922 and 1966. Last Leaves contained detailed observations about the impact of the devastating 1918 cyclone on the island and surrounding area. Many of the writing contained in these books had been published as articles in the Townsville Daily Bulletin, The North Queensland Register and the Queensland Geographical Journal.

At the time of his death due to appendicitis in 1923, at the age of 70, Banfield was a well known author, his passing being reported in The Argus and the Sydney Morning Herald. At the 1929 Australian Writers Festival, Chisholm noted that Banfield's work had "won a chorus of posthumous approval from every part of the world". His writings captured the imagination of artists, naturalists, recluses and tourists both in Australia and internationally – many of whom visited the island both during his lifetime (including the Australian Governor-General Ronald Munro Ferguson and his wife Lady Helen Munro Ferguson in 1920), and after his death.

Spenser McTaggart Hopkins, the son of separationist Thomas Hollis Hopkins, buried Banfield on his Dunk Island selection, on elevated ground north of the house, and erected a cairn over the grave. He also commissioned a marble tablet for the cairn, inscribed with a quote from Thoreau. Bertha Banfield lived for another ten years, spending her time between Townsville and Victoria. When she died in 1933, Spenser Hopkins placed her ashes by her husband's grave and added a second tablet to the cairn. The grave has remained intact on Dunk Island despite changing ownership and land use.

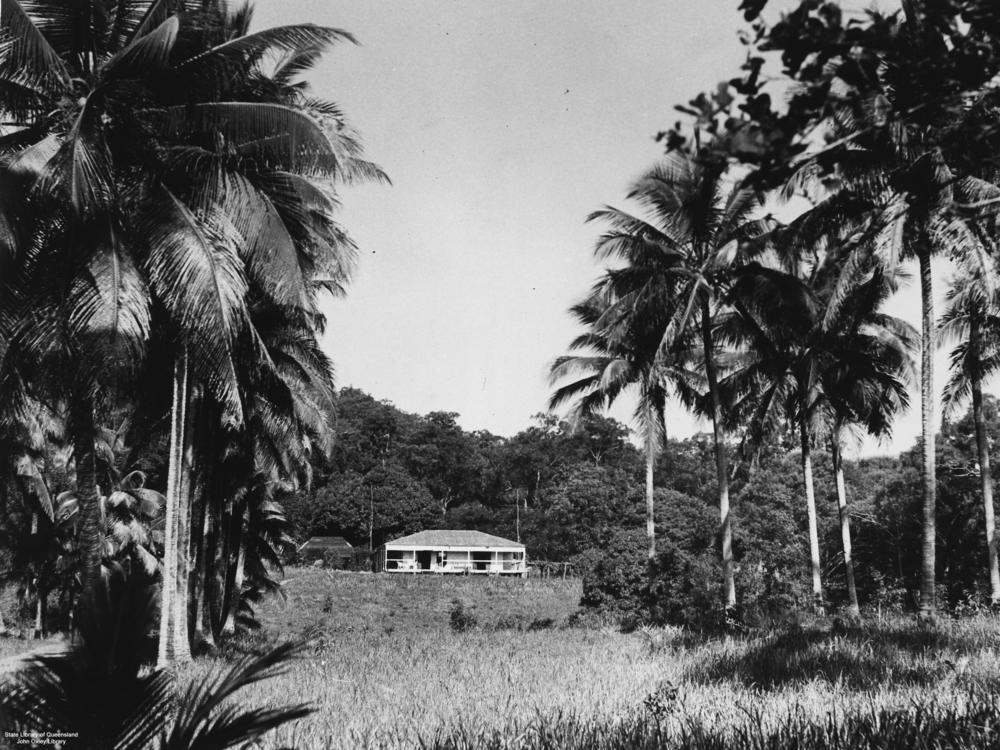
Residence of E. J. Banfield on Dunk Island, 1935

After Banfield's death his Dunk Island property was transferred to his wife Bertha Banfield, then in 1931 to her and Spenser McTaggart Hopkins as tenants in common, and after Berth's death, to Hopkins as sole owner. During this period a manager was installed to oversee the increasing number of tourists visiting the island. Photographs from the 1920s indicate that the land between the house and the beach had been cleared; tent accommodation had been erected in the grounds; and cattle were being run on the property.

In 1936 the non-alienated parts of Dunk Island or about two thirds of its area, which Banfield had worked passionately to protect, was proclaimed as a reserve for national park and is now part of the Family Islands National Park.

The remaining part of Dunk Island focussed on Brammo Bay to the north was developed as a tourist resort from the 1930s. Apparently a Captain Robert Brassey purchased the Banfield property in 1934 and by 1937 a number of small, prefabricated, low-set, fibrous-cement clad cottages had been constructed by the family on the grassed area between the Banfield house and the beach.

Close to the beach a modest, semi-enclosed timber structure with a hipped roof of corrugated iron served as the hotel bar. During World War II the Royal Australian Air Force used these facilities and also constructed an airstrip, a radar station and swing bridge on the property. Title to 107 acres (43 ha) at the northern end of Banfield's selection was transferred to Hugo Brassey (son of Capt. R Brassey) in 1948. From 1946 he had leased out the resort. In 1957 title to the property was acquired by Gordon and Kathleen Stynes, who refurbished the resort and upgraded the airstrip. In 1963–64, Avis Rent-A-Car took over the resort and began marketing the island to international tourists. During the 1970s P&O Resorts, through their company Great Barrier Reef Hotels Pty, and Trans Australian Airlines (TAA, later to become Australian Airlines) purchased and redeveloped the resort. The only structure known to survive from Banfield's time on the island is the cairn marking his grave and that of his wife.

On 28 January 1971, an Order-in-Council gazetted a block of 47.9 perches (1,210 m^{2}) of land surrounding Banfield's grave as a Reserve for Museum (Banfield Memorial) Purposes, with the University College of Townsville, later James Cook University, appointed as trustee. Mr Eric McIlree, Chairman and Managing Director of Avis Rent-a-Car had surrendered the land to the Crown, having had it surveyed in October 1967. Although various proposals to establish a museum as a tribute to Banfield's contribution to Australian literature and nature conservation were discussed, nothing has eventuated. The reserve remains under James Cook University trusteeship.

== Description ==
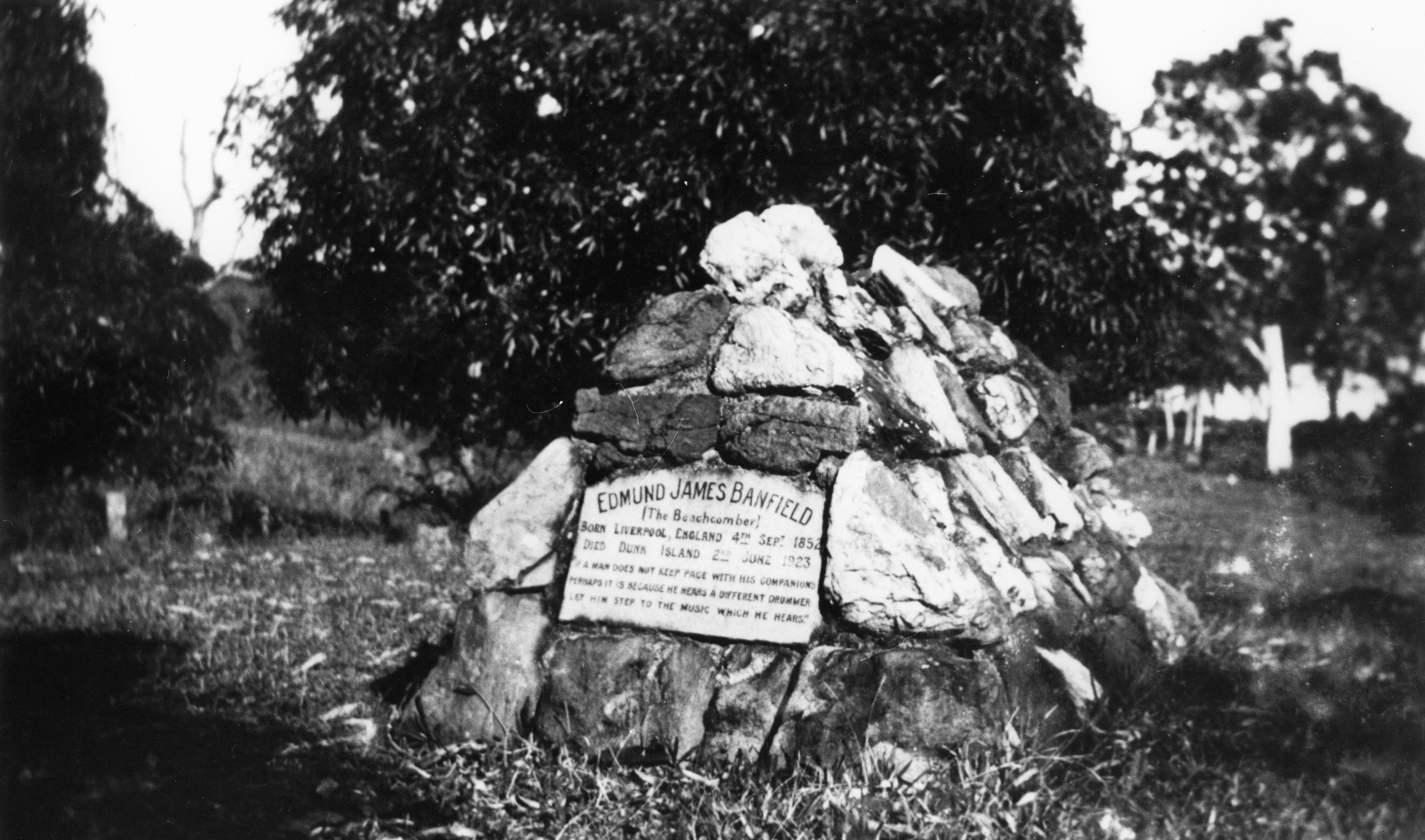
Gravestone of Edmund James Banfield, 1923 (before his wife's death and the addition of her plaque)

Banfield's Grave is located within a clearing on a memorial museum reserve on Dunk Island, a small island which lies four kilometres off the east coast of far north Queensland opposite South Mission Beach. The grave and its cairn are situated on elevated ground approximately 500 metres (1,600 ft) north-east of the main resort complex on Brammo Bay, between the current resort staff quarters and Goor-tchur Creek (an Aboriginal place name translated as Trumpet Shell and listed in Last Leaves from Dunk Island).

Promoted as an historic attraction, the grave site is accessed from the resort via a narrow inclining concrete path with supporting directional signage. The path, lined with dense vegetation, leads to a rainforest clearing that is roughly square-shaped in plan with the grave, marked by a cairn, situated in the centre. An old mango tree (which is evident in early photographs) is located to the south of the western approach. Earlier approaches from the north and east are no longer accessible. Within the clearing are four large ceramic plant pots in each of the corners, and two timber seats, which are not of cultural heritage significance.

The cairn is constructed of random rubble and mortar in the shape of a rudimentary triangular prism with oyster and other shells embedded in the mortar. It is orientated east–west, with the apex inclined to the east. Two marble tablets are embedded in the eastern face.

The tablet memorialising Edmund Banfield is rectangular in shape with a convex upper edge and is inscribed with his name, birthplace and date, death place and date, and a quote from Henry David Thoreau, as follows:

Edmund James Banfield The Beachcomber Born Liverpool, England, 4th September 1852 Died Dunk Island, 2nd June 1923 If a man does not keep pace with his companions perhaps it is because he hears a different drummer. Let him step to the music which he hears.

Beneath this a rectangular memorial tablet for Bertha Banfield is inscribed as follows:

Also Bertha Banfield Dearly beloved and honoured wife Born at Liverpool 19th JanY 1858 Died 6th August 1933 Whither thou goest I will go, and where thou lodgest I will lodge – where thou diest, will I die and There will I be buried.

Aligned with the eastern face of the cairn, and surrounding it on its north, south and west sides is a bed of white quartz pebbles contained within an edging of granite rocks. Adjacent to the eastern face of the cairn are two objects – a giant clam shell and a stone bowl. The bed and objects are not evident in early photographs and therefore not of cultural heritage significance.

Beyond the clearing in which the cairn is located, the reserve is covered with dense rainforest re-growth.

== Heritage listing ==
Banfield Memorial Reserve and Grave was listed on the Queensland Heritage Register on 6 August 2010 having satisfied the following criteria.

The place is important in demonstrating the evolution or pattern of Queensland's history.

Banfield Memorial Reserve and Grave is located on Dunk Island, which lies within the Great Barrier Reef World Heritage Area. The place memorialises Queensland naturalist Edmund James Banfield (1852–1923), the first European settler on Dunk island and a nationally and internationally renowned author whose work to protect the indigenous flora and fauna of the Family Islands group (of which Dunk Island is a part) is important to the early evolution of nature conservation in Queensland. His contribution to what today may be called early "eco tourism" is equally valuable. Both his grave (1923), marked by a cairn made of local stone, and the reserve around it (created in 1971), which was part of his former selection and now supports the rainforest habitat he so eloquently recorded in his renowned books, are memorials to Banfield and his drive to protect the natural environment.

The place has a special association with the life or work of a particular person, group or organisation of importance in Queensland's history.

The memorial reserve and grave has a special association with EJ Banfield (1852–1923), who contributed significantly to our understanding of tropical environments and habitats between 1897 and 1923, as well as regarding the Aboriginal traditional owners of the Family Islands before they were removed to various Queensland mission settlements in the early twentieth century. His published accounts of Dunk Island's natural and cultural environment established his reputation as a committed naturalist who contributed to the development of early nature reserves in far north Queensland, and became texts celebrated by romantics, escapists, naturalists and scientists. His work inspired national and international naturalists, artists and authors to travel to north Queensland, particularly to the islands of the Great Barrier Reef, and to work or conduct further research in the area.
