= Dunk, Queensland =

Dunk
- Suburb
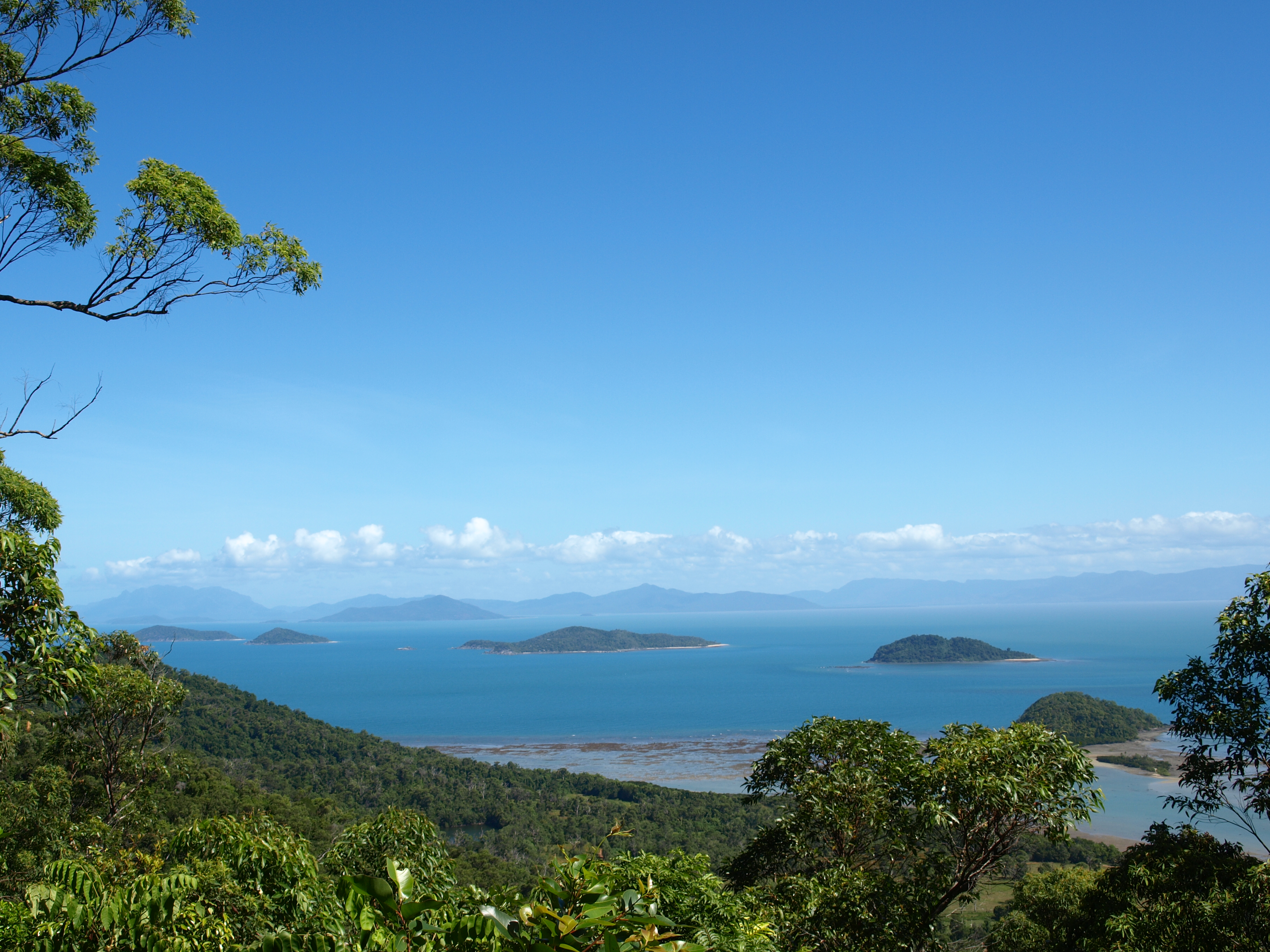
- Looking from Mount Kootaloo on Dunk Island across to some of the other islands in Dunk, 2009

- Interactive map of Dunk
- Coordinates: 17.9888°S 146.1536°E
- Country: Australia
- State: Queensland
- LGA: Cassowary Coast Region

Government
  - State electorates: Hill; Hinchinbrook

Area
  - Total: 154.9 km^{2} (59.8 sq mi)

Population
  - Total: 23 (2021 census)
  - Density: 0.148/km^{2} (0.385/sq mi)
- Time zone: UTC+10:00 (AEST)
- Postcode: 4852
Suburbs around Dunk
Wongaling Beach	Coral Sea	Coral Sea
South Mission Beach	Dunk	Coral Sea
Hull Heads	Coral Sea	Coral Sea

Dunk is an island group locality consisting of the Family Islands in the Coral Sea within the Cassowary Coast Region, Queensland, Australia. In the 2021 census, Dunk had a population of 23 people.

== Geography ==
The named islands within the locality include (from north to south):

- Mound Island (Purtaboi Island, 17.9253°S 146.1364°E)
- Dunk Island (Coonanglebah, 17.9453°S 146.1578°E)
- Mung Um Gnackum Island (17.9511°S 146.1419°E)
- Kumboola Island (17.9555°S 146.1421°E)
- Wolngarin Island (17.9689°S 146.1808°E)
- Thorpe Island (Timana, 17.9821°S 146.1369°E)
- Bedarra Island (Richards Island, 18.0042°S 146.1486°E)
- Pee Rahm Ah Island (18.0062°S 146.1583°E)
- Wheeler Island (18.0261°S 146.1667°E)
- Smith Island (18.0379°S 146.1999°E)
- Coombe Island (18.0400°S 146.1772°E)
- Bowden Island (Budg-Joo Island, 18.043°S 146.1972°E)
- Hudson Island (Coolah, 18.0503°S 146.2017°E)

Many of the islands are entirely within the Family Islands National Park (from north to south): Mound, Dunk (partially), Mung Um Gnackum, Kumboola, Wolngarin, Pee Rahm Ah Island, Wheeler, Smith, Coombe, Bowden and Hudson.

== History ==
The locality presumably takes its name from the largest island, Dunk Island.

HMS Paluma arrived in Brisbane on 7 May 1885. Construction cost 35,000 pounds sterling. The ship's name was the Aboriginal word for "thunder". Over the next eight years, Paluma conducted survey work on the Great Barrier Reef for the Admiralty. The European names of many of the islands reflect the names of the officers on the Paluma: Lieutenant G. Richards, commander; Lieutenants Wheeler, Combe and Bowden-Smith; Dr. Thorpe, surgeon, and Mr. Hudson, engineer.

== Demographics ==
In the 2016 census, Dunk had a population of 21 people.

In the 2021 census, Dunk had a population of 23 people.

== Education ==
There are no schools in Dunk. The alternatives are distance education and boarding school.
