= Acacia fleckeri =

Scientific classification
- Kingdom: Plantae
- Clade: Tracheophytes
- Clade: Angiosperms
- Clade: Eudicots
- Clade: Rosids
- Order: Fabales
- Family: Fabaceae
- Subfamily: Caesalpinioideae
- Clade: Mimosoid clade
- Genus: Acacia
- Species: A. fleckeri

Binomial name
- Acacia fleckeri Pedley
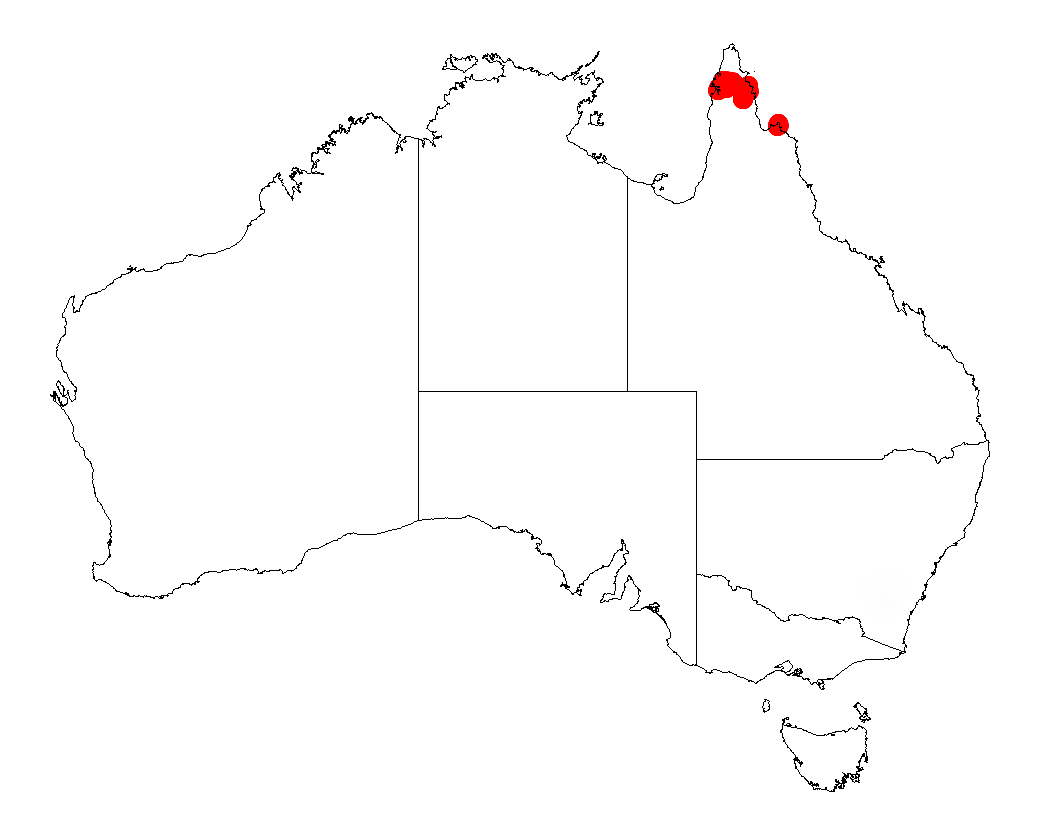
- Occurrence data from AVH

Synonyms
- Racosperma fleckeri (Leslie Pedley) Pedley

Species of legume

Acacia fleckeri is a species of flowering plant in the family Fabaceae and is endemic to northern Queensland, Australia. It is a tree with pendulous, glabrous branchlets, narrowly elliptic to lance-shaped phyllodes with the narrower end towards the base, spherical heads of golden yellow flowers and linear, leathery pods.

== Description ==
Acacia fleckeri is a tree that typically grows to a height of 3–13 m (9.8–42.7 ft) and has pendulous, glabrous branchlets with lenticels. Its phyllodes are thinly leathery, narrowly elliptic to lance-shaped with the narrower end towards the base, straight or slightly curved, 9–170 mm (0.35–6.69 in) long and 13–45 mm (0.5–1.8 in) wide. The phyllodes have three to six main veins and a gland up to 2 mm (0.079 in) above the base of the phyllode. The flowers are borne in spherical heads in axils on a glabrous peduncle 4–7 mm (0.16–0.28 in) long, sometimes to 12 mm (0.47 in) long in the fruiting stage. The heads are 4.5–5.0 mm (0.18–0.20 in) in diameter with 30 to 40 golden yellow flowers. The pods are linear, leathery and glabrous, up to 120 mm (4.7 in) long, 8–11 mm (0.31–0.43 in) wide and alternately raised over the seeds on each side. The seeds are broadly elliptic, about 4 mm (0.16 in) long, and dull brown with an aril.

== Taxonomy ==
Acacia fleckeri was first formally described in 1978 by the botanist Leslie Pedley in the journal Austrobaileya from specimens collected near the Pascoe River on the Iron Range to Wenlock road in 1948.

== Distribution ==
This species of wattle is found on the Cape York Peninsula of Queensland from around Weipa in the west to around Bowden and the Pascoe and Wenlock Rivers in the east. It grows along sandy creek or river banks or on shell mounds with species of Eucalyptus, Melaleuca, Leptospermum and other species of Acacia.

== See also ==
- List of Acacia species
