= Kumboola Island =

Island in Queensland, Australia

- Interactive map of Kumboola Island

Geography
- Location: Northern Australia
- Coordinates: 17.9555°S 146.1421°E
- Area: 0.06 km^{2} (0.023 sq mi)

Administration
- Australia
- State: Queensland

Kumboola Island is an island in the Family Islands group. It is part of the Family Islands National Park and within the locality of Dunk in the Cassowary Coast Region, Queensland, Australia.

It is located approximately 15 km North East of Tully Heads and immediately south of Dunk Island.

It is around 6 hectares or 0.06 square km in size.

The island contains areas of rainforest and transitional forests where eucalypt species are emerging.

== See also ==
- List of islands of Australia
