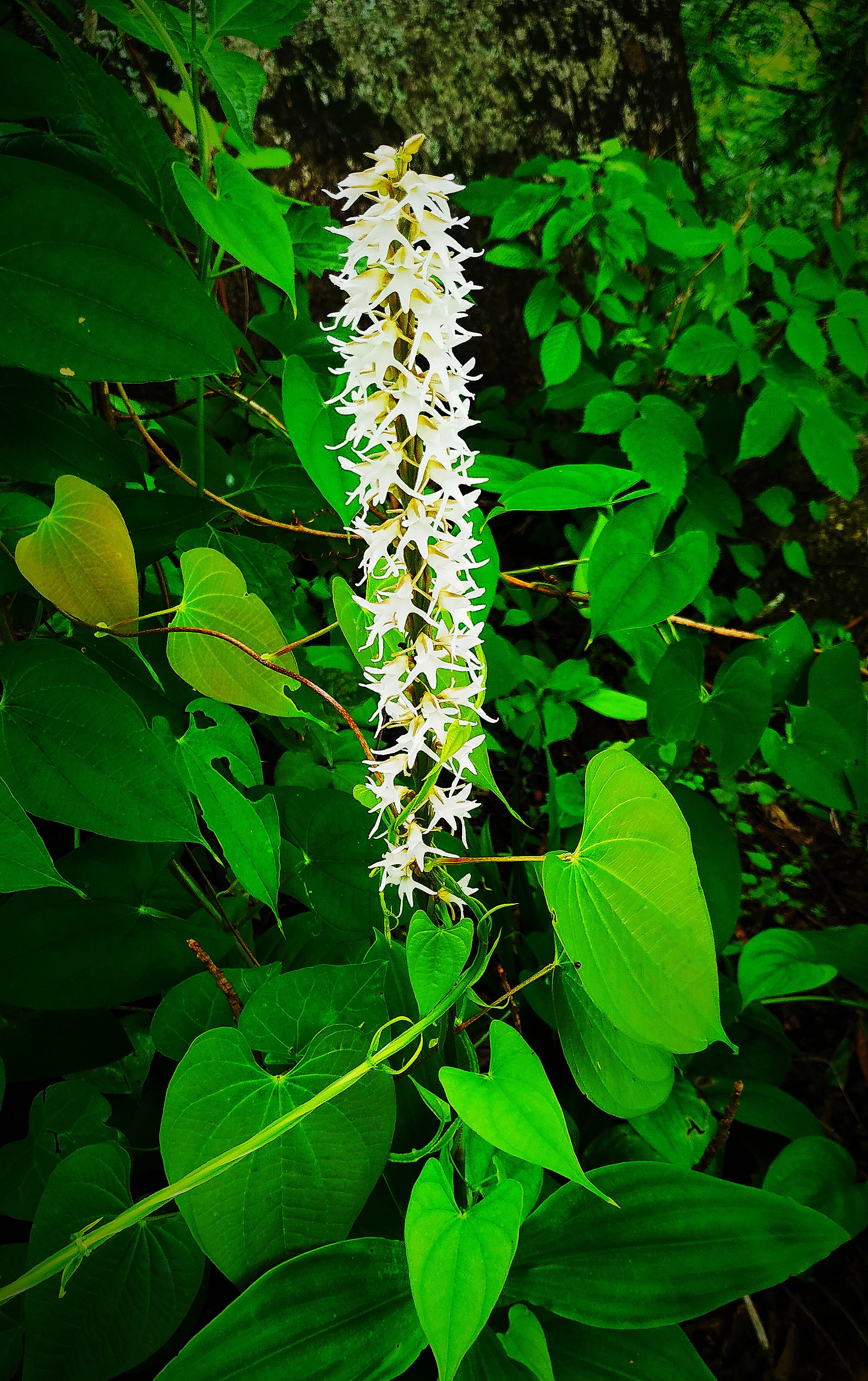

Scientific classification
- Kingdom: Plantae
- Clade: Tracheophytes
- Clade: Angiosperms
- Clade: Monocots
- Order: Asparagales
- Family: Orchidaceae
- Subfamily: Orchidoideae
- Genus: Peristylus
- Species: P. constrictus

Binomial name
- Peristylus constrictus (Lindl.) Lindl.

Synonyms
- Habenaria constricta Lindl.; Habenaria constricta Hook.f.; Habenaria cylindrocalyx Gagnep.; Herminium constrictum Ham. ex Hook.f.; Platanthera constricta Lindl. ex Wall., nom. nud.

= Peristylus constrictus =

Species of ground orchid

Peristylus constrictus is a ground orchid species from the genus Peristylus. It is found in Assam, Bangladesh, Myanmar, Thailand, Cambodia, the Himalayan region, Nepal, Vietnam and the Philippines. It produces fragrant white flowers in late spring or early summer.
