= Bedarra Island =

Island in Queensland, Australia

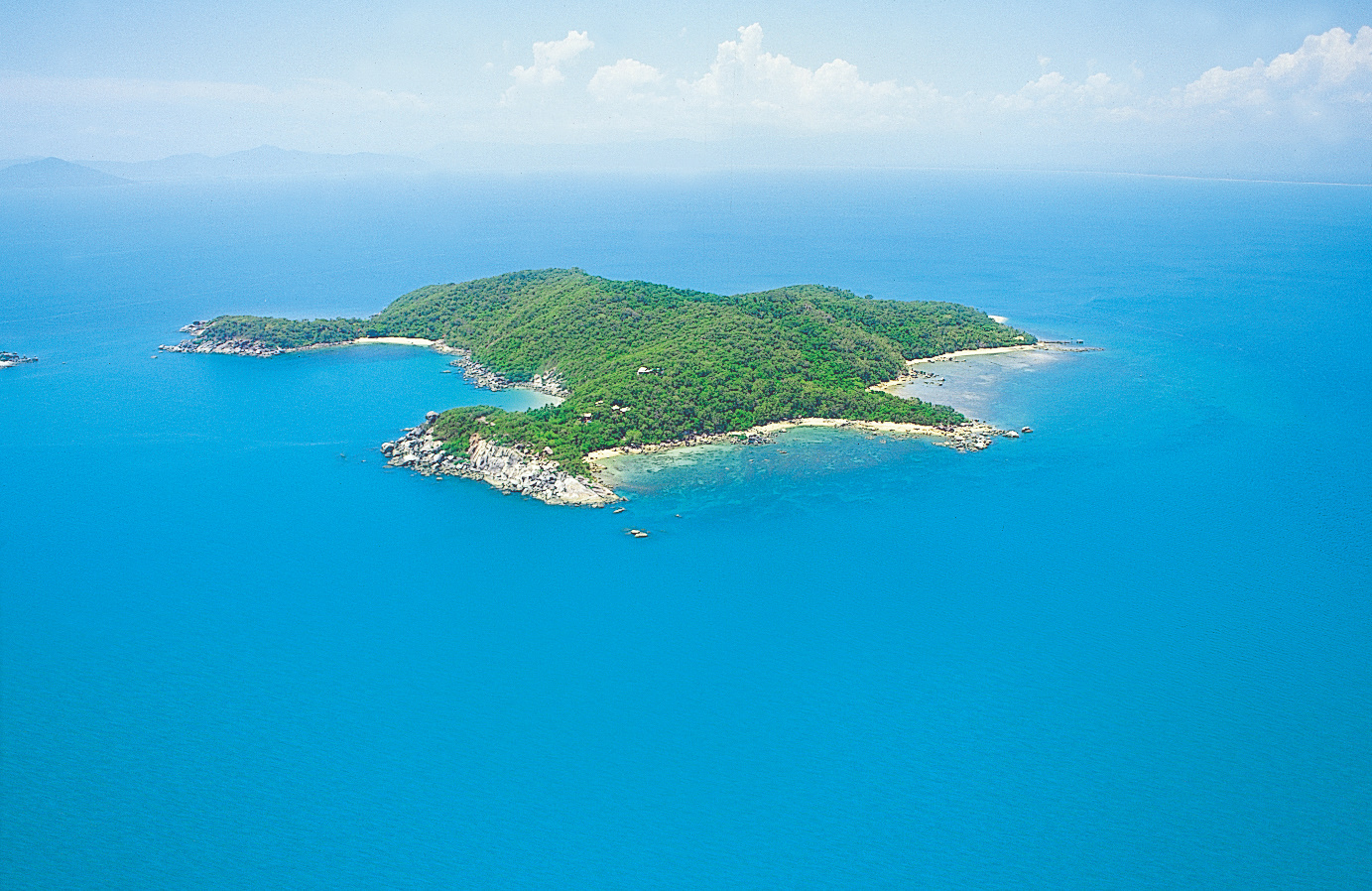
- Bedarra Island

- Location within Queensland
- Location: Queensland
- Nearest city: Mission Beach
- Coordinates: 18°00′14″S 146°08′56″E
- Area: 1 km^{2} (0.39 sq mi)

Bedarra Island (also known as Richards Island) is one of the Family Islands group within the locality of Dunk in the Cassowary Coast Region, Queensland, Australia.

== Geography ==
Bedarra Island is approximately seven kilometres off the tropical North Queensland coast, midway between Townsville and Cairns, the nearest coastal town being Mission Beach. It is in the middle of Family Islands National Park. The granite island was part of the mainland before the last sea level rise began 8,000 years ago.

The island consists of pristine coral sandy beaches with coves formed by giant granite boulders and fringed with lush green jungle. Bedarra is a continental island made up of granite boulder formations that rise to moderately high rocky peaks, with steep granite escarpments on the north-easterly and south-easterly aspects.

=== Sandspits ===
All the islands in the Family Group have a shelving sandspit at their northwestern corner giving them a family "resemblance". These sandspits offer ideal sheltered boat landings and deep water swimming at the lowest tide. The sand is drawn out into a narrow spit by the wave action and sea currents from the prevailing sou'easters and nor'easters. Bedarra Island has a northwest sandspit.

== History ==
Captain James Cook first placed the Family Isles on the map when exploring the coast of Australia in HMS Endeavour in June 1770. He named the larger "The Father Isle" or Dunk Island, after the First Lord of the Admiralty, Montagu Dunk, the Earl of Sandwich. The next largest island he called "The Mother Isle" which became known as Bedarra Island. The other islands he referred to as "The Children".

Initially marine charts referred to Bedarra island as Richards Island then Allason Island after the first European settler, Captain Henry Allason. Early in the 20th century author Edmund James Banfield who lived as a beachcomber on Dunk Island began using the name Bedarra, a misspelling of the Aboriginal term Biagurra, which roughly translates to "the place of endless water".

Allason, inspired by Banfields book Confessions of A Beachcomber, purchased Bedarra from the Queensland Lands Department in 1913 for 20 pounds. He and his wife settled there until he was forced to return to Europe when World War I broke out. When Allason on-sold the property to the Harris syndicate of London in 1934 it looked for a time like it might become a home for underprivileged boys.

The island is privately owned. Noel Wood, an Australian landscape artist, purchased East Bedarra in the late 1930s and over time it was developed into a luxury tourist destination.

== Climate ==
Bedarra Island experiences daytime temperatures ranging from 23 degrees Celsius in the winter months of June and July to 30 degrees Celsius in the height of summer between December and January. High rainfall from December to March can be expected due to the tropical nature of the island.

=== Cyclone Yasi ===
Between AEST 23:57, 2 February 2011, and 00:27, 3 February 2011, the eye of Cyclone Yasi passed directly over Bedarra Island as a Category 5 tropical cyclone. Bedarra Island Resort and a number of private homes were damaged with buildings left in splinters, facilities in ruins and gardens stripped bare. After a major cleanup and reinvestment Bedarra Island Resort and the seven privately owned houses on the island have been fully repaired and open for holiday lettings.

== Fauna ==
There is diversity of animal and insect life in the wet tropical rainforest on Bedarra. The vibrant blue Ulysses butterfly, the giant birdwing butterfly, northern rainforest skink, scrubfowl, the wompoo fruit dove, sunbirds, tree frogs, geckos, forest dragons, tree monitors, pythons and echidna have all made a habitat here.

Sea turtles and dugongs can be observed around Bedarra Island and recently Migaloo, the white humped back whale, was spotted from a lookout engaged in its annual migration north (late June).

The island has few mammals; the largest is the echidna and there is also the fawn footed melomys, a small native rodent named after Edmund James Banfield who first described it. This native, fruit eating marsupial rat is called "Uromys banfieldi".

Several species of bats and flying foxes are seen and heard at night. Unique to this area is the little bent-wing bat, "Miniopterus Australis". The tiny bat gets its name from its elongated finger bone that supports its wing. They are usually colonial in their roost behaviour, nesting in caves, crevices and sometimes roof ceilings of the open plan houses on the island.

The most easily observed bird life in the rainforest, are the large mound builders – the orange-footed scrubfowl.

== Tourism ==
The island is divided into three main sections. One section comprises Bedarra Island Resort, a twelve villa resort catering to the luxury tourism market. Another section known as East Bedarra comprises seven privately owned upmarket holiday rentals on the land once owned by artist Noel Wood. The third section known as Bedarra Hideaway comprises an old 16-room resort that has not operated since 1991.

== Noel Wood ==
Australian artist Noel Wood (1912–2001) visited the island in 1936 and negotiated the purchase of a site near the mangroves on one side of the peninsula. He was a colourful modernist, landscape artist and early conservationist managed the property and painted at East Bedarra for close to 60-years. Noel Wood named many of its picturesque locations including Melaleuca Beach, The Mangroves, Calophyllum Beach, Casurina Beach, Valley Beach, Orchid Beach, Tiki Beach and Hernandia Bay. This is confirmed by author James Porter a direct relative of Wood. Wood also named the Coral Gardens as a reference to Banfield's memories of Dunk Island in "Confessions of a Beachcomber".

Public collections of Wood's works are held throughout Australia and form part of private collections in the UK and US. Although he worked in Ireland, Britain and Europe in the late 1940s and was in the US in the 1950s he always returned to his East Bedarra studio and gardens. He was a permanent resident from 1936 to 1947 and from 1957 to 2001. Wood lived on the island until 1993 when his parcel of land was subdivided. Eight privately owned houses are located on this section of Bedarra Island.

=== An artists' haven ===
From 1941 to 1957 the artist John Busst and his wife Alison were in residence on Bedarra Island. Busst was responsible for having the Great Barrier Reef listed as World Heritage Park, even though this was achieved after his death. Harold Holt and his wife Zara were friends with the Bussts and regularly visited them on the island. (Holt would later become Prime Minister.)

The original Busst house on Bedarra included a large Spanish style art studio facing an inner courtyard garden, colour washed mud brick walls with wide shady verandas running around the three outer sides of the U-shaped dwelling, The house was demolished during the 1980s.

After they sold this section of the island, now known as Bedarra Bay, the Bussts moved to Bingil Bay which to this day is known as the home of the "greenie" – John Busst was considered the original environmentalist or "greenie".

There is a brass plaque at the northern end of Bingil Bay - the tribute from poet Judith Wright reads "John Busst, Artist and lover of beauty, who thought that man and nature might survive".

Another respected local artist who resided on Bedarra Island from 1986 was Helen Wiltshire (1945–2011). She and her husband rebuilt the old studio which is located in a secluded valley amongst the old orchard trees.

Helen's eulogy makes mention of a footpath that she worked on from her studio, past the spring towards the beach and that the residents on the island had nicknamed the pathway "Helen's Highway".

== Ownership changes ==
In 1938, after artist Noel Wood was established in his island paradise, Frank Coleman and his family from the Atherton Tableland, arrived after negotiating a purchase price for the rest of the island. In 1940, artist John Busst leased the south-eastern corner for ten shillings a week before the Coleman's sold to former island guests Dick Greatrix and Pierre Huret who had fallen in love with the place. The two men lived on the island for seven years creating an area of landscaped gardens and introducing exotic plants to the rainforest before selling to longtime tenant Busst and his sister Phyllis. Portions of the island were sub-divided and sold off over the years until in 1957 Ken and Cynthia Druitt took over and developed a small tourist resort. That year John Busst sold his remaining holding at Bedarra Bay, to Colin Scott, a grazier from Victoria, who ran the property as a private retreat. In 1979, Tor Hulten, from Sweden converted the property into the Toranna Plantation tourist resort.

In 1980, Australian Airlines, owners of the neighbouring Dunk Island Resort, purchased Ken and Cynthia Druitt's holding, ultimately creating Bedarra Hideaway Resort and running day trips for Dunk Island guests. The airline also acquired Toranna Plantation which in 1988 was transformed into the exclusive Bedarra Bay Resort. Bedarra Hideaway Resort was closed in October 1991 after Qantas took over Australian Airlines. P&O purchased the properties in March 1998 and after extensive refurbishment over several years sold to Voyages Hotels & Resorts in August 2004. In September 2009, it was purchased by Hideaway Resorts.

In 2011 Bedarra Island Resort was purchased by the Charlton Hotel group who repaired damage to the resort caused by Cyclone Yasi and re-opened the resort to guests in July 2013.
