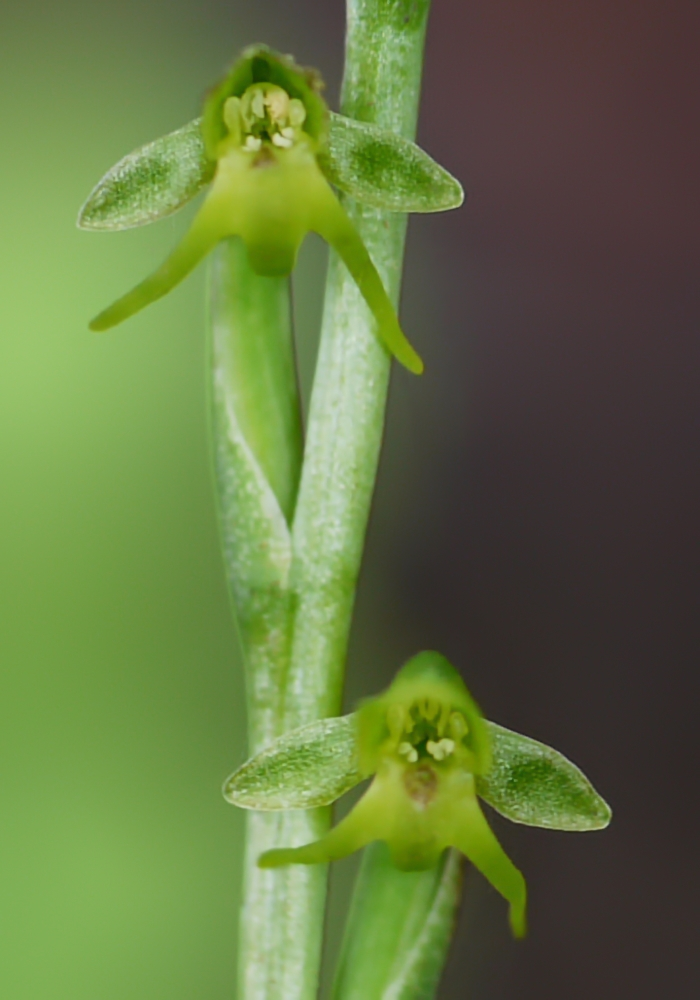
- Peristylus aristatus - a native of India, Sri Lanka and Myanmar

Scientific classification
- Kingdom: Plantae
- Clade: Embryophytes
- Clade: Tracheophytes
- Clade: Angiosperms
- Clade: Monocots
- Order: Asparagales
- Family: Orchidaceae
- Subfamily: Orchidoideae
- Tribe: Orchideae
- Subtribe: Orchidinae
- Genus: Peristylus; Blume

Synonyms
- Glossula Lindl.; Glossaspis Spreng.; Coeloglossum Lindl., illegitimate homonym; Digomphotis Raf.; Choeradoplectron Schauer; Lindblomia Fr.

= Peristylus =

Genus of orchids

Peristylus, sometimes commonly known as ogre orchids or bog orchids is a genus of flowering plants from the orchid family, Orchidaceae. It consists of over 100 known species found across much of eastern and southern Asia as well as in Australia and on many islands of the Indian and Pacific Oceans.

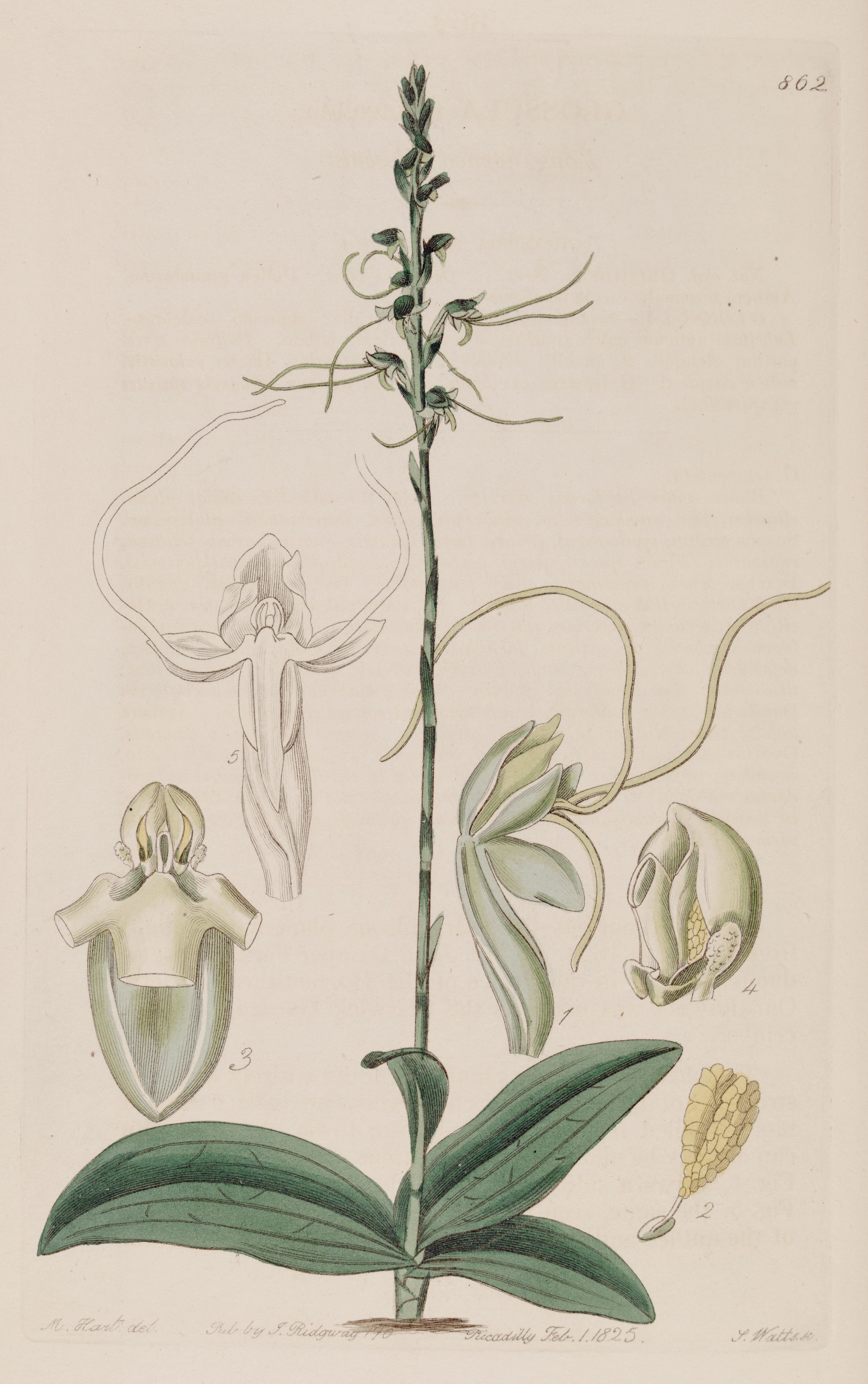
Peristylus tentaculatus 1824 illustration

== Description ==
Orchids in the genus Peristylis are terrestrial, perennial, deciduous, sympodial herbs with paired fleshy tubers and thread-like, unbranched roots. The stems are upright and unbranched. The leaves are arranged in a rosette at the base of the plants or near the centre of the stem. The flowers are resupinate, usually small, often crowded, white, green or yellowish and usually only last a few days. The dorsal sepal and petals overlap to form a hood over the column. The labellum has a spur and usually three lobes which may be short or long and threadlike. The distinguishing feature of the genus is the presence of two club-shaped projections on the stigma. In many respects, plants in this genus are similar to those in Habenaria, only differing in the structure of the column.

== Taxonomy and naming ==
The genus Peristylus was first formally described in 1825 by Carl Ludwig Blume and the description was published in Bijdragen tot de flora van Nederlandsch Indië . The name Peristylus is derived from the Greek words peri meaning 'around', and stylos 'column', referring to the arms on each side of the column.

== Distribution ==
Orchids in the genus Peristylus are found in Japan, China, Mongolia, India, Indochina, Indonesia, Philippines, Malaysia, New Guinea, Polynesia and Australia.

== Species ==
As of March 2018, the World Checklist of Selected Plant Families accepted the following species:

- Peristylus affinis (D.Don) Seidenf. – Himalaya to S. China and Indo-China
- Peristylus aliformis (C.Schweinf.) Renz & Vodonaivalu – Fiji
- Peristylus alpinipaludosus (P.Royen) Schuit. & de Vogel – W. New Guinea
- Peristylus aristatus Lindl. – Indian Subcontinent to Myanmar
- Peristylus balaenolabium Ormerod – Sumatera
- Peristylus balakrishnanii Karthig., Sumathi & Jayanthi – S. Andaman Islands
- Peristylus banfieldii (F.M.Bailey) Lavarack – N. & N.E. Queensland
- Peristylus biermannianus (King & Pantl.) X.H.Jin – Central & E. Himalaya
- Peristylus bismarckiensis (Schltr.) P.F.Hunt – Papua New Guinea
- Peristylus brachyphyllus A.Rich. – S. India
- Peristylus brassii Ormerod – W. New Guinea
- Peristylus brevicalcar Carr – Borneo (Gunung Kinabalu)
- Peristylus brevilobus Thwaites – Sri Lanka
- Peristylus calcaratus (Rolfe) S.Y.Hu – E. Nepal, S. China to Vietnam, Taiwan
- Peristylus carnosipetalus Kurzweil – N. Thailand
- Peristylus carolinensis (Schltr.) Tuyama – Caroline Islands
- Peristylus chapaensis (Gagnep.) Seidenf. – N. Vietnam
- Peristylus chlorandrellus D.L.Jones & M.A.Clem. – Queensland
- Peristylus ciliatus Carr – Borneo (Gunung Kinabalu)
- Peristylus ciliolatus J.J.Sm. – New Guinea
- Peristylus citrinus (Thouars) Lindl. – Mascarenes
- Peristylus commersonianus Lindl. – Réunion
- Peristylus constrictus (Lindl.) Lindl. – Indian Subcontinent to Indo-China
- Peristylus cryptostylus (Rchb.f.) Ormerod – Society Islands
- Peristylus cubitalis (L.) Kraenzl. – India to Myanmar
- Peristylus cymbochilus Renz – Papua New Guinea
- Peristylus densus (Lindl.) Santapau & Kapadia – Indian Subcontinent to S. China, S. Korea, S. Central & S. Japan to Nansei-shoto
- Peristylus djampangensis J.J.Sm. – Jawa
- Peristylus elbertii J.J.Sm. – Lesser Sunda Islands
- Peristylus flexuosus (Thouars) S.Moore – Mascarenes
- Peristylus formosanus (Schltr.) T.P.Lin – Central Nansei-shoto to Taiwan
- Peristylus gardneri (Hook.f.) Kraenzl. – Sri Lanka
- Peristylus goodyeroides (D.Don) Lindl. – Tropical & Subtrop. Asia
- Peristylus gracilis Blume – Assam to Taiwan (Lan Yü) and Malesia
- Peristylus grandis Blume – Thailand (Ko Tarutao) to New Guinea
- Peristylus hallieri J.J.Sm. – Borneo
- Peristylus hamiltonianus (Lindl.) Lindl. – Central & E. Himalaya to Thailand
- Peristylus hatusimanus T.Hashim. – Japan (Kyushu)
- Peristylus holochila (Hillebr.) N.Hallé – Hawaiian Islands
- Peristylus holttumianus Seidenf. ex Aver. – S. Vietnam
- Peristylus holttumii Seidenf. – S. Indo-China to Peninsula Malaysia
- Peristylus hylophiloides Ormerod – Philippines
- Peristylus intrudens (Ames) Ormerod – Central Nepal, Indo-China, China (Hong Kong), C. Taiwan, Philippines (Luzon)
- Peristylus iyoensis Ohwi – E. Nepal, N. Thailand, S. Korea, S. Central & S. Japan, Central & S. Taiwan
- Peristylus jinchuanicus K.Y.Lang – China (W. Sichuan, N.W. Yunnan)
- Peristylus kerrii Seidenf. – N. Thailand
- Peristylus kinabaluensis Carr – Borneo (Gunung Kinabalu)
- Peristylus korinchensis Ridl. – Sumatera
- Peristylus kumaonensis Renz – W. Himalaya
- Peristylus lacertifer (Lindl.) J.J.Sm. – Central Himalaya to S. Japan and W. Malesia
- Peristylus lancifolius A.Rich. – S. India
- Peristylus latilobus J.J.Sm. – E. Jawa
- Peristylus lawii Wight – Himalaya to India
- Peristylus listeroides (Schltr.) P.F.Hunt – New Guinea
- Peristylus lombokensis J.J.Sm. – Lesser Sunda Islands
- Peristylus macer (Schltr.) P.F.Hunt – New Guinea
- Peristylus maculifer (C.Schweinf.) Renz & Vodonaivalu – Vanuatu, Fiji (Vanua Levu)
- Peristylus maingayi (King & Pantl.) J.J.Wood & Ormerod – S. Indo-China to N. Queensland
- Peristylus minimiflorus (Kraenzl.) N.Hallé – New Caledonia (Î. des Pins), Futuna, Cook Islands
- Peristylus minimus Kurzweil & Tripetch – Thailand
- Peristylus monticola (Ridl.) Seidenf. – Andaman Islands, Malesia to New Guinea
- Peristylus mucronatus J.J.Sm. – Maluku (Seram)
- Peristylus nanus (Schltr.) P.F.Hunt – New Guinea
- Peristylus norumbus Ormerod – Papua New Guinea
- Peristylus novoebudarum F.Muell. – S.W. Pacific
- Peristylus nymanianus Kraenzl. – New Guinea
- Peristylus ovariophorus (Schltr.) Carr – Borneo (Sarawak)
- Peristylus pachyneuroides Renz – Papua New Guinea
- Peristylus pachyneurus (Schltr.) P.F.Hunt – New Guinea
- Peristylus palawensis (Tuyama) Tuyama – Caroline Islands
- Peristylus parishii Rchb.f. – Indian Subcontinent to S. China and Indo-China
- Peristylus phuwuanensis Kurzweil – N.E. Thailand
- Peristylus plantagineus (Lindl.) Lindl. – India, Sri Lanka
- Peristylus ponerostachys (Rchb.f.) Ormerod – Philippines (Leyte, Mindanao)
- Peristylus prainii (Hook.f.) Kraenzl. – Central Himalaya to Indo-China
- Peristylus pseudophrys (King & Pantl.) Kraenzl. – Sikkim (Chungthang)
- Peristylus reticulatus (Ames) Ormerod – Philippines (Luzon: Mt. Pulogloko)
- Peristylus richardianus Wight – E. Nepal, S. India
- Peristylus rigidus Kurzweil – N. Thailand
- Peristylus rindjaniensis J.J.Sm. – Lesser Sunda Islands
- Peristylus sahanii Kumar, G.S.Rawat & Jalal – N.E. India
- Peristylus secundus (Lindl.) Rathakr. – S. India
- Peristylus setifer Tuyama – Caroline Islands
- Peristylus silvicola (Schltr.) P.F.Hunt – New Guinea
- Peristylus societatis (Drake) N.Hallé – Society Islands
- Peristylus spathulatus J.J.Sm. – Borneo
- Peristylus spiralis A.Rich. – S.W. India, Sri Lanka
- Peristylus staminodiatus J.J.Sm. – Sulawesi
- Peristylus stenodon (Rchb.f.) Kores – Vanuatu
- Peristylus stocksii (Hook.f.) Kraenzl. – W. India
- Peristylus subaphyllus (Gagnep.) Seidenf. – Cambodia
- Peristylus tentaculatus (Lindl.) J.J.Sm. – S. China to Hainan
- Peristylus tenuicallus Ormerod – Vietnam
- Peristylus timorensis (Ridl.) J.J.Wood & Ormerod – Lesser Sunda Islands
- Peristylus tipulifer (C.S.P.Parish & Rchb.f.) Mukerjee – India (Kerala), Central Himalaya to China (Yunnan) and Indo-China
- Peristylus tobensis J.J.Sm. – N. Sumatera
- Peristylus tradescantiifolius (Rchb.f.) Kores – Maluku to S.W. Pacific
- Peristylus triaena (Schltr.) P.F.Hunt – New Guinea to Solomon Islands
- Peristylus tricallosus J.J.Sm. – Sulawesi
- Peristylus trimenii (Hook.f.) Abeyw. – Sri Lanka
- Peristylus umbonatus (Schltr.) P.F.Hunt – New Guinea
- Peristylus unguiculatus J.J.Sm. – Borneo
- Peristylus wheatleyi P.J.Cribb & B.A.Lewis – Vanuatu
- Peristylus whistleri P.J.Cribb – Samoa

== See also ==
- List of Orchidaceae genera
