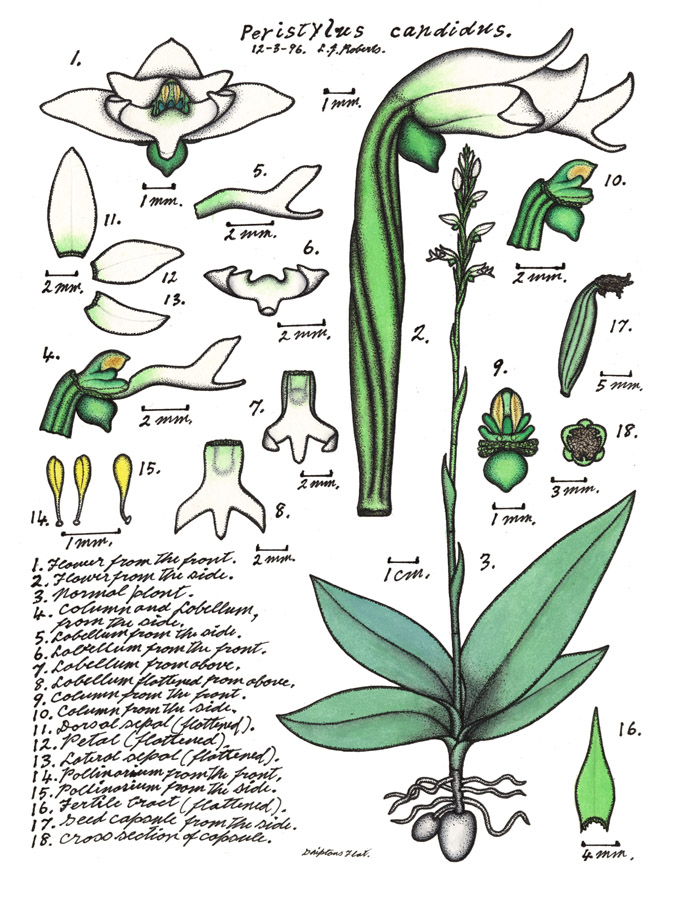
- Drawing of "P. candidus" (synonym) by Lewis Roberts

Scientific classification
- Kingdom: Plantae
- Clade: Tracheophytes
- Clade: Angiosperms
- Clade: Monocots
- Order: Asparagales
- Family: Orchidaceae
- Subfamily: Orchidoideae
- Tribe: Orchideae
- Subtribe: Orchidinae
- Genus: Peristylus
- Species: P. maingayi

Binomial name
- Peristylus maingayi (King & Pantl.) J.J.Wood & Ormerod

Synonyms
- Habenaria maingayi King & Pantl.; Peristylus candidus J.J.Sm.; Platanthera sumatrana Schltr.; Habenaria sumatrana (Schltr.) Schltr.; Habenaria ovoidea R.S.Rogers & C.T.White; Habenaria geoffrayi Gagnep.; Habenaria langbianensis Gagnep.; Herminium australe Gagnep.; Herminium annamense Gagnep.; Habenaria candida (J.J.Sm.) Masam.; Peristylus australis (Gagnep.) Tang & F.T.Wang; Peristylus langbianensis (Gagnep.) Tang & F.T.Wang

= Peristylus maingayi =

White ogre orchid

Species of orchid plant

Peristylus maingayi, commonly known as the white ogre orchid, is a species of orchid that is native to southern Indochina, New Guinea and north Queensland. It has two or three broad leaves near its base and up to fifteen small white flowers that are tube-shaped near the base and have a three-lobed labellum.

== Description ==
Peristylus banfieldii is a tuberous, perennial herb with between two and three leaves 40–80 mm (2–3 in) long and 20–25 mm (0.8–1 in) wide. Between eight and fifteen tube-shaped, white flowers 6–7 mm (0.24–0.28 in) long and 7–8 mm (0.28–0.31 in) wide are borne on a flowering stem 120–450 mm (5–20 in) tall. The dorsal sepal is 5–6 mm (0.20–0.24 in) long, about 3 mm (0.1 in) wide and forms a partial hood over the column. The lateral sepals are a similar length to the dorsal sepal but slightly narrower and spread apart from each other. The petals are more or less triangular, about 5 mm (0.2 in) long and 3 mm (0.1 in) wide. The labellum is 5–6 mm (0.20–0.24 in) long, about 4 mm (0.2 in) wide with its tip divided into three lobes about 2 mm (0.08 in) long and 1 mm (0.04 in) wide. Flowering occurs from March to May.

== Taxonomy and naming ==
The white ogre orchid was first formally described in 1897 by George King and Robert Pantling who gave it the name Habenaria maingayi and published the description in Journal of the Asiatic Society of Bengal. In 2001 Jeffrey James Wood and Paul Abel Ormerod changed the name to Peristylus maingayi. The specific epithet (maingayi) honours the collector of the type specimen, Alexander Carroll Maingay.

== Distribution and habitat ==
Peristylus maingayi grows in swampy grassland, and grassy forest and woodland. It is found in Malesia, Cambodia, Vietnam, New Guinea and northern Australia where it occurs on the Cape York Peninsula and as far south as Proserpine.
