= Peristylus biermannianus =

Scientific classification
- Kingdom: Plantae
- Clade: Tracheophytes
- Clade: Angiosperms
- Clade: Monocots
- Order: Asparagales
- Family: Orchidaceae
- Subfamily: Orchidoideae
- Genus: Peristylus
- Species: P. biermannianus

Binomial name
- Peristylus biermannianus (King & Pantl.) X.H.Jin, Schuit. & W.T.Jin

Synonyms
- Habenaria biermanniana King & Pantl.; Platanthera biermanniana (King & Pantl.) Kraenzl.

Species of flowering plant

Peristylus biermannianus is a species of flowering plant in the family Orchidaceae. It is native to Nepal and the eastern Himalayas.

== Taxonomy ==
The species was first described in 1895 as Habenaria biermanniana. It was later transferred to Platanthera. A molecular phylogenetic study in 2014 found that Platanthera biermanniana was deeply embedded inside a clade otherwise consisting of species of Peristylus. It was transferred to Peristylus, becoming Peristylus biermannianus.
