= Peristylus holochila =

Scientific classification
- Kingdom: Plantae
- Clade: Tracheophytes
- Clade: Angiosperms
- Clade: Monocots
- Order: Asparagales
- Family: Orchidaceae
- Subfamily: Orchidoideae
- Genus: Peristylus
- Species: P. holochila

Binomial name
- Peristylus holochila (Hillebr.) N.Hallé

Synonyms
- Habenaria holochila Hillebr.; Platanthera holochila (Hillebr.) Kraenzl.; Limnorchis holochila (Hildebr.) Efimov

Species of orchid

Peristylus holochila is a rare species of orchid known by the common name Hawaii bog orchid. It is endemic to Hawaii. It is a federally listed endangered species of the United States.

When the orchid was added to the Endangered Species List in 1996 there were fewer than 35 individuals remaining, divided amongst small populations located on the islands of Kauai, Maui, and Molokai. It has been extirpated from Oahu. By 2009 there were three populations for a total of 26 plants. There is only one plant remaining on Kauai and one on Maui, but neither have been observed recently. Hurricane Iniki destroyed most of the Kauai population in 1992. The largest population, located on Molokai, is surrounded by a fence for protection from feral pigs, a main threat to the survival of the species. Other threats include damage to the habitat by cattle and the invasion of introduced species of plants such as glory bush (Tibouchina herbacea), Koster's curse (Clidemia hirta), and Maui pamakani (Ageratina adenophora).

This plant grows from a tuber and produces an erect stem up to 60 centimetres (2 ft) tall. The yellow-green flowers are borne in erect spikes. Many aspects of the plant's life cycle are unknown, including its mode of reproduction, its longevity, and limiting factors. This is one of three endemic orchid species in Hawaii, and the rarest of the three. It grows in moist and wet forests and bogs, on ridges, and in the subalpine zone on lava substrates.

Conservation efforts include outplanting: planting propagated individuals in appropriate habitat. Research on the propagation of the species is continuing. It is difficult to grow in the nursery. The seeds only germinate in darkness. The plant will only grow in the presence of a mycorrhizal fungus. Without the symbiotic relationship with the fungus the plant will not grow successfully. When outplanting cultivated plantlets, care must be taken to place them next to established plants that have already associated with the fungus.
