= Hudson Island =

Island of Queensland, Australia

- Interactive map of Hudson Island

Geography
- Location: Cassowary Coast Region, Far North Queensland, Australia
- Coordinates: 18.0503°S 146.2017°E

Administration
- Australia
- State: Queensland

Hudson Island is the southernmost island of the Family Islands group with the locality of Dunk in the Cassowary Coast Region, Queensland, Australia. The Aboriginal name for this island is Coolah Island. It is located approximately 20 km East of Tully Heads.

The Great Barrier Reef Marine Park Authority has deemed this island a Sensitive Location and limits visits to two per week.

== Vegetation ==
On the windswept south-eastern sides of the island woodlands of casuarinas, wattles and eucalypts grow among slabs of granite. Rainforest species such as figs, palms, milky pines and satin ash tree are found on the sheltered northern side of the island.

== See also ==
- List of islands of Australia
