= Peristylus chlorandrellus =

Green ogre orchid

Scientific classification
- Kingdom: Plantae
- Clade: Tracheophytes
- Clade: Angiosperms
- Clade: Monocots
- Order: Asparagales
- Family: Orchidaceae
- Subfamily: Orchidoideae
- Tribe: Orchideae
- Subtribe: Orchidinae
- Genus: Peristylus
- Species: P. chlorandrellus

Binomial name
- Peristylus chlorandrellus D.L.Jones & M.A.Clem.

Species of orchid

Peristylus chlorandrellus, commonly known as the green ogre orchid, is a species of orchid that is endemic to north-eastern Queensland. It has between four and seven leaves near its base and up to thirty six green flowers with a three-lobed labellum.

== Description ==
Peristylus chlorandrellus is a tuberous, perennial herb with between four and seven dark green, succulent leaves forming a rosette around the stem. The leaves are 90–170 mm (4–7 in) long and 25–30 mm (0.98–1.2 in) wide. Between six and thirty six green flowers 8–10 mm (0.3–0.4 in) long and 6–7 mm (0.24–0.28 in) wide are borne on a flowering stem 100–600 mm (4–20 in) tall. The dorsal sepal is about 3 mm (0.1 in) long and 1.5–2 mm (0.06–0.08 in) wide, forming a partial hood over the column. The lateral sepals are a similar size to the dorsal sepal and more or less erect. The petals are about slightly longer and wider than the sepals. The labellum is about 5 mm (0.2 in) long, 7–8 mm (0.28–0.31 in) wide and has three lobes. The middle lobe is about 2 mm (0.08 in) long and 1.5 mm (0.06 in) wide but the side lobes are longer but narrower. Flowering occurs from May to July.

== Taxonomy and naming ==
Peristylus chlorandrellus was first formally described in 2004 by David Jones and Mark Clements and the description was published in The Orchadian. The specific epithet (chlorandrellus) is derived from the Ancient Greek word chloros meaning "green" and aner meaning "a man" with the Latin suffix -ellus meaning "little".

== Distribution and habitat ==
The green ochre orchid usually grows in rainforest and is found in Queensland between the McIlwraith Range and Ingham.
