= Wheeler Island (Queensland) =

Island in Queensland, Australia

Coordinates: 18.0261°S 146.1667°E

Wheeler Island is one of the middle islands of the Family Islands group within the locality of Dunk in the Cassowary Coast Region, Queensland. Australia. It is located approximately 15 km East of Tully Heads. The Aboriginal name for this island is Toolgbar.

Wheeler Island is believed to be named after Lieutenant F.S. Wheeler who was a Royal Navy hydrographer officer on the survey vessel HMS Paluma from 1885 to 1888. Other islands in the group are named after other officers on the Paluma.

The GBRMPA has deemed this island a Sensitive Location and limited visits to 2 per week.

== See also ==
- List of islands of Australia
