= Bowden Island =

Island in Queensland, Australia

- Interactive map of Bowden Island

Geography
- Location: Northern Australia
- Coordinates: 18.043°S 146.1972°E

Administration
- Australia
- State: Queensland

Bowden Island is one of the southern islands of the Family Islands group within the locality of Dunk in the Cassowary Coast Region, Queensland, Australia. It is located approximately 20 km East of Tully Heads.

The Aboriginal name for this island is Budg-Joo Island.

The GBRMPA has deemed this island a Sensitive Location and limited visits to 2 per week.
