= Edmund James Banfield =

British-born Australian naturalist and writer (1852–1923)

E. J. Banfield
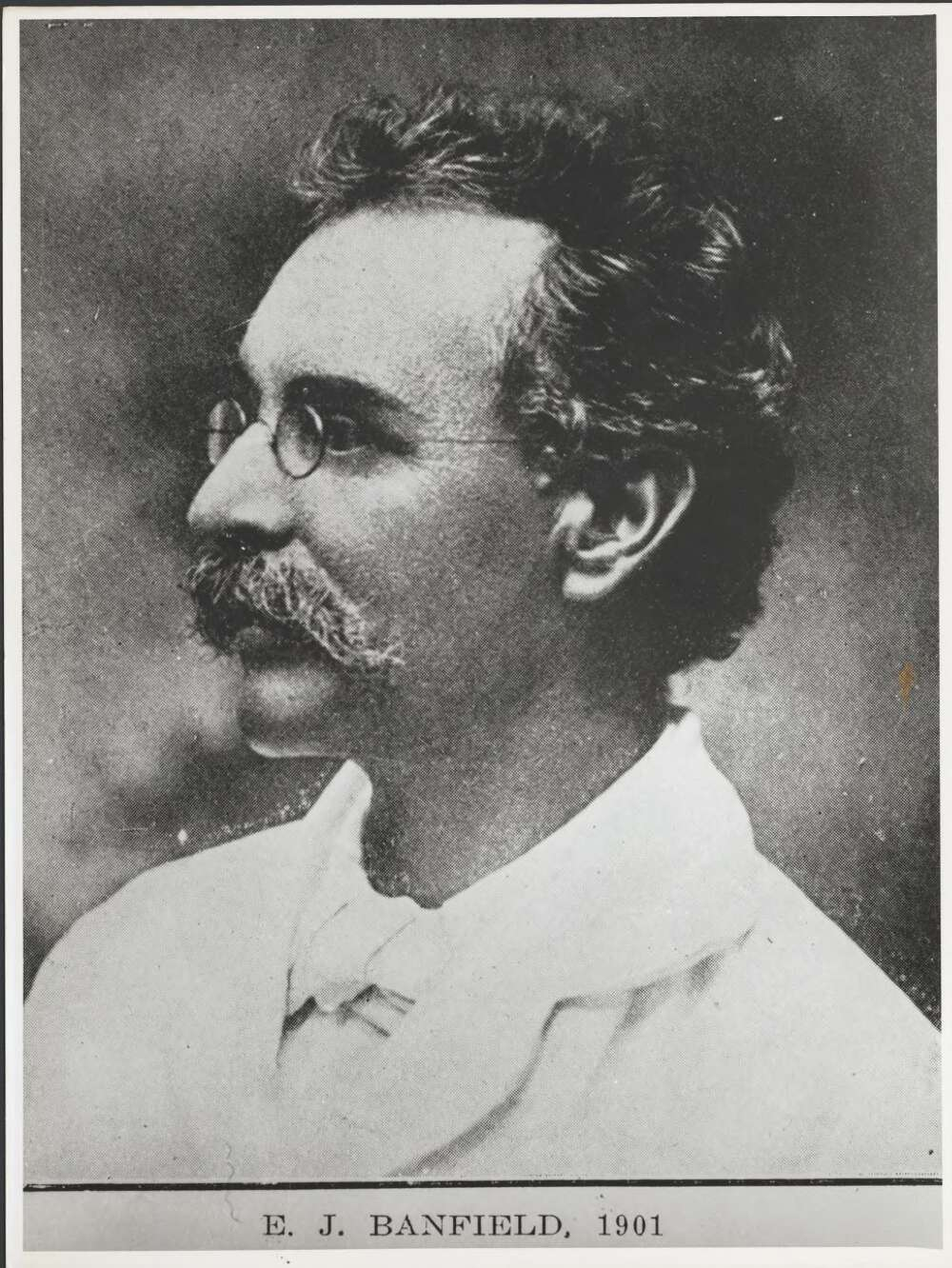
- Edmund James (Ted) Banfield, 1901
- Born: Edward James Banfield; 4 September 1852; Liverpool, England
- Died: 2 June 1923 (aged 70); Dunk Island, Queensland, Australia
- Spouse: Bertha Golding (1886–1923)
- Writing career
- Notable work: Confessions of a Beachcomber (1908)

Edmund James Banfield (4 September 1852 – 2 June 1923) was an author and naturalist in Queensland, Australia. He is best known for his book Confessions of a Beachcomber. His grave on Dunk Island is listed on the Queensland Heritage Register.

== Early life ==
Banfield was born in Liverpool, England the son of Jabez Walter Banfield (1820–1899), printer, and his wife Sarah Ann (née Smith). Banfield was brought while a boy to Australia by his father, who settled at Ararat, Victoria in 1852 and became proprietor of a newspaper, the Ararat Advertiser.

== Late life ==
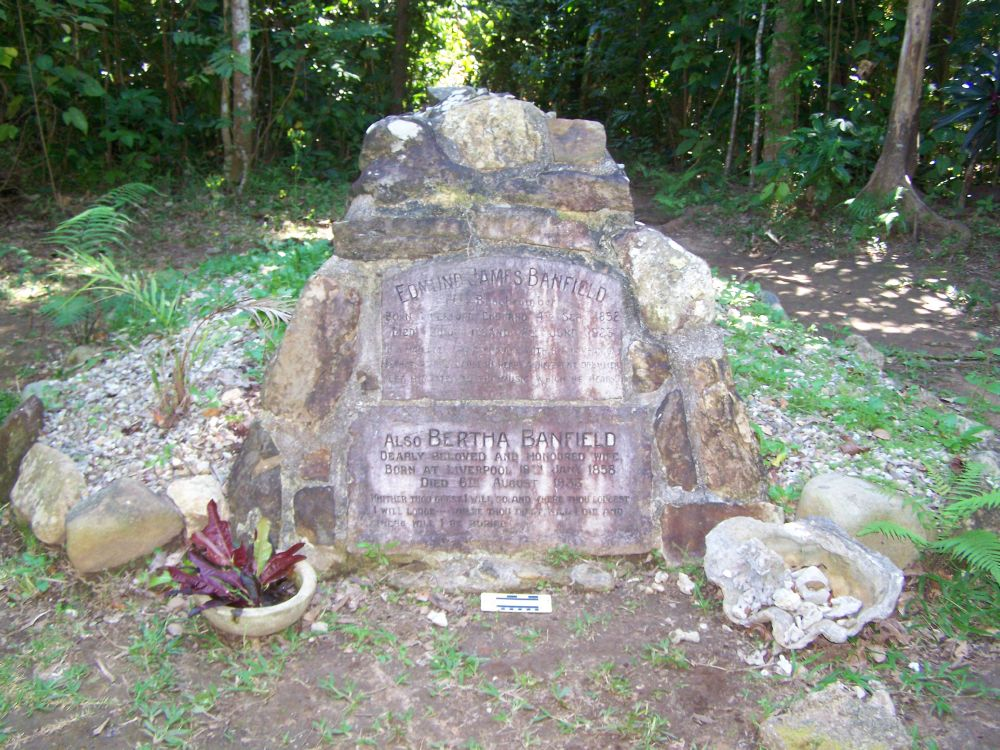
Banfield Memorial Reserve and Grave, 2008

Banfield described Dunk Island as his "Isle of Dreams—this unkempt, unrestrained garden where the centuries gaze upon perpetual summer". He became ill towards the end of May 1923 and died on 2 June 1923 of peritonitis. His wife survived him, there were no children. He was buried under a cairn on Dunk Island. His grave and the cairn are now listed on the Queensland Heritage Register as the Banfield Memorial Reserve and Grave.

== Sources ==
- Margriet R. Bonnin, 'Banfield, Edmund James (1852–1923)', Australian Dictionary of Biography, Volume 7, MUP, 1979, pp 165–166
- Serle, Percival (1949). "Banfield, Edmund James". Dictionary of Australian Biography. Sydney: Angus & Robertson.
