= Family Islands National Park =

National park in Queensland, Australia

- IUCN category II (national park)
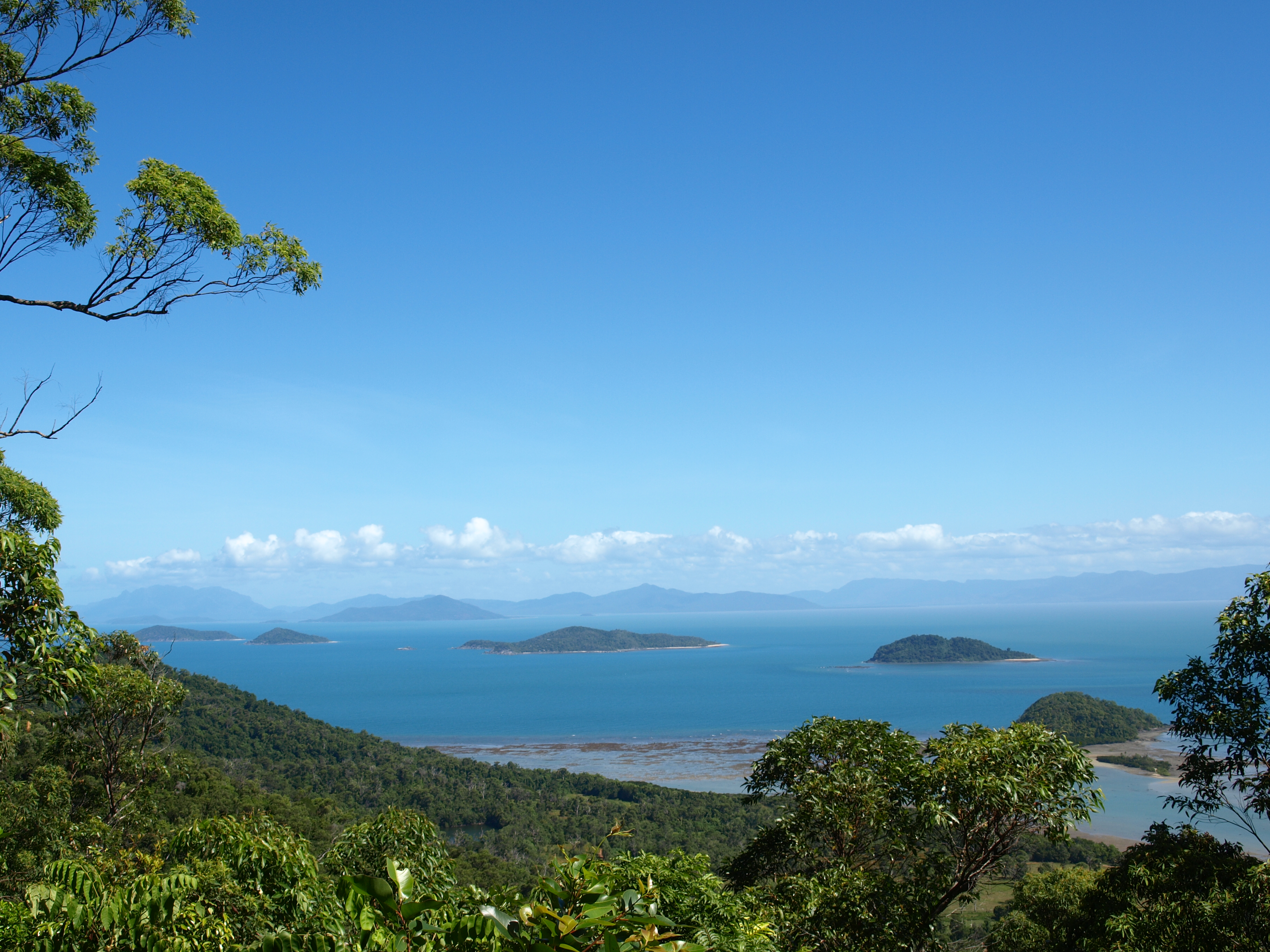
- View from Dunk Island

- Location within Queensland
- Location: Queensland
- Nearest city: Tully
- Coordinates: 17°55′33″S 146°08′07″E
- Area: 8.69 km^{2} (3.36 sq mi)
- Established: 1994
- Governing body: Queensland Parks and Wildlife Service
- Website: Official website

Family Islands National Park is an Australian national park in Queensland. It comprises the Family Islands, a group of continental islands lying a short distance off the coast, in the Cassowary Coast Region about midway between Cairns and Townsville, in Far North Queensland. Most of the area has been designated as part of the national park.

The islands were given their collective name and also English names by Captain Cook when he sailed through the area in 1770. They were part of the mainland until roughly 8,000 years ago when the sea level rose.

== The Islands ==
The largest of the Family Islands, their Aboriginal names, and their position in the "family" are:

- Dunk Island (Coonanglebah) – the father
- Richards Island (Bedarra) – the mother
- Wheeler Island (Toolgbar) and Coombe Island (Coomba) – the twins
- Smith Island (Kurrumbah), Bowden Island (Budjoo) and Hudson Island (Coolah) – the triplets.

There are also a number of smaller islands:

- Kumboola, which is connected to Dunk Island on particularly low tides
- Mound Island (Purtaboi), which is protected as a sea bird nesting habitat
- Woln Garin, a small island off Dunk Island's south east corner, known locally as "40ft Rock"
- Battleship Rock (Pee-Rahm-Ah), named because of its distinctive shape when seen from the north
- Thorpe Island (Ti mana), which is privately owned with one residence. This is the only Australian island which is owned freehold.

The European names of the islands reflect the names of the officers on board the survey ship HMS Paluma: Lieutenant G. Richards, commander; Lieutenants Wheeler, Combe and Bowden-Smith; Dr. Thorpe, surgeon; and Mr. Hudson, engineer.

== Facilities ==
Camp grounds are available on Dunk, Coombe and Wheeler Islands, with permits available from Queensland Parks and Wildlife. Resorts operate on Dunk and Bedarra Islands.

== See also ==
- Dunk Island
- Protected areas of Queensland
