= Dunk Island =

Dunk Island (Coonanglebah)
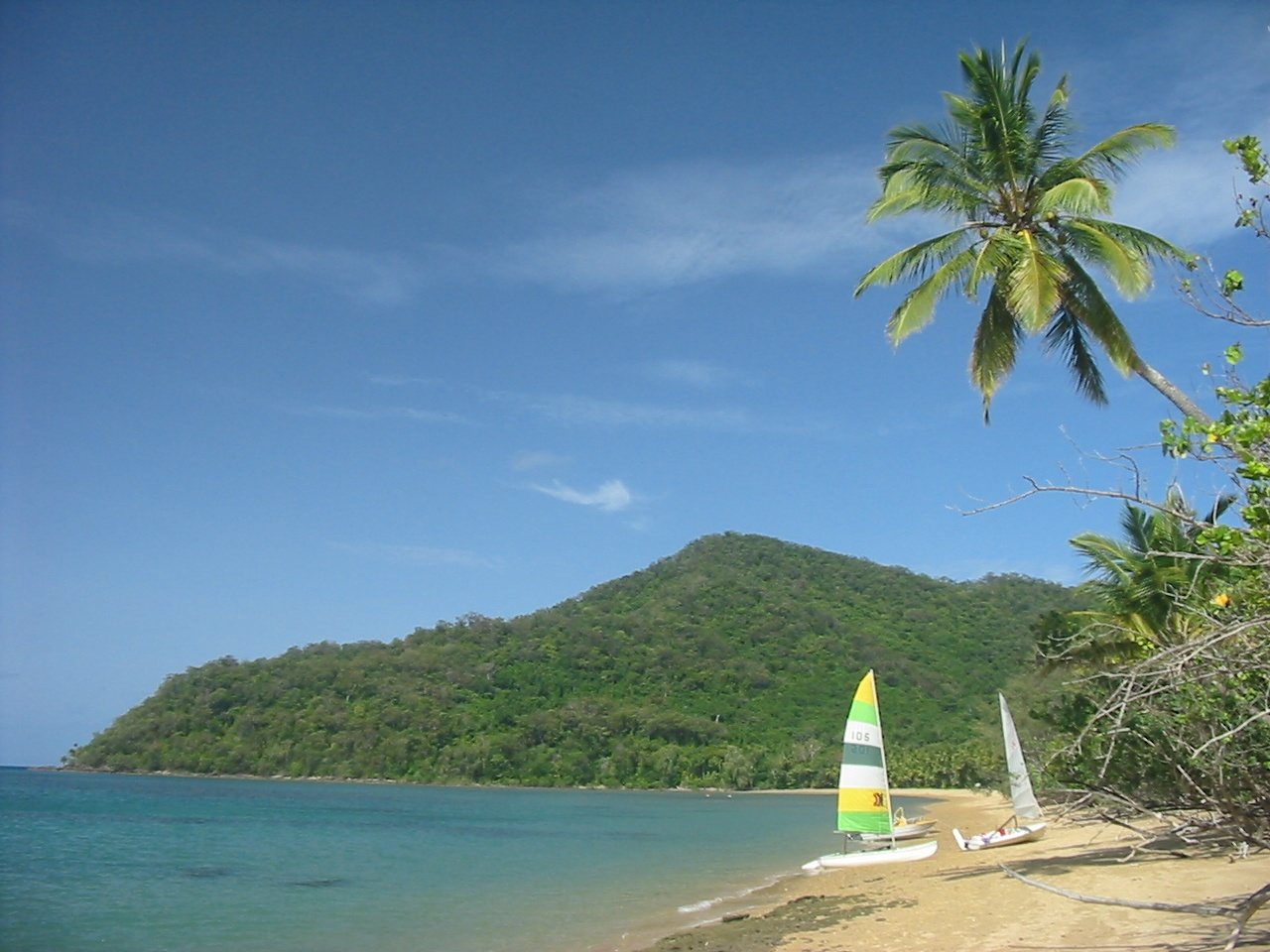
- Mount Kootaloo behind Brammo Bay

- Coordinates: 17.9453°S 146.1578°E
- Country: Australia
- State: Queensland

Government
  - State electorate: Hill
  - Federal division: Kennedy

Area
  - Total: 10 km^{2} (3.9 sq mi)

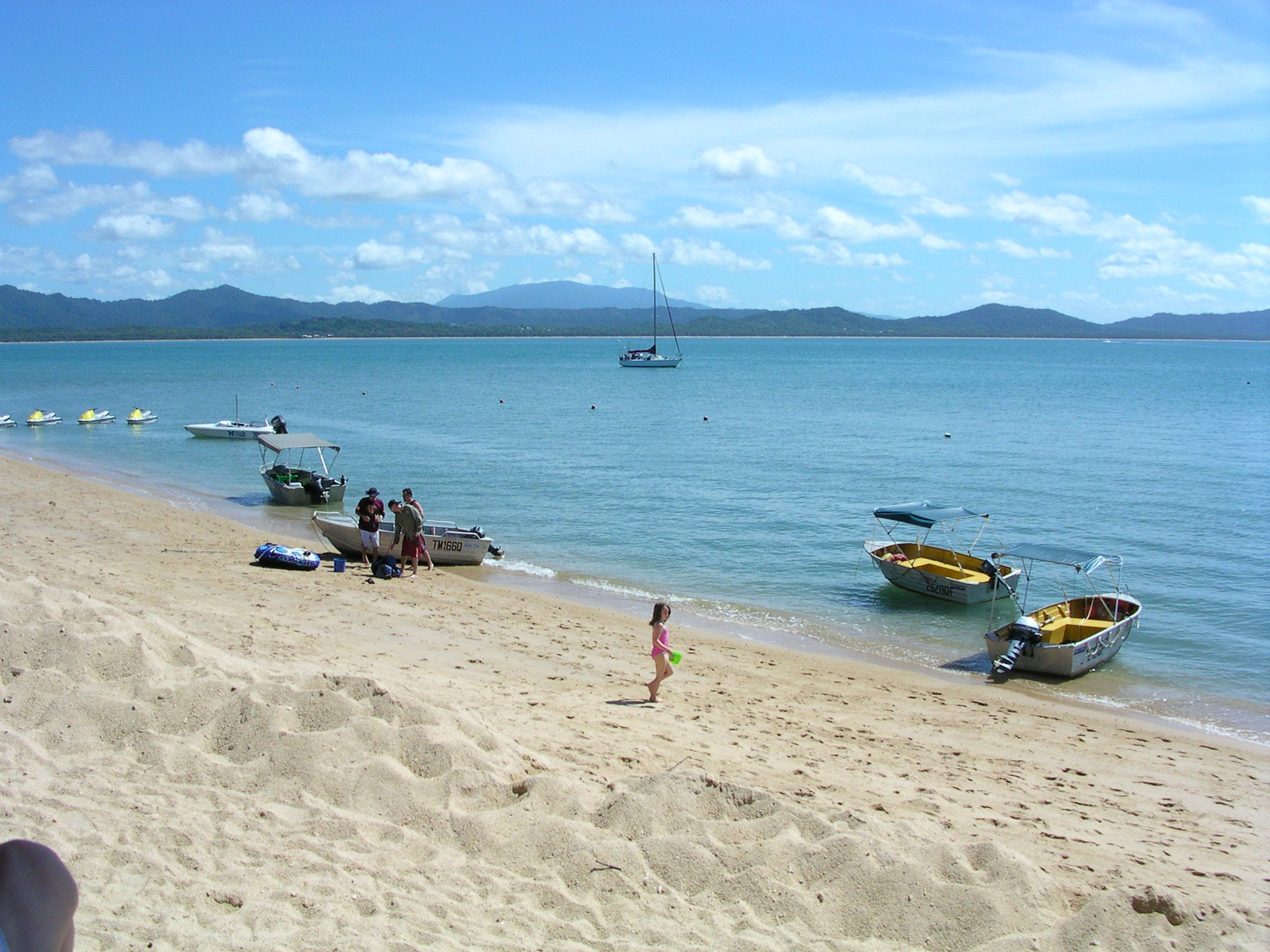
Beach at Dunk Island

Dunk Island, known as Coonanglebah in the Warrgamay and Dyirbal languages, is an island within the locality of Dunk in the Cassowary Coast Region, Queensland, Australia. It lies 4 kilometres (2.5 mi) off the Australian east coast, opposite the town of Mission Beach. The island in one of the Family Islands. Most of Dunk Island lies within the Family Islands National Park and in the larger Great Barrier Reef World Heritage Area.

The island is surrounded by reefs and has a diverse population of birds. The Bandjin and Djiru peoples once used the island as a source for food. Europeans first settled on the island in 1897. Dunk Island was used by the Royal Australian Air Force during World War II. In recent years the island and its resort facilities have been adversely affected by both Cyclone Larry and Cyclone Yasi.

== Geology and wildlife ==
Dunk Island is by far the largest island in the Family Islands National Park, all of which consist of granite rock. All of the islands were part of the mainland before the last sea level rise began 8,000 years ago. Dunk Island covers 970ha, of which 730 ha is national park and the rest is freehold. Its topography varies, with sandy beaches and rocky shores, slightly undulating slopes, foothills and steeper semi-rugged terrain. Mount Kootaloo is the island's highest point, at 271 m above sea level.

There are over 100 species of birds on Dunk Island, including rare and vulnerable seabirds. During the summer months, the island becomes a breeding site for terns and noddies. The lack of predators, along with a plentiful supply of food from the surrounding reef waters, make it an ideal nesting site. Dunk Island is also home to reptiles such as pythons, tree snakes, geckos and skinks. The island's fringing reefs and surrounding waters are home to an array of marine life such as sea turtles, dugongs, sharks, corals, fish, shellfish and crabs. Purtaboi Island (the small island directly out from Dunk Island) is closed and inaccessible for guests from October through to April each year due to the crested terns nesting on the island.

== History ==
=== Early history ===
The traditional Aboriginal owners of Dunk Island are the Bandjin and Djiru people, who have lived in this area for tens of thousands of years. After the sea level rise, they paddled to the islands in bark canoes to gather food and materials. The Warrgamay and Dyirbal name for Dunk Island is Coonanglebah, meaning "The Island of Peace and Plenty". It received its European name from James Cook, who sailed past it in the Endeavour on 8 June 1770. He noted that it was a "tolerable high island" and named it after George Montague-Dunk, 2nd Earl of Halifax (a former First Lord of the Admiralty).

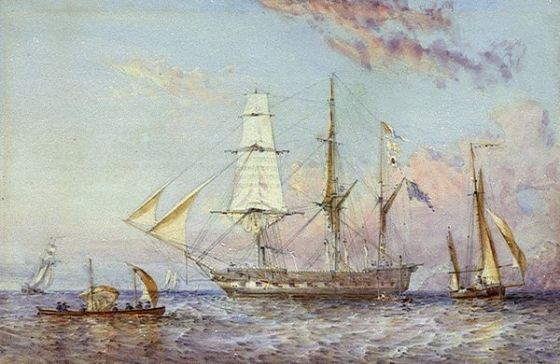
HMS Rattlesnake, painted by Sir Oswald Walters Brierly, 1853

Europeans settled the nearby mainland during the 19th century, seeking gold, timber and grazing land. In 1848, John MacGillivray studied the fauna and flora of the island while HMS Rattlesnake was anchored off the island for ten days. He subsequently wrote of its natural features in the Narrative of the Voyage of HMS Rattlesnake, published in England in 1852.

Dunk Island, eight or nine miles in circumference, is well wooded—it has two conspicuous peaks, one of which (the North-West one) is 857 feet in height. Our excursions were confined to the vicinity of the watering place and the bay in which it is situated. The shores are rocky on one side and sandy on the other, where a low point runs out to the westward. At their junction, and under a sloping hill with large patches of brush, a small stream of fresh water, running out over the beach, furnished a supply for the ship, although the boats could approach the place closely only at high-water.

— John MacGillivray, Narrative of the Voyage of HMS Rattlesnake

=== Edmund Banfield ===
In 1897, suffering from work anxiety and exhaustion, and advised by doctors that he had just six months to live, writer Edmund James Banfield moved to Dunk Island with his wife Bertha – so becoming the island's first white settlers. Previously a journalist and senior editor with the Townsville Bulletin for fifteen years, Banfield let the tranquillity of this unspoilt tropical paradise weave its magic and he lived on Dunk Island for the remaining 26 years of his life until his death in 1923.

A small hut built with the assistance of an Aborigine called Tom was the Banfields' first home. Over a period of time they cleared four acres of land for a plantation of fruit and vegetables. Combined with their chickens, cows and goats as well as the abundance of seafood and mangrove vegetation, they lived very self-sufficiently. Fascinated by Dunk Island's flora and fauna Banfield meticulously recorded his observations and went on to write a series of articles about island life under the pseudonym Rob Krusoe. He was further inspired to write a full-length book entitled Confessions of a Beachcomber (1908). The book became a celebrated text for romantics and escapists and established Dunk Island's reputation as an exotic island paradise.

In the ensuing years, Banfield wrote several other books about Dunk including My Tropical Isle (1911) and Tropic Days (1918). In these he shared the secrets of nature that he had uncovered and described the customs and legends of the Aboriginal people on the island. E. J. Banfield died on 2 June 1923 and his final book Last Leaves from Dunk Island was published posthumously in 1925. His widow remained on the island for another year before moving to Brisbane where she died, ten years after her husband. Today both are buried on the trail to Mt Kootaloo.

=== Commencement of the resort and World War II ===
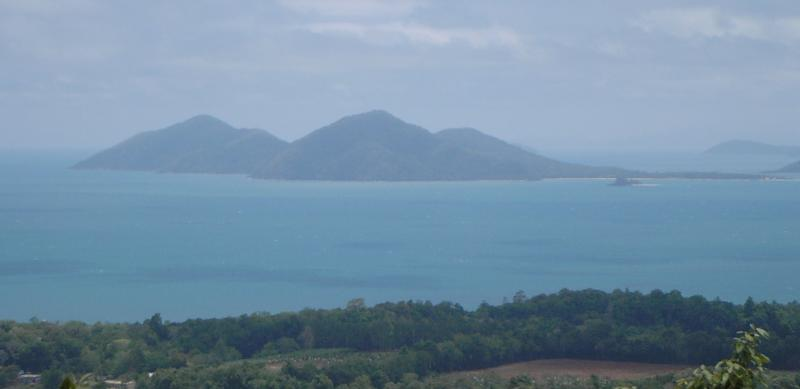
Dunk Island, photographed from Bicton Hill, towards the North of Mission Beach

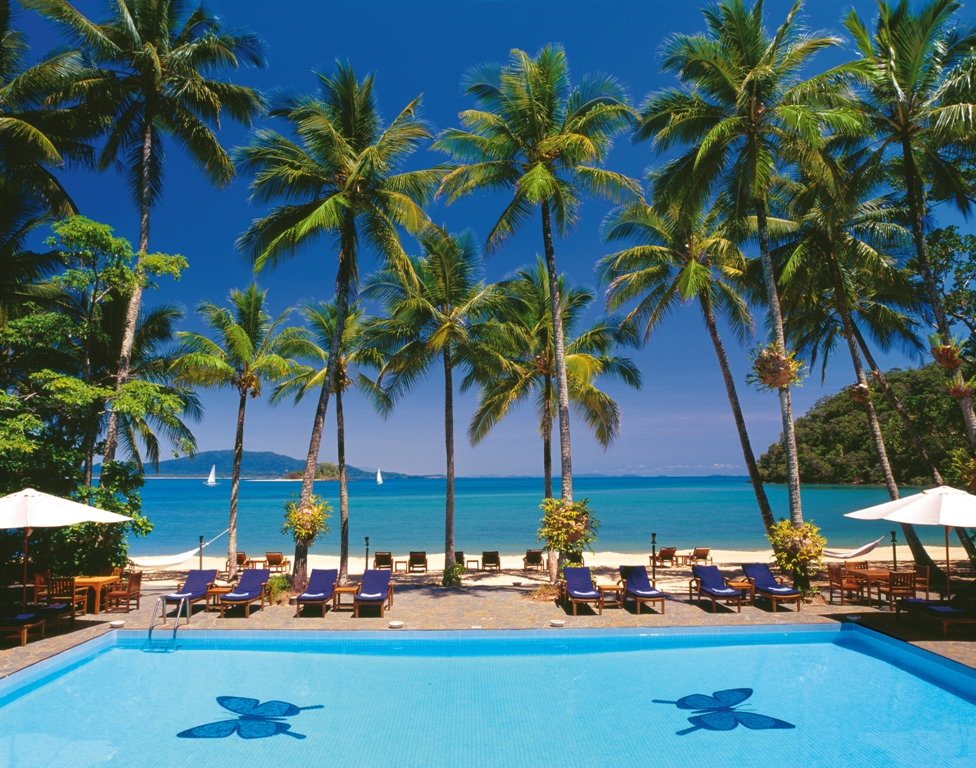
Butterfly Pool

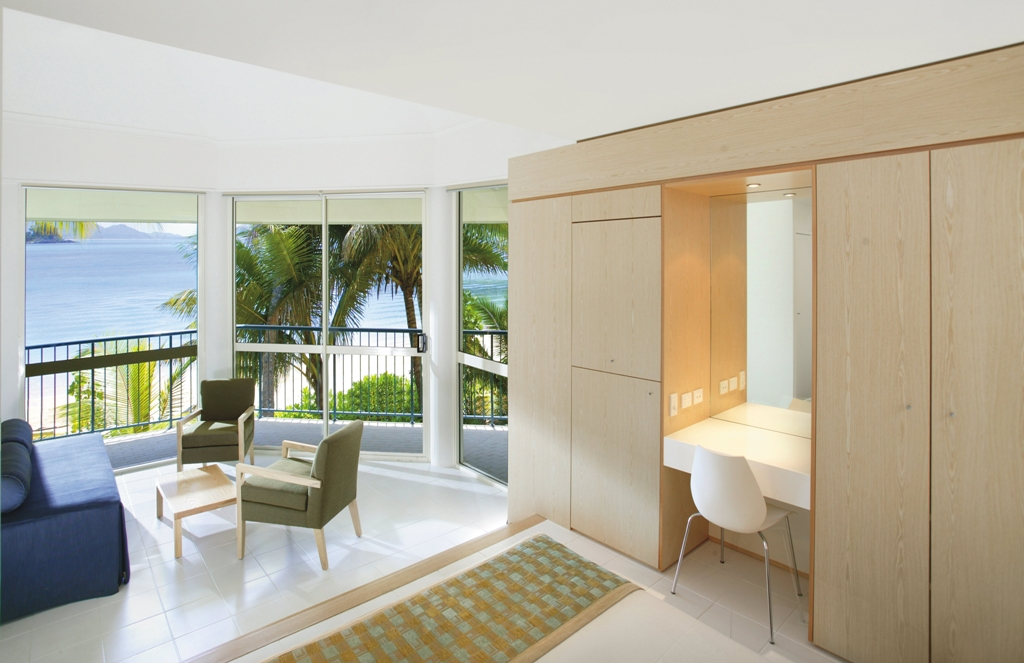
View of Brammo Bay from a beachfront room

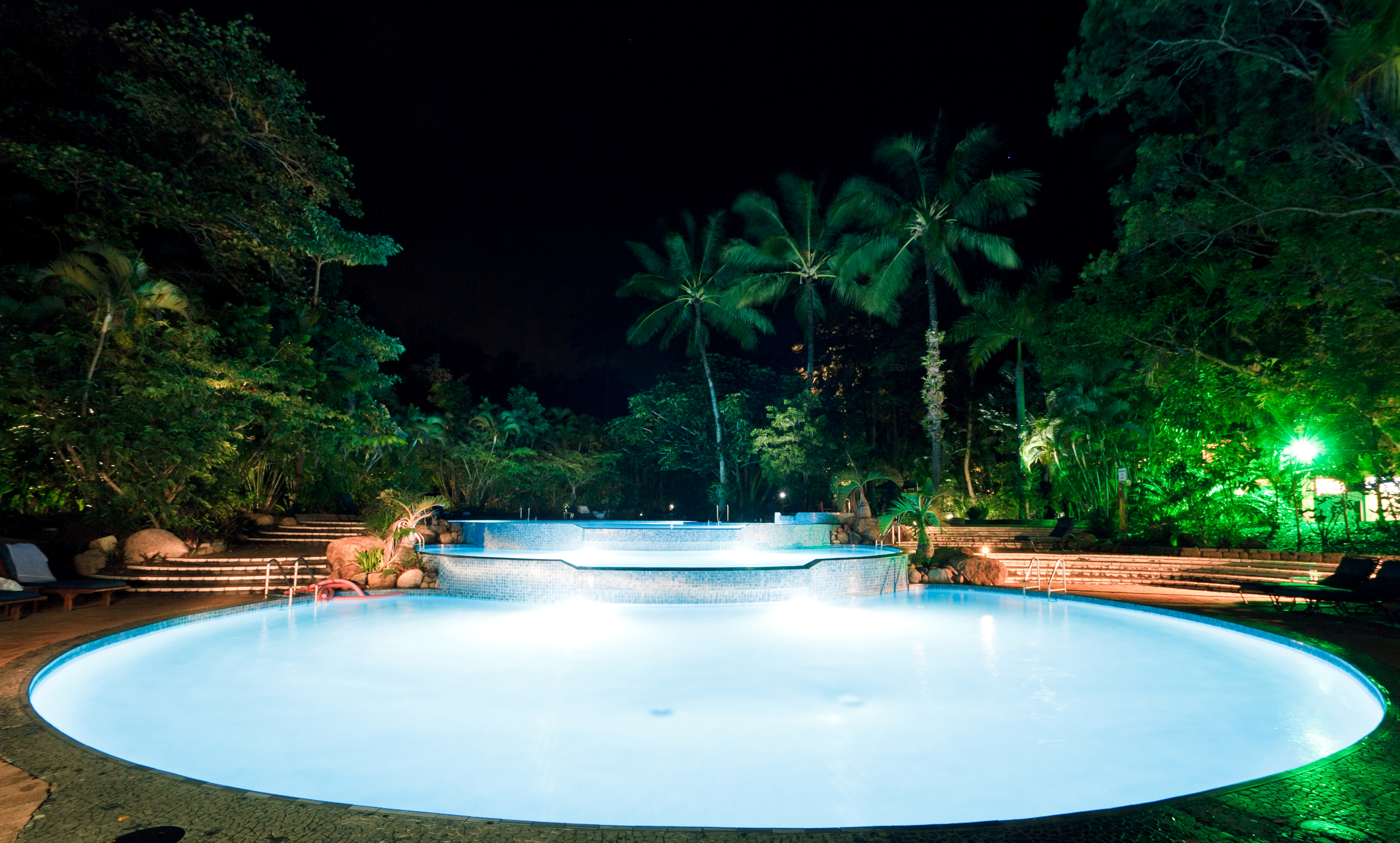
The heated cascade pool on Dunk Island

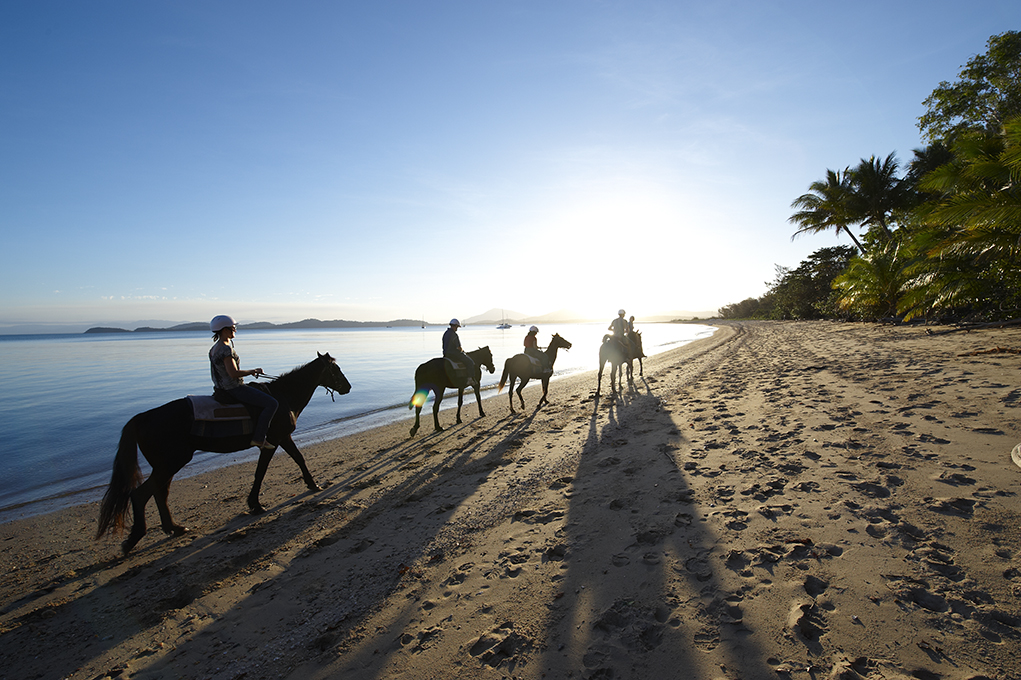
Sunset horse-riding on the beach

The island was bought in 1934 by Captain Brassey and Banfield's bungalow provided the basis for the beginnings of a resort. The resort was commenced in 1936. The Royal Australian Air Force occupied Dunk Island during World War II, building its airstrip in 1941. They installed a radar station on the island's highest point a year later, which was then dismantled when the war ended in 1945.

=== Post-war development of the resort ===
The Brassey family returned to run the resort for a period at the end of the war. The island then went through a succession of owners. In 1956, Gordon and Kathleen Stynes purchased it and relocated their family there from Victoria. They then redeveloped and upgraded the resort's facilities to establish the island as a tourist destination. As a result, Dunk Island became a popular destination for celebrities including Sean Connery, Henry Ford II, and Australian prime ministers Harold Holt and Gough Whitlam. The Stynes family owned and operated the island and resort until 1964, when it was sold to Eric McIlree, founder of Avis Car Rental.

In 1976, P&O and Trans Australia Airlines (TAA) purchased Dunk Island, each holding 50%. TAA took full ownership in July 1978. Ownership passed to Qantas in 1992, following its merger with Australian Airlines. In December 1997, the island was purchased by P&O, before being sold to Voyages Hotels & Resorts in July 2004. In September 2009, it was purchased by Hideaway Resorts.

=== Artists' colony ===
Dunk Island was also home to a small community of artists who lived, worked and showcased their work to many international and local visitors on a property on the southern side of the island. The colony was established in 1974 by former Olympic wrestler Bruce Arthur, who died at his home on Island in March 1998. The community continued to operate under resident metalsmith Susi Kirk until Cyclone Larry damaged much of the colony. Kirk continued to live at the colony until Cyclone Yasi destroyed her home in 2011, and has subsequently continued to live and work on Dunk Island as the last member of the artist colony.

=== After Cyclone Yasi, 2011–2022 ===
After Cyclone Yasi, Dunk Island was bought by Australian entrepreneur Peter Bond and redevelopment of the resort commenced in 2014. This redevelopment never took place.

In September 2019 Mayfair 101, an Australian family-owned investment conglomerate led by James Mawhinney, purchased Dunk Island. Mayfair 101 also secured over 250 properties on mainland Mission Beach as part of its estimated AUD1.6 billion 10–15-year plan to restore the region. Mayfair 101 was awarded the Dunk Island Spit tender on 14 November 2019 by the Cassowary Coast Regional Council, providing the opportunity for Mayfair 101 to negotiate a 30-year lease over the iconic Dunk Island Spit. The island's redevelopment is being undertaken by Mayfair 101's property division, Mayfair Iconic Properties, which has established a team based at Mission Beach to undertake the significant rejuvenation of the region.

In August 2020, the previous owners of the island, Family Islands Operations, owned by the family of Australian businessman Peter Bond repossessed the island after the owners Mayfair 101 failed to meet their payment obligations.

In 2021, numerous abandoned resort buildings were visible from the shore line with significant cyclone damage still visible. Windows were missing, roofs folded back, air conditioning units hanging from ceilings and plants growing inside the buildings.

=== 2022– ===
In July 2022, Annie Cannon-Brookes, wife of Atlassian founder and billionaire, Mike Cannon-Brookes, made a deal to buy Dunk Island. Reportedly, the transaction was between A$20–25m.

== Heritage listings ==
Dunk Island has a number of heritage-listed sites, including Banfield Memorial Reserve and Grave.

== Land use ==
=== National park ===
Dunk Island has thirteen kilometres of walking tracks spread over five main routes, ranging from a short walk to Edmund James Banfield's grave to a 4-hour island circuit hike. Commercial operators offer guided tours around the island, as does the Dunk Island resort.

=== Ferry ===
Access to Dunk Island is by passenger ferry from Mission Beach. Services operate several days each week, with schedules varying by season and weather conditions; the crossing takes around 10 minutes. In addition multiple operators provide private charters and tailored trips to Dunk Island and Bedarra Island. Vehicles are not permitted on the island, and advance booking is recommended during busy periods.

=== Resort ===
A resort on Dunk Island was first established in 1936, and it was especially popular among wealthy visitors in the 1960s. It was refurbished from the mid-1970s, and comprised 160 rooms popular with families and couples. The resort was devastated by Cyclone Yasi in 2011 and has been closed since that time. In September 2019 international investment conglomerate Mayfair 101 purchased the freehold of the island, including Dunk Island Resort, for AUD$31.5 million. The group has plans to redevelop the resort and improve facilities on the Dunk Island Spit.

=== Camping ground ===
Beachfront camping is available on the Dunk Island Spit, a short walk from Brammo Bay and several island walking tracks; the adjacent Sand Spit is a popular swimming area. Bookings are required and currently coordinated via Cassowary Coast Regional Council, with transfers to the island provided by scheduled ferries and private charters from Mission Beach. Campers are expected to be self-sufficient: there is no rubbish collection, pets are not permitted, and dangerous stinging jellyfish may be present in warmer months.

=== Artists' colony ===
The artists' colony has almost disappeared, though metalsmith Susi Kirk continues to live and work on Dunk Island as the last apparent member of the colony.

=== Airstrip ===
Dunk Island also has a small airstrip, Dunk Island Airport, located near the resort, which was used for frequent flights to Cairns.

=== Jetty ===
Dunk Island has a jetty which the ferry docks at to pick up and drop off passengers. This jetty can also be used for fishing and provides a view of the surrounding waters around the island.

== Climate ==
Dunk Island is located in the tropics and has an average maximum temperature of approximately 29 degrees Celsius (85 degrees Fahrenheit). The island is subject to tropical cyclones, and a history of cyclones affecting Dunk Island is included in Climatic Events below.

== Climatic events ==
=== Cyclone Larry ===
On 20 March 2006, Cyclone Larry's eye crossed the coast of Queensland at Innisfail as the Category 4. Around 160 staff members and 280 guests from Dunk Island had been evacuated to Cairns, but 20 Voyages staff stayed behind on the island. The resort suffered structural and water damage, but reopened on 1 July 2006 after an estimated $20 million of refurbishment and rebuilding.

=== Cyclone Yasi ===
Between AEST 23:57, 2 February 2011, and 00:27, 3 February 2011, the eye of Cyclone Yasi passed directly over Dunk Island as a Category 5 tropical cyclone. Mobile phone communication was lost due to the nearest base station at Mission Beach being destroyed and power lost at 22:00 as the cyclone approached. The resort was equipped with satellite phones and generators. Dunk Island Resort guests and some staff were flown to safety on 1 February 2011.

==== Impact on Dunk Island Resort staff ====
The 69 Dunk Island Resort staff and the general manager David Henry who were on the island at the time were forced into lockdown, four to a room, with rations that involved only a sandwich and an apple. Staff reported that they were not given the option to evacuate despite police asking the island's management to do so a week prior. Staff stated that the resort island's management told staff that they were required to stay and help with the clean-up, some were in fact required to return to work from the mainland as the cyclone approached including an employee who, reportedly, had sliced off part of their thumb in a boat accident. Staff reported that resort managers told them not to speak to the media. An unnamed Hideaway Resorts spokeswoman said, "They (staff) were given the choice to leave or stay and many chose to stay and bunker down".

Hideaway Resorts Director Andrew Menzies denied staff were forced to stay, but could not be evacuated because the cyclone tracked south late on 2 February 2011. Menzies was quoted as saying, "We followed cyclone procedures, there was never a forced evacuation communicated to anyone ... We have cyclone-rated buildings to a category 5, so this was actually the safest place to be". Rupert Greenhough from Hideaway Resorts said the island followed "established cyclone procedures", which did not include provision for mass evacuation of staff.

Hideaway Resorts CEO Mark Campbell and Director Andrew Menzies flew by helicopter to Dunk Island on 3 February 2011 to assess the damage. Chairman Rupert Greenhough expressed relief that staff had survived the cyclone and described that outcome as a testament to the planning and preparations undertaken.

On 4 February 2011, staff, other than a skeleton team, were stood down until the resort was to be rebuilt, evacuated from the island by helicopters and water taxis, and offered counselling.

The Herald Sun reported that when management became aware that journalists were on the island, they were ushered away from staff and directed to speak to the island's Melbourne-based co-owner and the manager of the resort.

On 5 February 2011, the Sunshine Coast Daily reported that statements purporting to cover Bedarra Resort released by management of Hideaway Resorts on 4 February 2011 actually referred to only its Dunk Island property that neighbours Bedarra Island.

==== Dunk Island Resort infrastructure damage ====
The damage to the resort was described as being very severe, with much of the resort needing to be completely rebuilt. The usually cyclone-hardy palm trees were stripped. The resort's pool was filled with sand from the storm surge, the function hall was gutted, and the health centre was unroofed. Almost all of the beachfront apartments had their walls torn off. The gardens of the resort were stripped bare.

In July 2012, the general manager of the island, David Henry, advised that restoration work was proceeding slowly, and the re-opening of the resort was not expected for at least eighteen months. The campsites and associated amenities blocks were expected to re-open in September 2012.

In the event, restoration was continually delayed. In late 2019, it was announced that international investment conglomerate Mayfair 101, headed by James Mawhinney, had purchased Dunk Island for a reported $31.5m, and said it would rebuild the resort with significantly expanded facilities.

== Education ==
There are no schools on Dunk Island. On the mainland, the nearest government primary school is Mission Beach State School in Wongaling Beach and the nearest government secondary school is Tully State High School in Tully. Distance education and boarding school are other alternatives.

== In popular culture ==
Dunk Island was the location for the 1969 film Age of Consent, which was based on a story by the artist and writer Norman Lindsay. Directed by Michael Powell, it starred James Mason as Bradley Morahan, a jaded Australian artist returning from New York, and Helen Mirren as Cora Ryan, a local teenager. Age of Consent attracted controversy over nudity and a sex scene, which led to some censorship and cuts. Much of the film was shot on the beach at Brammo Bay where ferries bringing visitors now dock.

An assignment in the penultimate round of the third season of the reality television show The Mole required the four remaining players to draw a rough map of Dunk Island. Contestants Marc Jongebloed and Bob Young won by submitting a drawing which roughly resembled the map of the island. One of the final scenes in James Cameron's movie Sanctum was shot on Muggy Muggy beach.

== See also ==
- Bedarra Island
- Great Barrier Reef
