= Pin Gin Hill, Queensland =

Pin Gin Hill
- Suburb
- Interactive map of Pin Gin Hill
- Coordinates: 17.5641°S 145.9519°E
- Country: Australia
- State: Queensland
- LGA: Cassowary Coast Region
- Location: 12.3 km (7.6 mi) SW of Innisfail; 91.0 km (56.5 mi) S of Cairns; 262 km (163 mi) NNW of Townsville; 1,613 km (1,002 mi) NNW of Brisbane

Government
  - State electorate: Hill
  - Federal division: Kennedy

Area
  - Total: 17.0 km^{2} (6.6 sq mi)

Population
  - Total: 191 (2021 census)
  - Density: 11.24/km^{2} (29.10/sq mi)
- Time zone: UTC+10:00 (AEST)
- Postcode: 4860
Suburbs around Pin Gin Hill
Ngatjan	Upper Daradgee	Stoters Hill; Bamboo Creek
Coorumba	Pin Gin Hill	Currajah
No 6 Branch	No 6 Branch	No 6 Branch

Pin Gin Hill is a rural locality in the Cassowary Coast Region, Queensland, Australia. In the 2021 census, Pin Gin Hill had a population of 191 people.

== Geography ==
The South Johnstone River forms the south-western and southern boundary of the locality, while the Johnstone River forms the north-western boundary.

Pin Gin Hill is in the east of the locality (17.5630°S 145.9552°E), rising to 184 metres (604 ft) above sea level.

The Palmerston Highway enters the locality from the north-east (Stoters Hill) and exits to the west (Coorumba).

The South Johnstone sugar mill operates a cane tramway route through the locality.

The land use is a mixture of grazing on native vegetation, growing sugarcane and other tropical crops, and some rural residential housing.

== Demographics ==
In the 2016 census, Pin Gin Hill had a population of 175 people.

In the 2021 census, Pin Gin Hill had a population of 191 people.

== Education ==
There are no schools in Pin Gin Hill. The nearest government primary schools are Mundoo State School in Wangan to the east and Goondi State School in Goondi Bend to the north-east. The nearest government secondary school is Innisfail State College in Innisfail Estate, Innisfail, to the north-east.
