= O'Briens Hill, Queensland =

O'Briens Hill
- Suburb
- Interactive map of O'Briens Hill
- Coordinates: 17.5175°S 145.9872°E
- Country: Australia
- State: Queensland
- LGA: Cassowary Coast Region
- Location: 8.2 km (5.1 mi) W of Innisfail; 87.0 km (54.1 mi) S of Cairns; 267 km (166 mi) NNW of Townsville; 1,629 km (1,012 mi) NNW of Brisbane

Government
  - State electorate: Hill
  - Federal division: Kennedy

Area
  - Total: 2.0 km^{2} (0.77 sq mi)

Population
  - Total: 11 (2021 census)
  - Density: 5.5/km^{2} (14.2/sq mi)
- Time zone: UTC+10:00 (AEST)
- Postcode: 4860
Suburbs around O'Briens Hill
Fitzgerald Creek	Fitzgerald Creek	Fitzgerald Creek
Upper Daradgee	O'Briens Hill	Goondi
Upper Daradgee	Stoters Hill	Belvedere

O'Briens Hill is a rural locality in the Cassowary Coast Region, Queensland, Australia. In the 2021 census, O'Briens Hill had a population of 11 people.

== Geography ==
The locality is bounded to the west, north-west, and north by the Johnstone River and to the east and south-east by the Palmerston Highway.

Stone Island is a 5.0-hectare (12-acre) island In the Johnstone River in the north of the locality (17.5033°S 145.9881°E).

Despite the "hill" in its name, the land is flat and low-lying, ranging from 0 to 10 metres (0 to 33 ft) above sea level. The land is a mixture of crop growing (sugarcane and bananas) and grazing on native vegetation.

== History ==
The locality was named after a pioneer family in the area.

== Demographics ==
In the 2016 census, O'Briens Hill had a population of 14 people.

In the 2021 census, O'Briens Hill had a population of 11 people.

== Education ==
There are no schools in O'Briens Hill. The nearest government primary school is Goondi State School in Goondi Bend to the east. The nearest government secondary school is Innisfail State College in Innisfail Estate to the east.
