= Vasa Views, Queensland =

Vasa Views
- Suburb
- Interactive map of Vasa Views
- Coordinates: 17.4702°S 145.9636°E
- Country: Australia
- State: Queensland
- LGA: Cassowary Coast Region
- Location: 12.4 km (7.7 mi) NW of Innisfail; 78.1 km (48.5 mi) S of Cairns; 272 km (169 mi) SSE of Townsville; 1,630 km (1,010 mi) NNW of Brisbane

Government
  - State electorate: Hill
  - Federal division: Kennedy

Area
  - Total: 8.3 km^{2} (3.2 sq mi)

Population
  - Total: 136 (2021 census)
  - Density: 16.39/km^{2} (42.4/sq mi)
- Time zone: UTC+10:00 (AEST)
- Postcode: 4860
Suburbs around Vasa Views
Waugh Pocket	Eubenangee	Garradunga
Ngatjan	Vasa Views	Daradgee
Ngatjan	Fitzgerald Creek	Fitzgerald Creek

Vasa Views is a rural locality in the Cassowary Coast Region, Queensland, Australia. In the 2021 census, Vasa Views had a population of 136 people.

== Geography ==
The Bruce Highway enters the locality from the east (Daradgee) and exits to the north (Eubenangee).

The land use is a mixture of crop growing (predominantly sugarcane), grazing on native vegetation, production forestry, and rural residential housing.

There is a cane tramway to transport the harvested sugarcane to the local sugar mill.

== Demographics ==
In the 2016 census, Vasa Views had a population of 132 people.

In the 2021 census, Vasa Views had a population of 136 people.

== Education ==
There are no schools in Vasa Views. The nearest government primary schools are Goondi State School in Goondi Bend, Innisfail, to the south-east and Mirriwinni State School in Mirriwinni to the north-west. The nearest government secondary school is Innisfail State College in Innisfail Estate, Innisfail.
