= Stoters Hill, Queensland =

Stoters Hill
- Suburb
- Interactive map of Stoters Hill
- Coordinates: 17.5355°S 145.9716°E
- Country: Australia
- State: Queensland
- LGA: Cassowary Coast Region
- Location: 7.9 km (4.9 mi) WSW of Innisfail; 86.6 km (53.8 mi) S of Cairns; 266 km (165 mi) NNW of Townsville; 1,615 km (1,004 mi) NNW of Brisbane

Government
  - State electorate: Hill
  - Federal division: Kennedy

Area
  - Total: 4.9 km^{2} (1.9 sq mi)

Population
  - Total: 97 (2021 census)
  - Density: 19.80/km^{2} (51.3/sq mi)
- Time zone: UTC+10:00 (AEST)
- Postcode: 4860
Suburbs around Stoters Hill
Upper Daradgee	O'Briens Hill	Belvedere
Upper Daradgee	Stoters Hill	Hudson
Pin Gin Hill	Pin Gin Hill	Bamboo Creek

Stoters Hill is a rural locality in the Cassowary Coast Region, Queensland, Australia. In the 2021 census, Stoters Hill had a population of 97 people.

== Geography ==
The locality is bounded to the west and north-west by the Johnstone River.

The Palmerston Highway enters the locality from the north-east (O'Briens Hill / Belvedere) and exits to the south (Pin Gin Hill).

== Demographics ==
In the 2016 census, Stoters Hill had a population of 113 people.

In the 2021 census, Stoters Hill had a population of 97 people.

== Education ==
There are no schools in Stoters Hill. The nearest government primary school is Goondi State School in Goondi Bend to the north-east. The nearest government secondary school is Innisfail State College in Innisfail Estate, Innisfail, to the north-east. There are also non-government schools in Innisfail and its suburbs.
