= Ngatjan =

- Suburb
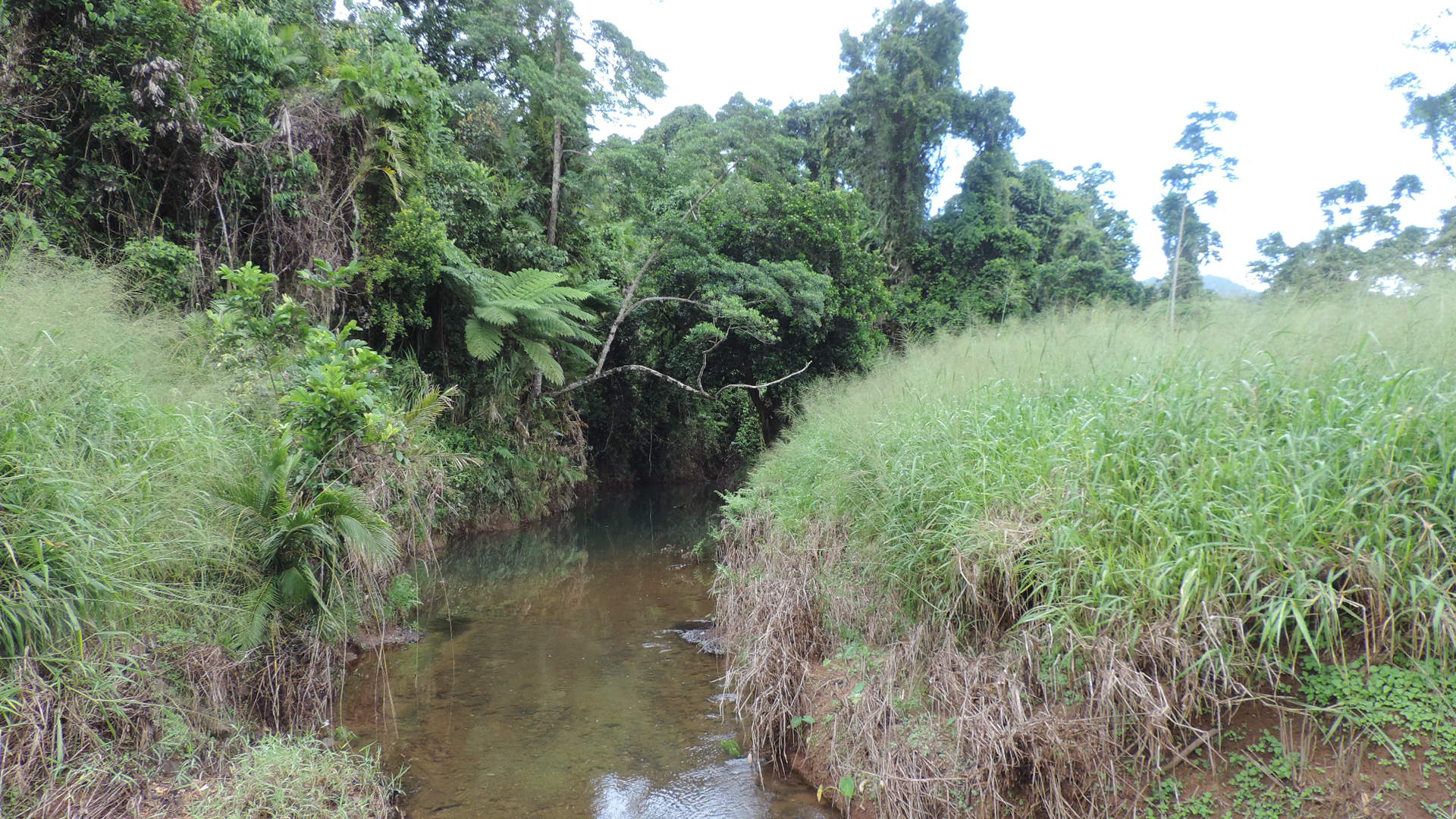
- Canal Creek, flowing through Ngatjan to Waugh Pocket, 2018

- Interactive map of Ngatjan
- Coordinates: 17.5127°S 145.9019°E
- Country: Australia
- State: Queensland
- LGAs: Cassowary Coast Region; Cairns Region
- Location: 15.4 km (9.6 mi) W of Innisfail; 91.5 km (56.9 mi) S of Cairns; 274 km (170 mi) NNW of Townsville; 1,630 km (1,010 mi) NNW of Brisbane

Government
  - State electorate: Hill
  - Federal division: Kennedy

Area
  - Total: 58.2 km^{2} (22.5 sq mi)

Population
  - Total: 0 (2021 census)
  - Density: 0.000/km^{2} (0.000/sq mi)
- Time zone: UTC+10:00 (AEST)
- Postcode: 4860
Suburbs around Ngatjan
Woopen Creek	Waugh Pocket	Vasa Views
Wooroonooran	Ngatjan	Fitzgerald Creek
Nerada	Cooroo Lands; Coorumba	Upper Daradgee; Pin Gin Hill

Ngatjan is a rural locality split between the Cassowary Coast Region and the Cairns Region, Queensland, Australia. In the 2021 census, Ngatjan had "no people or a very low population".

== Geography ==
The split between the local government areas approximates the drainage divide with the northern part of the locality in the Cairns Region draining into the Russell River (Suez Creek being the principal watercourse within the northern part of the locality) and with the southern part of the locality in the Cassowary Coast Region draining into the North Johnstone River (Waraker Creek being the principal watercourse within the southern part of the locality).

The locality is mountainous terrain ranging from 20 metres above sea level (in the Suez Creek valley) through to peaks such as Mount Mirinjo (390 metres), Cooroo Peak (430 metres) and Chalmynia Mountain (400 metres).

The only road through Ngatjan is the Cooroo Lands Road which traverses the southern part of the locality connecting the locality of Cooroo Lands (which is cut off to the south by the Johnstone River) to Upper Daradgee from where there are connections through to the Bruce Highway at Fitzgerald Creek.

The land in the centre and north of locality is within the Wooroonooran National Park (part of the Wet Tropics World Heritage Area). Outside of the national park in the south of the locality, the land use is residential with other minimal use.

== History ==
The name is derived from the ethnonym of the local Ngatjan people.

== Demographics ==
In the 2016 census, Ngatjan had "no people or a very low population".

In the 2021 census, Ngatjan had "no people or a very low population".

== Education ==
There are no schools in Ngatjan. The nearest government primary school is Goondi State School in Goondi Bend to the north-east. The nearest government secondary school is Innisfail State College in Innisfail Estate to the north-east. There are also a number of non-government schools in Innisfail and its suburbs.
