= Cooroo Lands, Queensland =

Cooroo Lands
- Suburb
- Interactive map of Cooroo Lands
- Coordinates: 17.5238°S 145.8986°E
- Country: Australia
- State: Queensland
- LGA: Cassowary Coast Region
- Location: 19.2 km (11.9 mi) W of Innisfail; 95.3 km (59.2 mi) S of Cairns; 278 km (173 mi) NNW of Townsville; 1,634 km (1,015 mi) NNW of Brisbane

Government
  - State electorate: Hill
  - Federal division: Kennedy

Area
  - Total: 5.6 km^{2} (2.2 sq mi)

Population
  - Total: 0 (2021 census)
  - Density: 0.00/km^{2} (0.00/sq mi)
- Time zone: UTC+10:00 (AEST)
- Postcode: 4860
Suburbs around Cooroo Lands
Ngatjan	Ngatjan	Ngatjan
Ngatjan	Cooroo Lands	Ngatjan
Nerada	Nerada	Ngatjan

Cooroo Lands is a rural locality in the Cassowary Coast Region, Queensland, Australia. In the 2021 census, Cooroo Lands had "no people or a very low population".

== Geography ==
The Johnstone River forms the southern boundary of the locality, entering from the south-west (Ngatjan / Nerada) and exiting to the south-east (Ngatjan / Nerada). Coccolah Island is a 2.4-hectare (5.9-acre) island (17.5328°S 145.9126°E) in the river just prior to its exit to the south-east.

Road access to the locality is via Cooroo Lands Road from Ngatjan.

The land use is a mixture of grazing on native vegetation and crop growing (mostly bananas).

== Demographics ==
In the 2016 census, Cooroo Lands had "no people or a very low population".

In the 2021 census, Cooroo Lands had "no people or a very low population".

== Education ==
There are no schools in Cooroo Lands. The nearest government primary school is Goondi State School in Goondi Bend to the east. The nearest government secondary school is Innisfail State College in Innisfail Estate to the east. There are also a number of non-government schools in Innisfail and its suburbs.
