= Eubenangee, Queensland =

Eubenangee
- Suburb
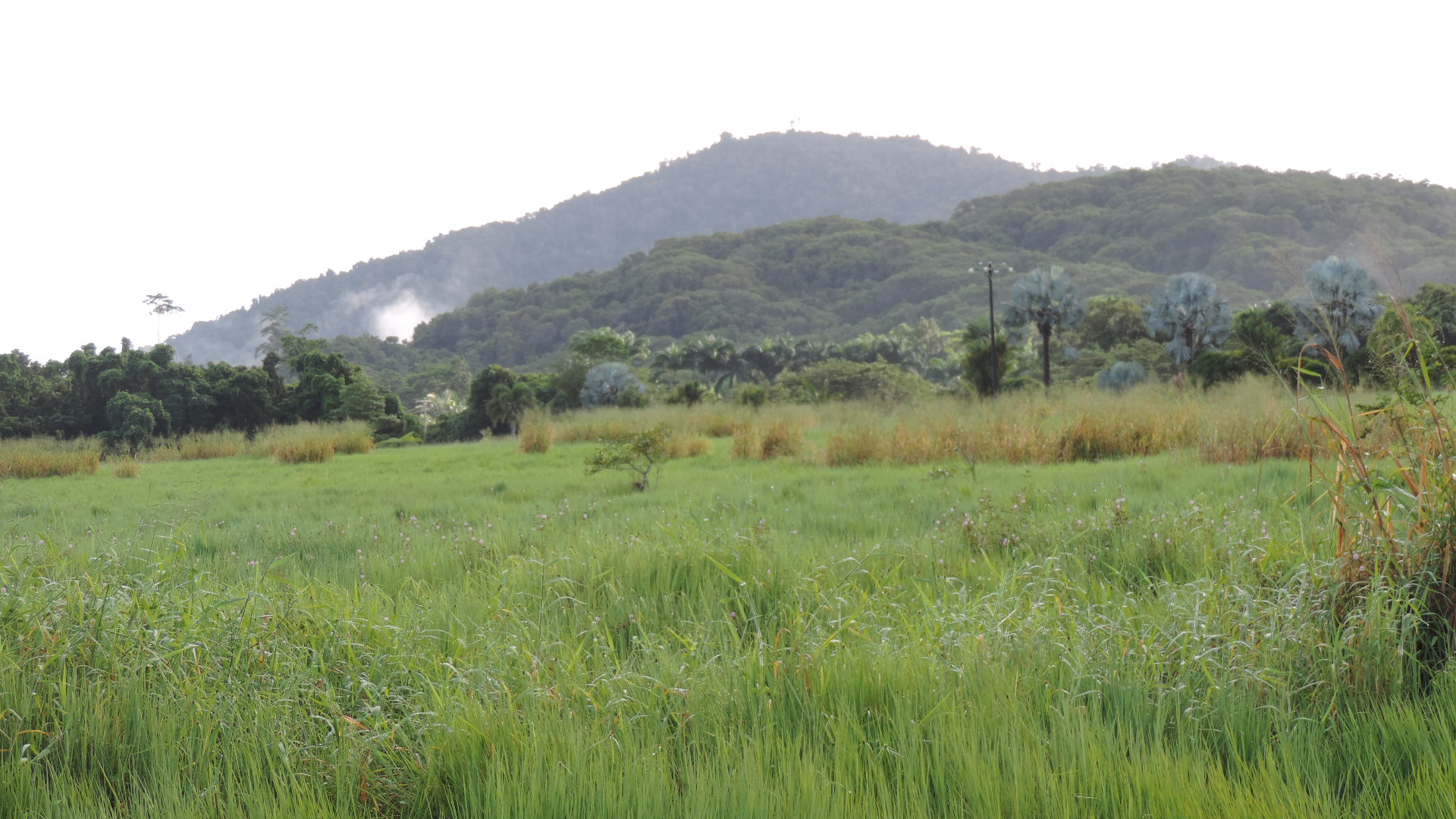
- Looking north over fields from Cartwright Road, Eubenangee, 2018

- Interactive map of Eubenangee
- Coordinates: 17.4133°S 145.9963°E
- Country: Australia
- State: Queensland
- LGAs: Cairns Region; Cassowary Coast Region
- Location: 14.7 km (9.1 mi) N of Queensland; 21.7 km (13.5 mi) SE of Babinda; 79.8 km (49.6 mi) S of Cairns; 1,605 km (997 mi) NNW of Brisbane

Government
  - State electorate: Hill
  - Federal division: Kennedy

Area
  - Total: 91.4 km^{2} (35.3 sq mi)

Population
  - Total: 247 (2021 census)
  - Density: 2.702/km^{2} (6.999/sq mi)
- Postcode: 4860
Suburbs around Eubenangee
Mirriwinni	East Russell; Bramston Beach	Coral Sea
Bartle Frere; Woopen Creek	Eubenangee	Wanjuru
Waugh Pocket	Vasa Views; Garradunga	Jubilee Heights

Eubenangee is a coastal locality split between the Cairns Region and the Cassowary Coast Region, Queensland, Australia. In the 2021 census, Eubenangee had a population of 247 people.

== Geography ==
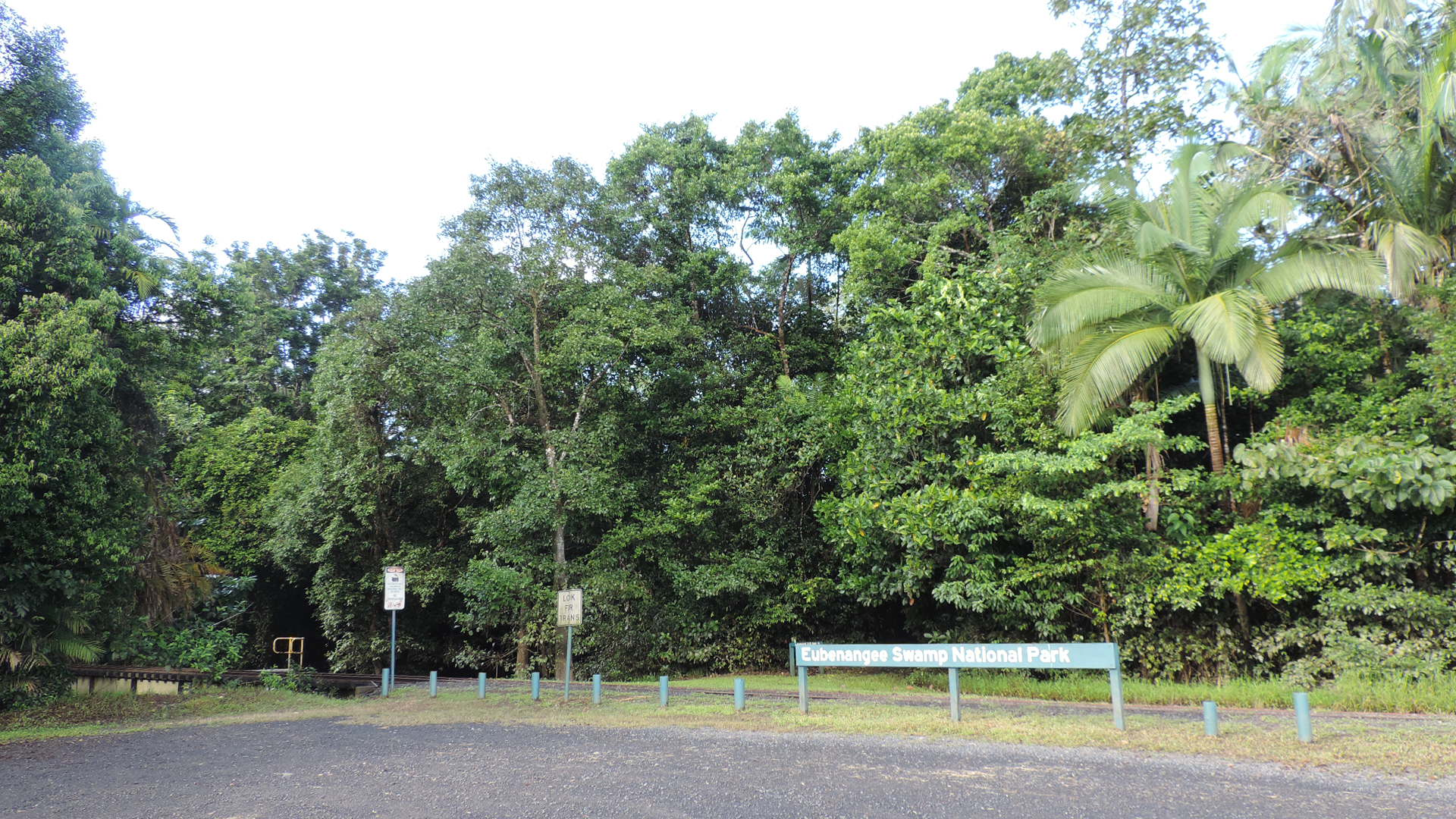
Eubenangee Swamp National Park with cane tramway and bridge passing in front of it, 2018

The larger northern part of the locality (85.9 square kilometres (33.2 mi^{2})) is in Cairns Region with the smaller southern part (5.5 square kilometres (2.1 mi^{2})) in the Cassowary Coast Region. The western part of the locality is very low-lying undeveloped wetland (approx 10 metres above sea level) and forms part of the Eubenangee Swamp National Park. In contrast the north-eastern part of the locality is mountainous undeveloped land rising to Mount Arthur (470 metres above sea level), part of being in the Ella Bay National Park. The developed land is mostly on the fringes of the Eubenangee Swamp National Park; it is mostly used for crop farming with sugarcane predominating.

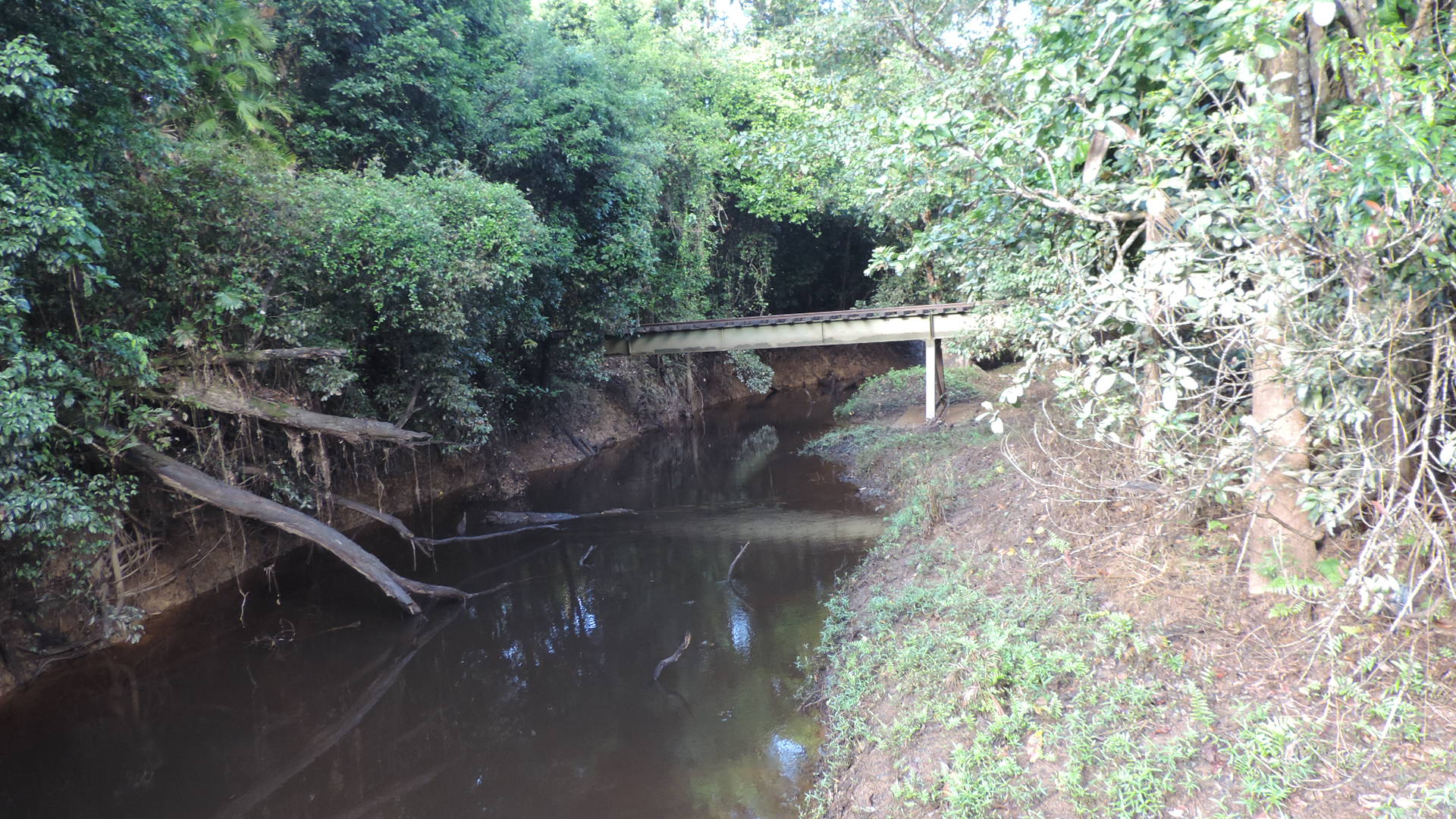
Sugarcane tramway bridge crossing the Alice River (tributary of the Russell River) at the Eubenangee Swamp National Park, 2018

Eubenangee is a watershed with the northern part of the locality draining towards the Russell River (which enters the Coral Sea between Deeral and East Russell) and the southern part of the locality draining towards the North Johnstone River (which having merged with the South Johnstone River into the Johnstone River enters the Coral Sea between Flying Fish Point and Coquette Point).

The Bruce Highway and North Coast railway passes through the south-east of the locality with the Waugh railway station serving the area. A cane tramway passes through the locality to take harvested sugarcane to the local sugar mills.

== History ==
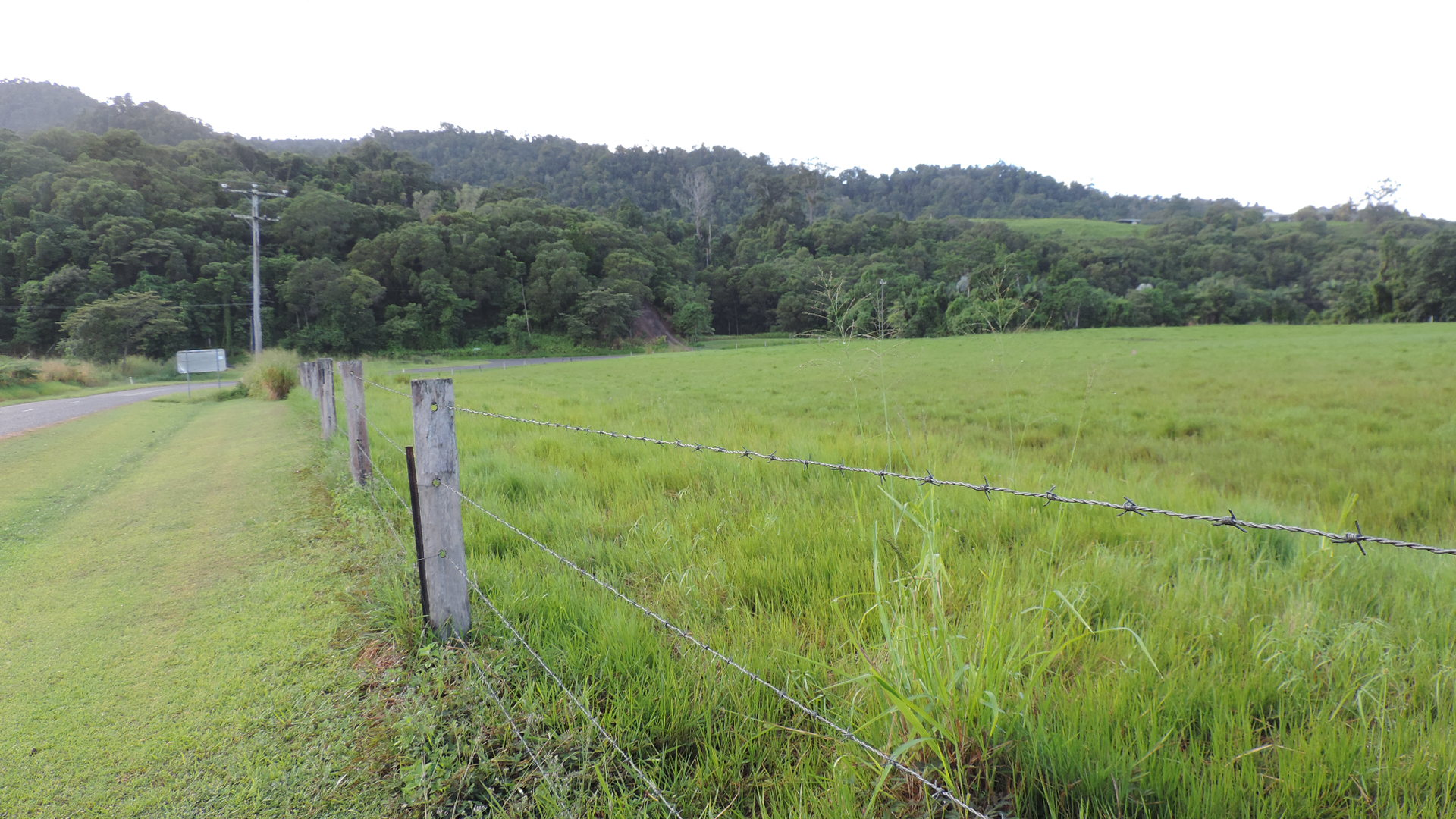
Looking east along Cartwright Road, Eubenangee, 2018

The locality takes its name from the railway station name assigned by the Queensland Railways Department on 15 August 1918. In turn the railway station took its name from the extensive Eubenangee Swamp.

Eubenangee Provisional School opened in September 1921. In 1927 it became Eubenangee State School. It closed in 1971.

== Demographics ==
In the 2016 census, the population of Eubenangee was 242 people.

In the 2021 census, Eubenangee had a population of 247 people.

== Education ==
There are no schools in Eubenangee. The nearest government primary schools are Mirriwinni State School in neighbouring Mirriwinni to the north-east and Goondi State School in Goondi Bend to the south-west. The nearest government secondary schools are Babinda State School (Prep-12) in Babinda to the north-west and Innisfail State College in Innisfail Estate to the south-east.
