= Belvedere, Queensland =

Belvedere
- Suburb
- Interactive map of Belvedere
- Coordinates: 17.5249°S 145.9861°E
- Country: Australia
- State: Queensland
- LGA: Cassowary Coast Region
- Location: 5.7 km (3.5 mi) W of Innisfail; 84.4 km (52.4 mi) S of Cairns; 265 km (165 mi) NNW of Townsville; 1,623 km (1,008 mi) NNW of Brisbane

Government
  - State electorate: Hill
  - Federal division: Kennedy

Area
  - Total: 2.1 km^{2} (0.81 sq mi)

Population
  - Total: 943 (2021 census)
  - Density: 449/km^{2} (1,163/sq mi)
- Time zone: UTC+10:00 (AEST)
- Postcode: 4860
Suburbs around Belvedere
O'Briens Hill	Goondi	Hudson
O'Briens Hill	Belvedere	Hudson
Stoters Hill	Hudson	Hudson

Belvedere is a rural locality in the Cassowary Coast Region, Queensland, Australia. In the 2021 census, Belvedere had a population of 943 people.

== Geography ==
Belvedere is a low-lying locality (approx 10–20 metres (35–65 ft) above sea level) to the east of the Johnstone River. The Palmerston Highway forms the western boundary of the locality, joining the Bruce Highway at the northern tip of the locality. There is some suburban housing in the north-west and east of the locality with other areas used for farming crops including sugarcane.

== History ==
The name Belvedere was the name of the land development project and became the locality name on 2 June 1984. The name was chosen because the estate had good views just like a belvedere.

== Demographics ==
In the 2016 census Belvedere had a population of 907 people.

In the 2021 census, Belvedere had a population of 943 people.

== Education ==
There are no schools in Belvedere. The nearest government primary school is Goondi State School in Goondi Bend to the east. The nearest government secondary school is Innisfail State College in Innisfail Estate to the east.
