= Fitzgerald Creek, Queensland =

Fitzgerald Creek
- Suburb
- Interactive map of Fitzgerald Creek
- Coordinates: 17.495°S 145.9741°E
- Country: Australia
- State: Queensland
- LGA: Cassowary Coast Region
- Location: 7.1 km (4.4 mi) NW of Innisfail; 83.2 km (51.7 mi) SSE of Cairns; 266 km (165 mi) NNW of Townsville; 1,616 km (1,004 mi) NNW of Brisbane

Government
  - State electorate: Hill
  - Federal division: Kennedy

Area
  - Total: 12.6 km^{2} (4.9 sq mi)

Population
  - Total: 98 (2021 census)
  - Density: 7.78/km^{2} (20.14/sq mi)
- Time zone: UTC+10:00 (AEST)
- Postcode: 4860
Suburbs around Fitzgerald Creek
Vasa Views	Vasa Views	Daradgee
Ngatjan	Fitzgerald Creek	Goondi
Upper Daradgee	O'Briens Hill	Goondi

Fitzgerald Creek is a rural locality in the Cassowary Coast Region, Queensland, Australia. In the 2021 census, Fitzgerald Creek had a population of 98 people.

== Geography ==
The Johnstone River bounds the locality to the south-east and east.

== Demographics ==
In the 2011 census, Fitzgerald Creek had a population of 195 people.

In the 2016 census, Fitzgerald Creek had a population of 81 people.

In the 2021 census, Fitzgerald Creek had a population of 98 people.

== Education ==
There are no schools in Fitzgerald Creek. The nearest government primary school is Goondi State School in Goondi Bend to the south-east. The nearest government secondary school is Innisfail State College in Innisfail Estate to the east. There are also non-government schools in Innisfail and its suburbs.
