= Woopen Creek =

- Suburb
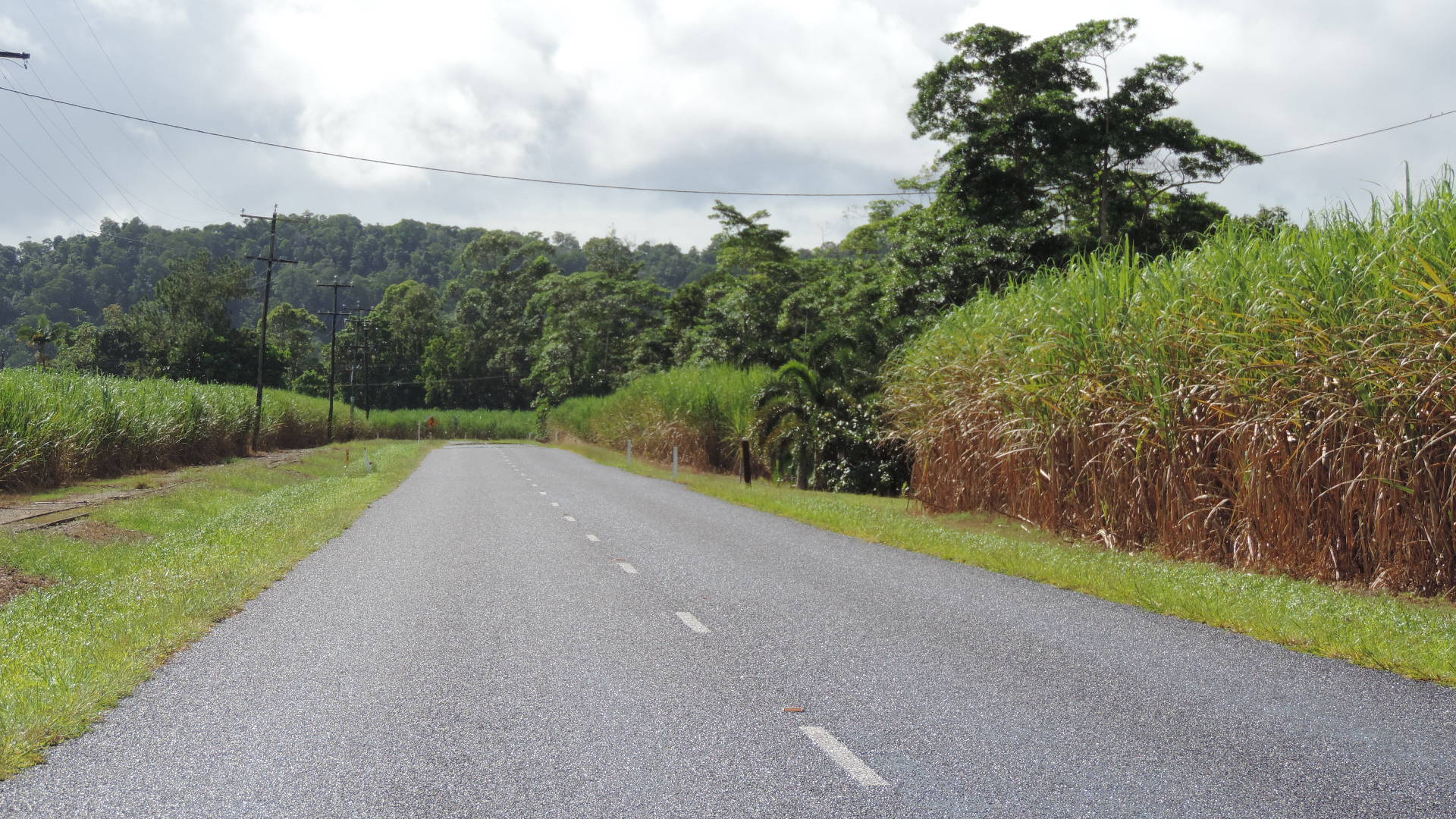
- Woopen Creek Road, Woopen Creek, 2018

- Interactive map of Woopen Creek
- Coordinates: 17.4727°S 145.8758°E
- Country: Australia
- State: Queensland
- LGA: Cairns Region
- Location: 18.8 km (11.7 mi) SSW of Babinda; 27.6 km (17.1 mi) WNW of Innisfail; 76.9 km (47.8 mi) S of Cairns; 287 km (178 mi) NNW of Townsville; 1,622 km (1,008 mi) NNW of Brisbane

Government
  - State electorate: Hill
  - Federal division: Kennedy

Area
  - Total: 26.7 km^{2} (10.3 sq mi)
- Elevation: 10–404 m (33–1,325 ft)

Population
  - Total: 135 (2021 census)
  - Density: 5.056/km^{2} (13.10/sq mi)
- Time zone: UTC+10:00 (AEST)
- Postcode: 4871
Suburbs around Woopen Creek
Wooroonooran	Bartle Frere	Eubenangee; Waugh Pocket
Wooroonooran	Woopen Creek	Ngatjan
Wooroonooran	Ngatjan	Ngatjan

Woopen Creek is a rural locality in the Cairns Region, Queensland, Australia. In the 2021 census, Woopen Creek had a population of 135 people.

== Geography ==
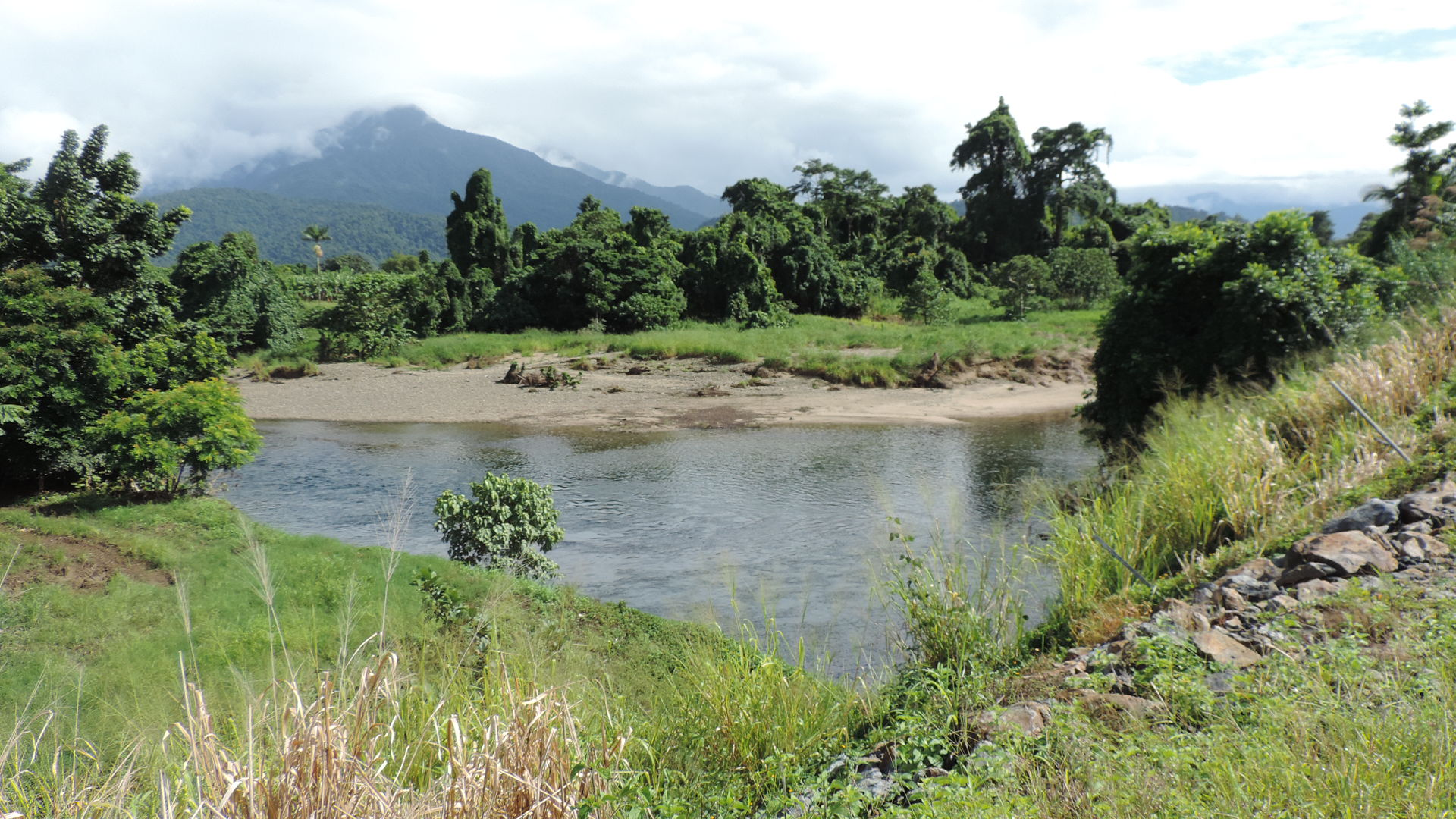
Russell River, boundary between Woopen Creek (foreground) and Bartle Frere (background), 2018

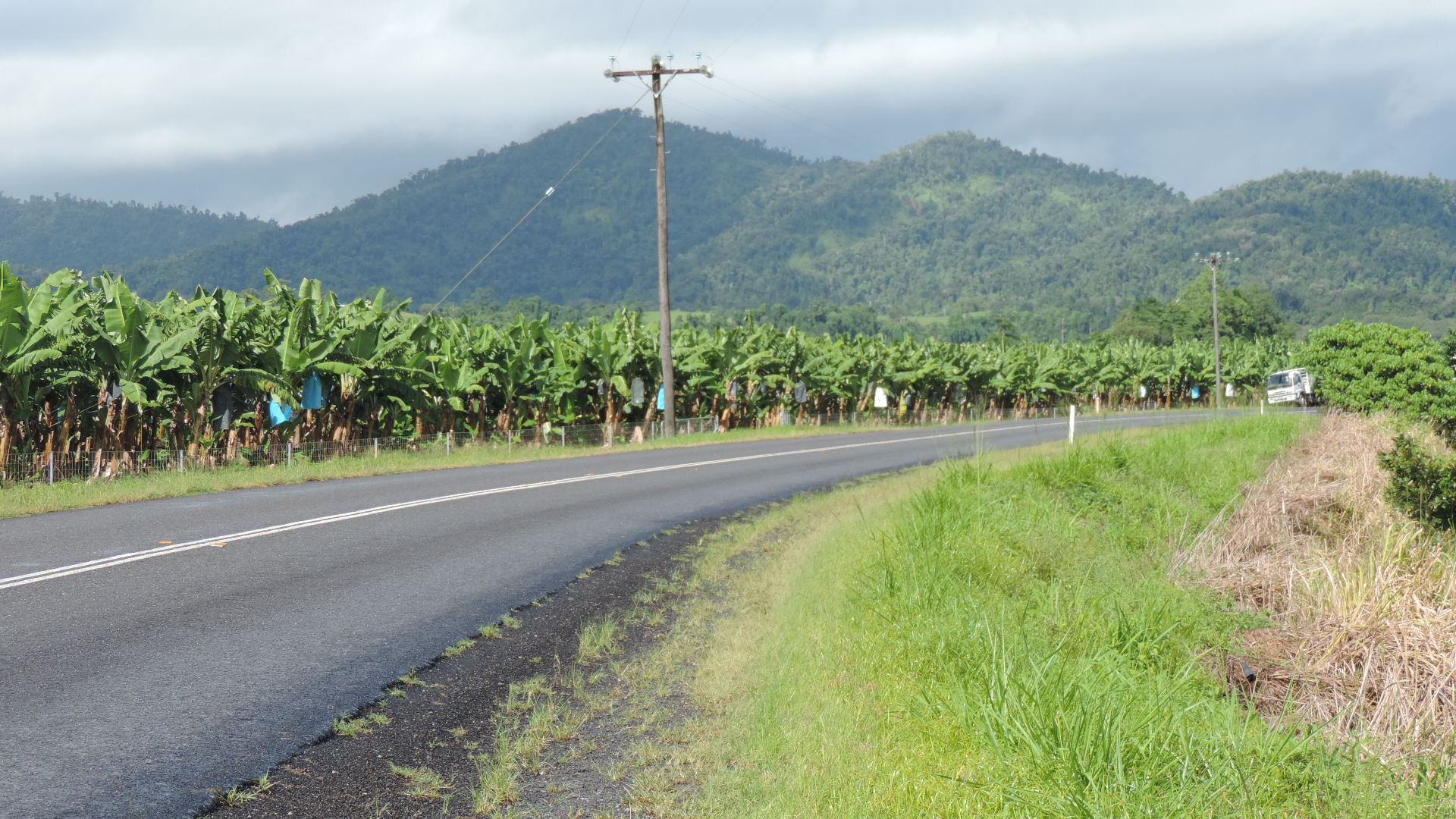
Banana farming along Woopen Creek Road, Woopen Creek, 2018

The Russell River forms the northern boundary of the locality while mountainous regions form its other boundaries. There are two flatter valleys formed by Woopen Creek in the southern part of locality and Vorris Creek in the northern part of the locality. Although the land is predominantly freehold, only the flatter valleys are developed for use for agriculture while the more mountainous areas remain undeveloped. The principal agricultural use is growing sugarcane and bananas.

Although the Bruce Highway does not pass through the locality,

Mount Mirinjo (17.505°S 145.8638°E) in the Francis Range is in the southernmost part of locality, close to the boundary with Ngatjan. It is 404 metres (1,325 ft) above sea level compared with approximately 10 metres (33 ft) above sea level at the northernmost part of the locality.

== History ==
By 1940, residents of Woopen Creek had agitated for some years to have a school in their district. In November 1941 tenders were called to erect the school. However, the school was not built at this time, probably because the fear of a Japanese invasion in 1942 resulted in the closure of schools in coastal areas and reserving all construction materials exclusively for military purposes. In March 1951 residents made another attempt to establish a school at Woopen Creek. In 1951 the Queensland Government decided relocate the school building from Nerada State School (which closed in 1945) to establish Woopen Creek State School. The school opened on 4 February 1952. It closed on 8 December 1967.

In 2005 the Broken Nose Vanilla farm was established, an example of a wider trend of diversifying the agriculture of the Cairns region.

== Demographics ==
In the 2016 census, Woopen Creek had a population of 141 people.

In the 2021 census, Woopen Creek had a population of 135 people.

== Education ==
There are no schools in Woopen Creek. The nearest government primary schools are Bartle Frere State School in neighbouring Bartle Frere to the north and Mirriwinni State School in Mirriwinni to the north-east. The nearest government secondary school is Babinda State School (Prep-12) in Babinda to the north-east.
