= Daradgee, Queensland =

Daradgee
- Town
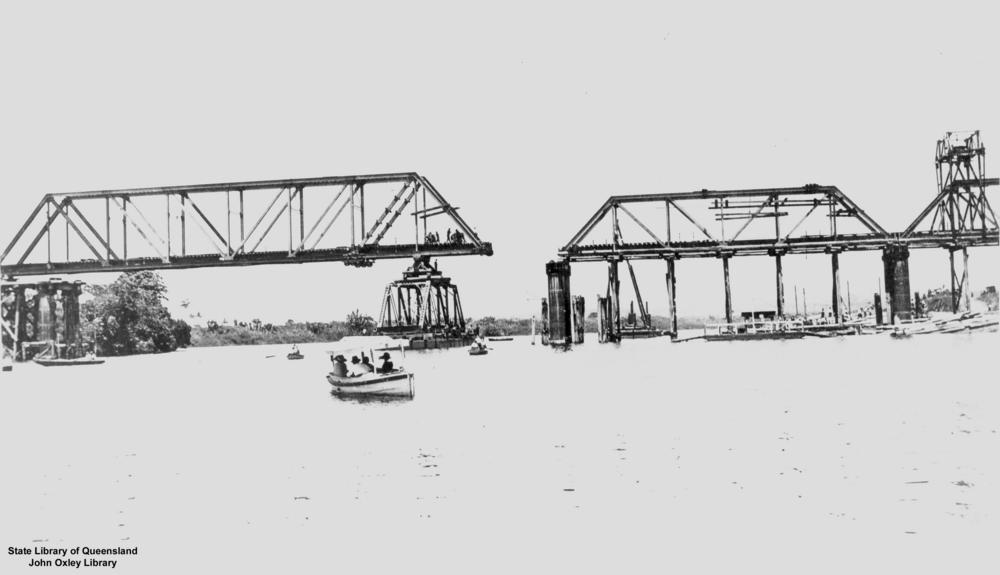
- Daradgee railway bridge under construction, 1924

- Interactive map of Daradgee
- Coordinates: 17.4875°S 146.0063°E
- Country: Australia
- State: Queensland
- LGA: Cassowary Coast Region
- Location: 11.4 km (7.1 mi) NNW of Innisfail; 82.5 km (51.3 mi) SSE of Cairns; 271 km (168 mi) NNW of Townsville; 1,602 km (995 mi) NNW of Brisbane

Government
  - State electorate: Hill
  - Federal division: Kennedy

Area
  - Total: 9.7 km^{2} (3.7 sq mi)

Population
  - Total: 90 (2021 census)
  - Density: 9.3/km^{2} (24.0/sq mi)
- Time zone: UTC+10:00 (AEST)
- Postcode: 4860
Localities around Daradgee
Garradunga	Garradunga	Jubilee Heights
Vasa Views	Daradgee	Jubilee Heights
Fitzgerald Creek	Goondi	Sundown

Daradgee is a rural town and locality in the Cassowary Coast Region, Queensland, Australia. In the 2021 census, the locality of Daradgee had a population of 90 people.

== Geography ==
The locality is bounded in the south-east by the Johnstone River. Victory Creek flows through the locality; it is a tributary of the Johnstone River at 17.4876°S 146.0034°E. Alligator Point is a point immediately across the river from the mouth of Victory Creek where the river has a sharp bend (17.4889°S 146.0030°E).

The land is relatively flat and low-lying (approx 10 metres above sea level) and is used for cropping including sugarcane and bananas.

The Bruce Highway runs through the south-west corner of the locality while the North Coast railway line runs from south to north through the locality. There is a cane tramway to deliver harvested sugarcane to the local sugar mills.

== History ==
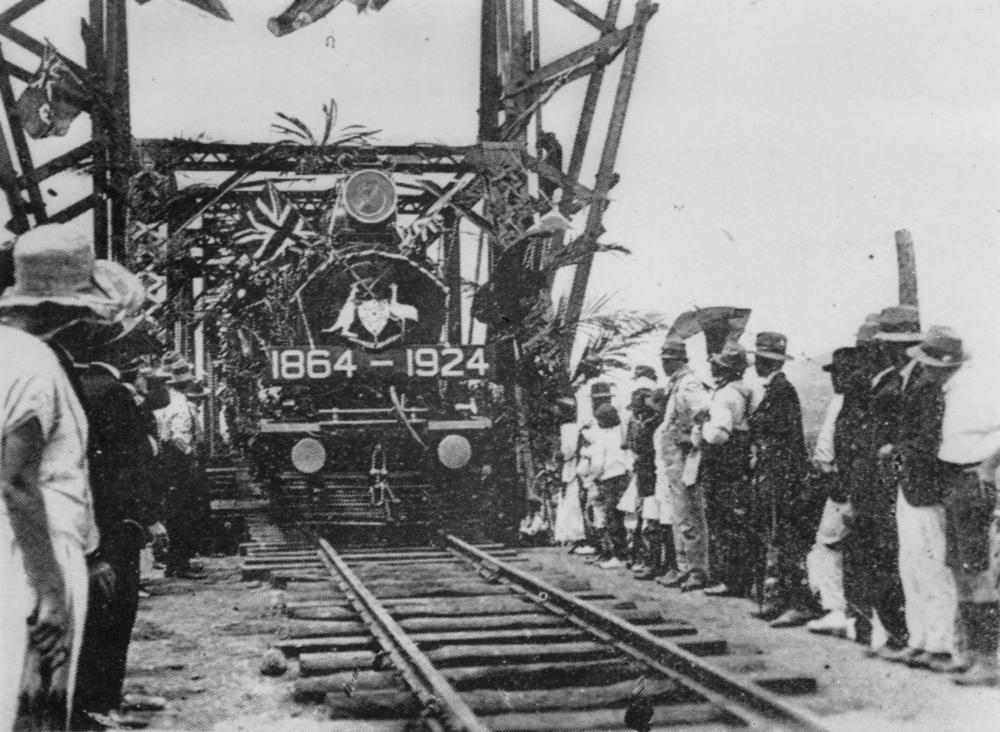
Opening of the Daradgee Bridge over the Johnstone River for the railway link between Townsville and Cairns, 1924

The town name is a corruption of the original township name Daraji (used from 1905 to 1918) based on an Aboriginal word meaning burial ground.

Daradgee Provisional School opened on 10 July 1911. In 1915 it became Daradgee State School. It closed on 14 December 1984.

The final section of the North Coast railway line was the bridge at Daradgee across the Johnstone River. The bridge was opened on 8 December 1924, by the Queensland Premier, Ted Theodore, enabling rail travel from Cairns to Brisbane and from there to as far as Perth in Western Australia. The bridge is listed on the Cassowary Coast Local Heritage Register.

== Demographics ==
In the 2016 census, the locality of Daradgeehad a population of 74 people.

In the 2021 census, the locality of Daradgee had a population of 90 people.

== Education ==
Daradgee Environmental Education Centre is a special purpose facility at McAvoy Street (17.4866°S 146.0053°E). It operates on the site of the former Daradgee State School using some of its buildings.

There are no mainstream schools in Daradgee. The nearest government primary schools are Goondi State School in Goondi Bend to the south and Innisfail State School in Innisfail to the south-east. The nearest government secondary school is Innisfail State College in Innisfail Estate to the south-east. There are Catholic primary and secondary schools in Innisfail.
