= East Palmerston, Queensland =

East Palmerston
- Suburb
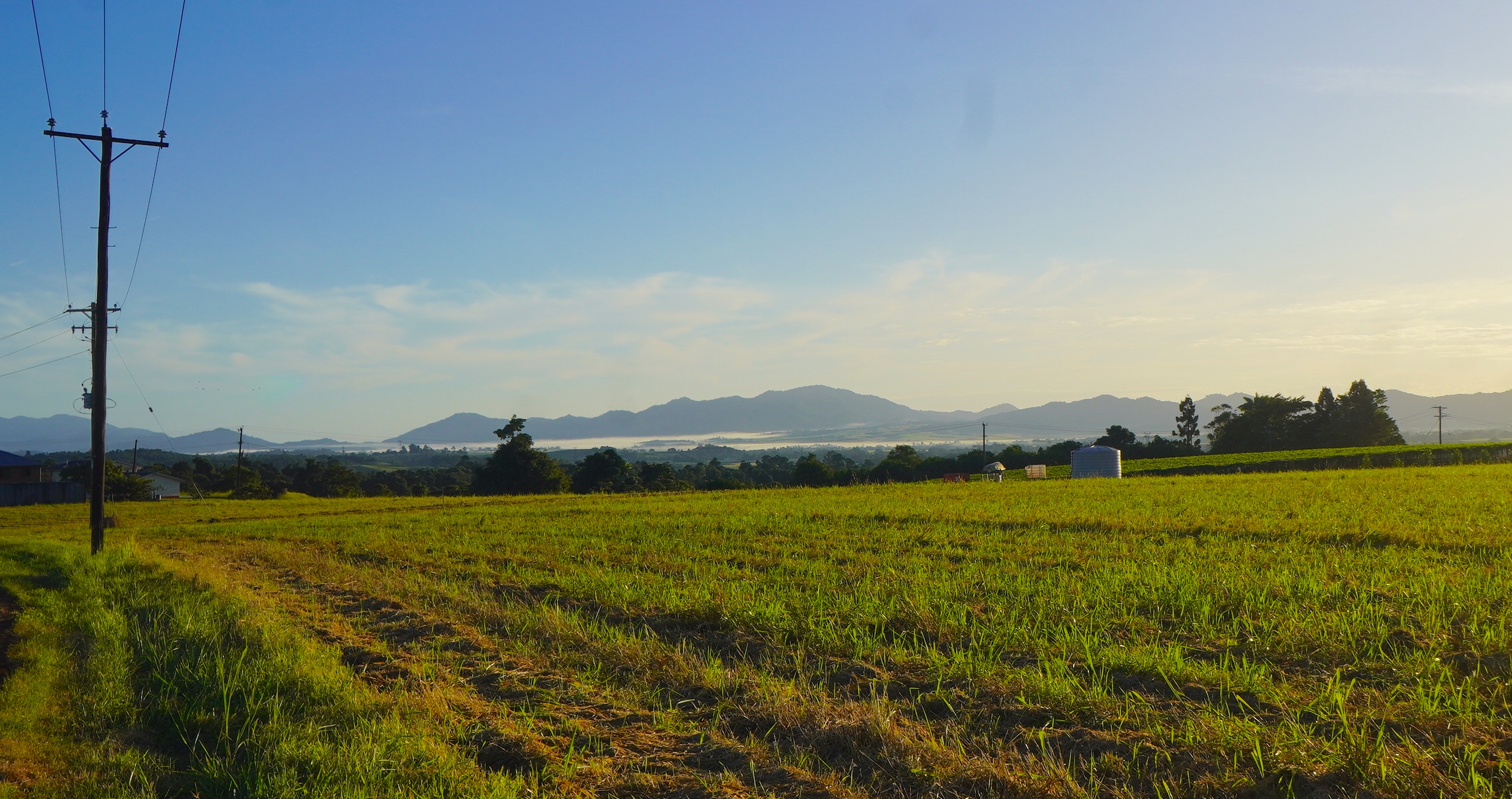
- Farming at East Palmerston, 2023

- Interactive map of East Palmerston
- Coordinates: 17.5944°S 145.8405°E
- Country: Australia
- State: Queensland
- LGA: Cassowary Coast Region
- Location: 25.2 km (15.7 mi) SW of Innisfail; 104 km (65 mi) S of Cairns; 275 km (171 mi) NNW of Townsville; 1,632 km (1,014 mi) NNW of Brisbane

Government
  - State electorate: Hill
  - Federal division: Kennedy

Area
  - Total: 42.0 km^{2} (16.2 sq mi)

Population
  - Total: 220 (2021 census)
  - Density: 5.24/km^{2} (13.6/sq mi)
- Time zone: UTC+10:00 (AEST)
- Postcode: 4860
Suburbs around East Palmerston
Wooroonooran	Nerada	Coorumba
Wooroonooran	East Palmerston	Mamu
Palmerston	Mamu	Mamu

East Palmerston is a rural locality in the Cassowary Coast Region, Queensland, Australia. In the 2021 census, it had a population of 220 people.

East Palmerston is a prominent banana growing region with some of Australia's largest banana plantations.

== Geography ==
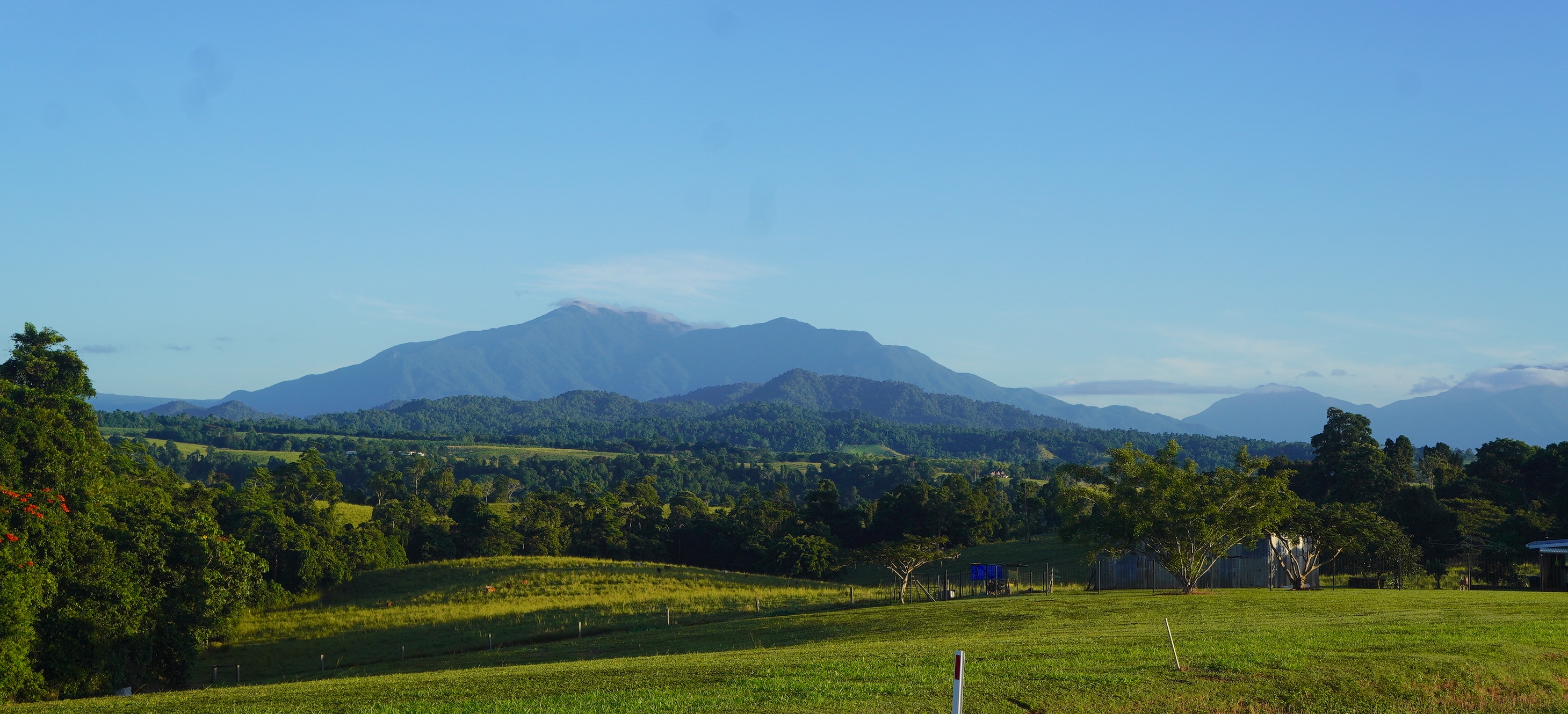
East Palmerston landscape, 2023

The Palmerston Highway enters the locality from the north-east (Nerada / Coorumba) and exits to the south-west through the locality (Palmerston / Wooroonooran).

The land use is a mixture of grazing on native vegetation and horticulture. It is a prominent banana growing region with some of Australia's largest banana plantations.

== History ==
The locality is presumably so named because it is to the east of neighbouring Palmerston, which in turn is believed to be named after explorer and prospector, Christie Palmerston.

About July 1933, the land of East Palmerston was surveyed to enable 10,400 acres be offered for selection in 55 lots. By September 1938, a large population was living in the area with some farms sufficiently established to supply cream to the Millaa Millaa butter factory.

The Palmerston East State School (sometimes called East Palmerston State School) opened on 19 April 1938. In 2010, the school had an enrolment of 17 students with 2 teachers (1 full-time equivalent) and 7 non-teaching staff (2 full-time equivalent). It closed on 26 April 2012. It was located at 2068 Palmerston Highway East (17.6033°S 145.8467°E). The school's website was archived.

On 25 April (Anzac Day) 2008, a memorial was unveiled at Palmerston East State School at 2068 Palmerston Highway commemorating the Australian servicemen and women who served during wars and other conflicts.

== Demographics ==
In the 2016 census, East Palmerston had a population of 173 people.

In the 2021 census, East Palmerston had a population of 220 people.

== Education ==
There are no schools in East Palmerston. The nearest government primary school is Mundoo State School in Wangan to the north-east. The nearest government secondary school is Innisfail State College in Innisfail Estate to the north-east.

== Community groups ==
The East Palmerston branch of the Queensland Country Women's Association meets at the Currajah Hotel, Grima Street, Wangan.
