= Waugh Pocket =

- Suburb
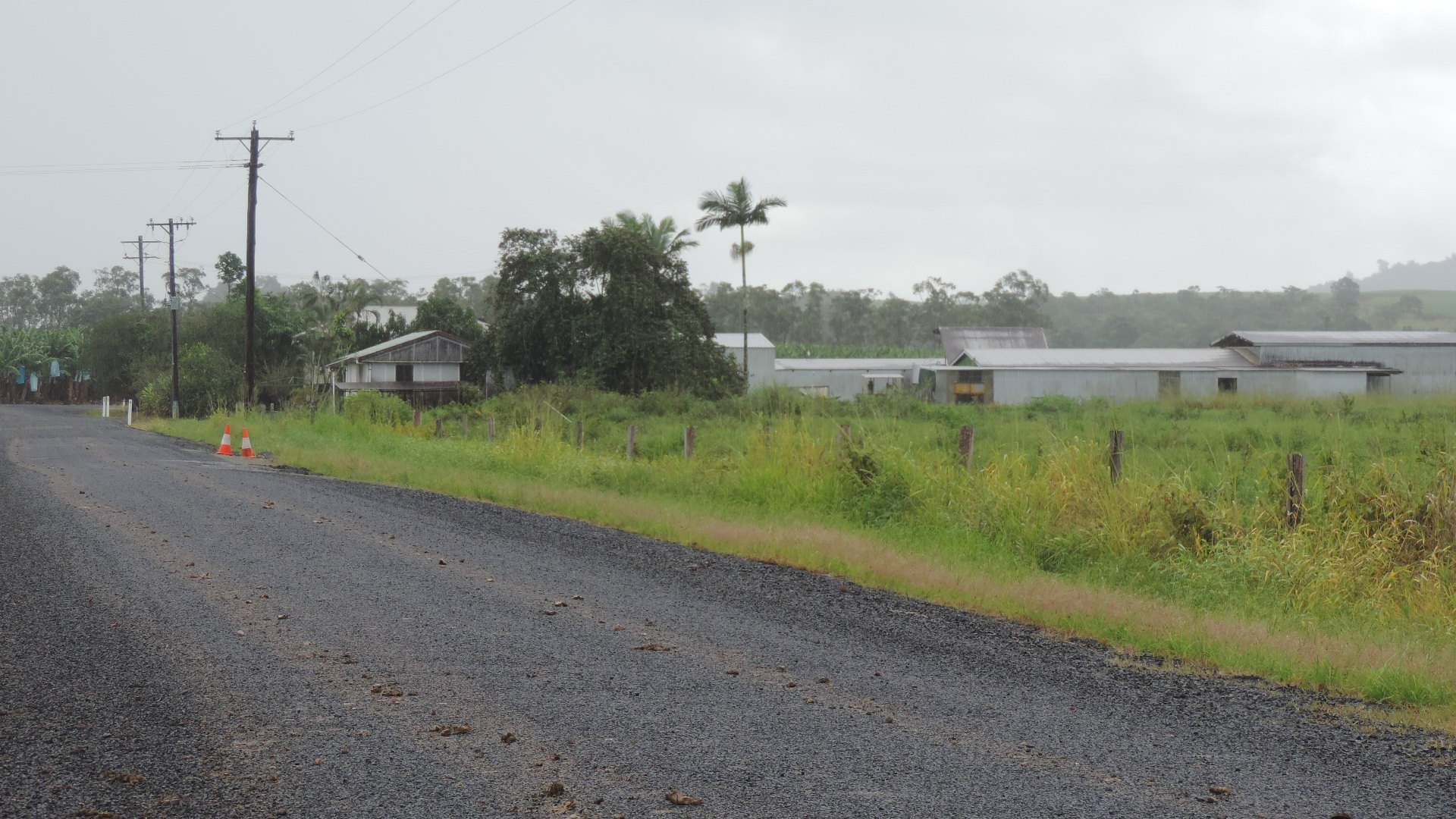
- Farm buildings, Waugh Pocket, 2018

- Interactive map of Waugh Pocket
- Coordinates: 17.4408°S 145.9316°E
- Country: Australia
- State: Queensland
- LGA: Cairns Region
- Location: 16.3 km (10.1 mi) S of Babinda; 18.0 km (11.2 mi) NE of Innisfail; 74.3 km (46.2 mi) S of Cairns; 1,644 km (1,022 mi) NNW of Brisbane

Government
  - State electorate: Hill
  - Federal division: Kennedy

Area
  - Total: 9.8 km^{2} (3.8 sq mi)

Population
  - Total: 46 (2021 census)
  - Density: 4.69/km^{2} (12.16/sq mi)
- Time zone: UTC+10:00 (AEST)
- Postcode: 4871
Suburbs around Waugh Pocket
Ngatjan	Eubenangee	Eubenangee
Woopen Creek	Waugh Pocket	Eubenangee
Ngatjan	Ngatjan	Vasa Views

Waugh Pocket is a rural locality in the Cairns Region, Queensland, Australia. In the 2021 census, Waugh Pocket had a population of 46 people.

== Geography ==
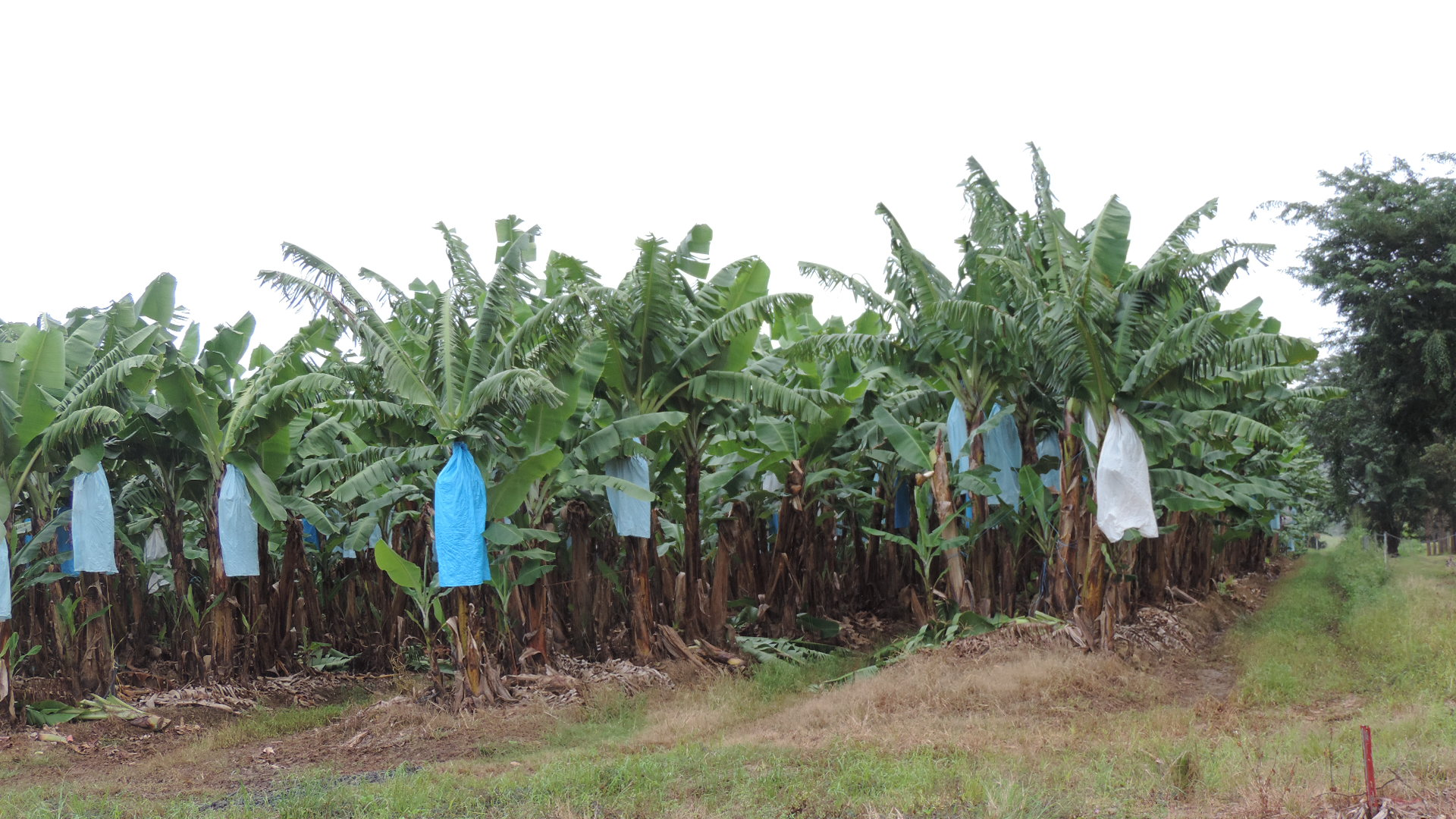
Banana farming, 2018

Waugh Pocket is bounded to the north-east by the Bruce Highway.

The terrain varies from 10 to 80 metres (33 to 262 ft) above sea level. The east and south of the locality are the lower-lying land which is used for growing crops (such as bananas and sugarcane) and grazing on native vegetation. The land in the north-west of the locality is mostly undeveloped or used for grazing.

== History ==
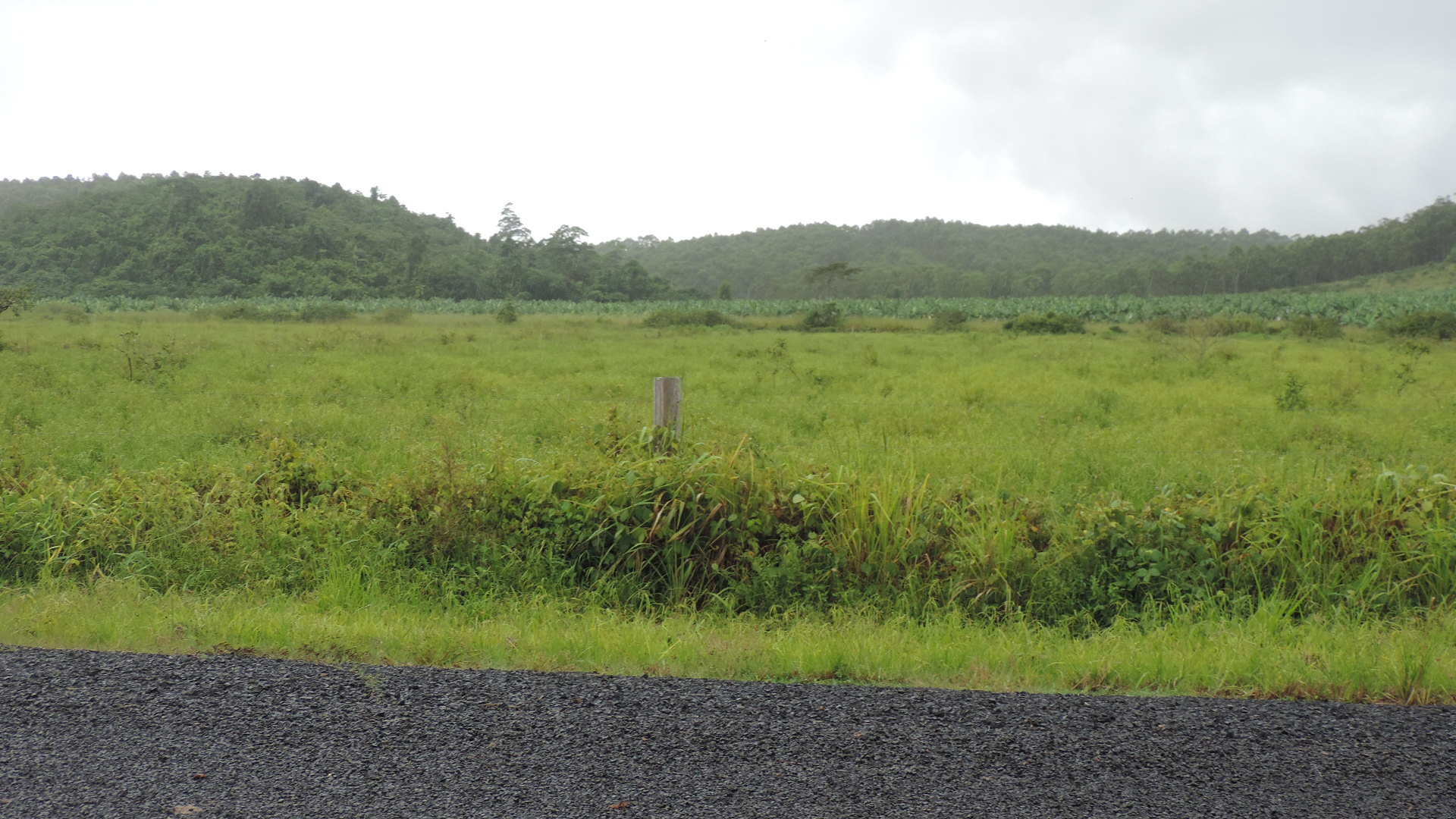
Farm land, Waugh Pocket, 2018

Robert Waugh and Robert McArdle explored the area in the 1880s. Robert Waugh settled in the area and it is named Waugh Pocket after him. Waugh was a farmer who served as a councillor on the Cairns Divisional Board.

== Demographics ==
In the 2016 census, Waugh Pocket had a population of 41 people.

In the 2021 census, Waugh Pocket had a population of 46 people.

== Education ==
There are no schools in Waugh Pocket. The nearest government primary school is Mirriwinni State School in Mirriwinni to the north. The nearest government secondary school is Babinda State School (to Year 12) in Babinda to the north.
