= Wooroonooran, Queensland =

Wooroonooran Queensland
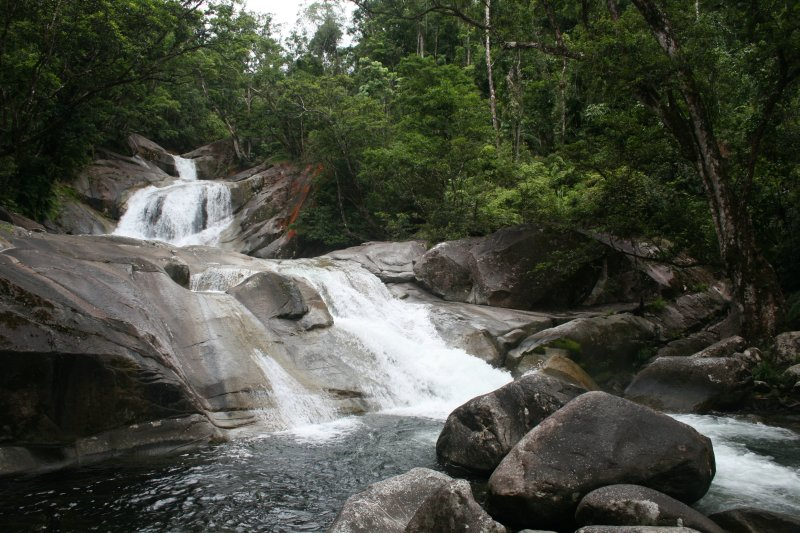
- Josephine Falls in Wooroonooran, 2007

- Coordinates: 17.3911°S 145.8202°E
- Population: 0 (2021 census)
  - Density: 0.0000/km^{2} (0.0000/sq mi)
- Postcode(s): 4860
- Area: 761.5 km^{2} (294.0 sq mi)
- LGA(s): Cairns Region; Cassowary Coast Region; Tablelands Region
- State electorate(s): Hill
- Federal division(s): Kennedy

Wooroonooran is an undeveloped locality split among the Cairns Region, the Cassowary Coast Region and the Tablelands Region in Queensland, Australia. In the 2021 census, Wooroonooran had "no people or a very low population".

== Geography ==
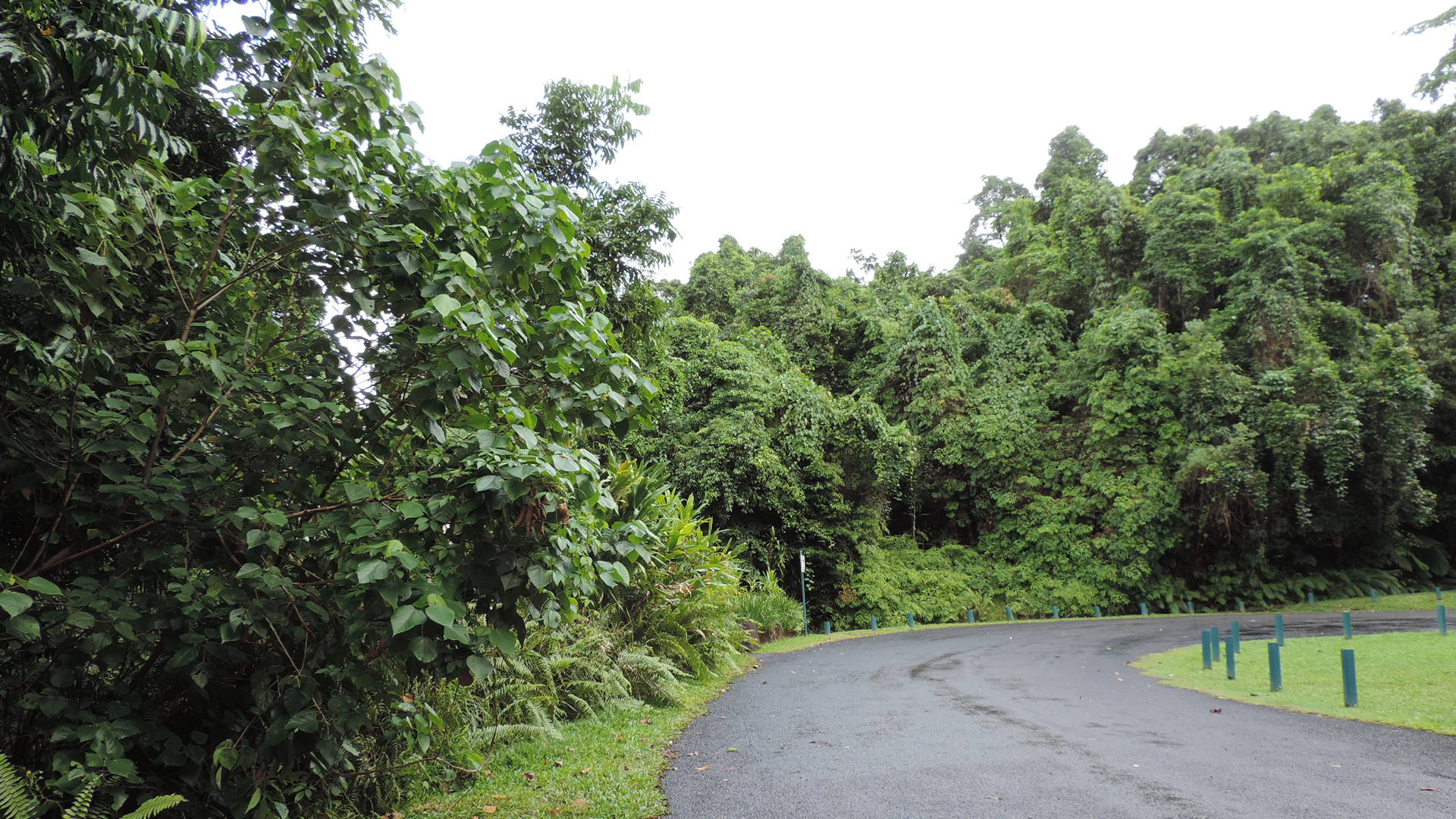
Road to Josephine Falls, Wooroonooran National Park, Wooroonooran, 2018

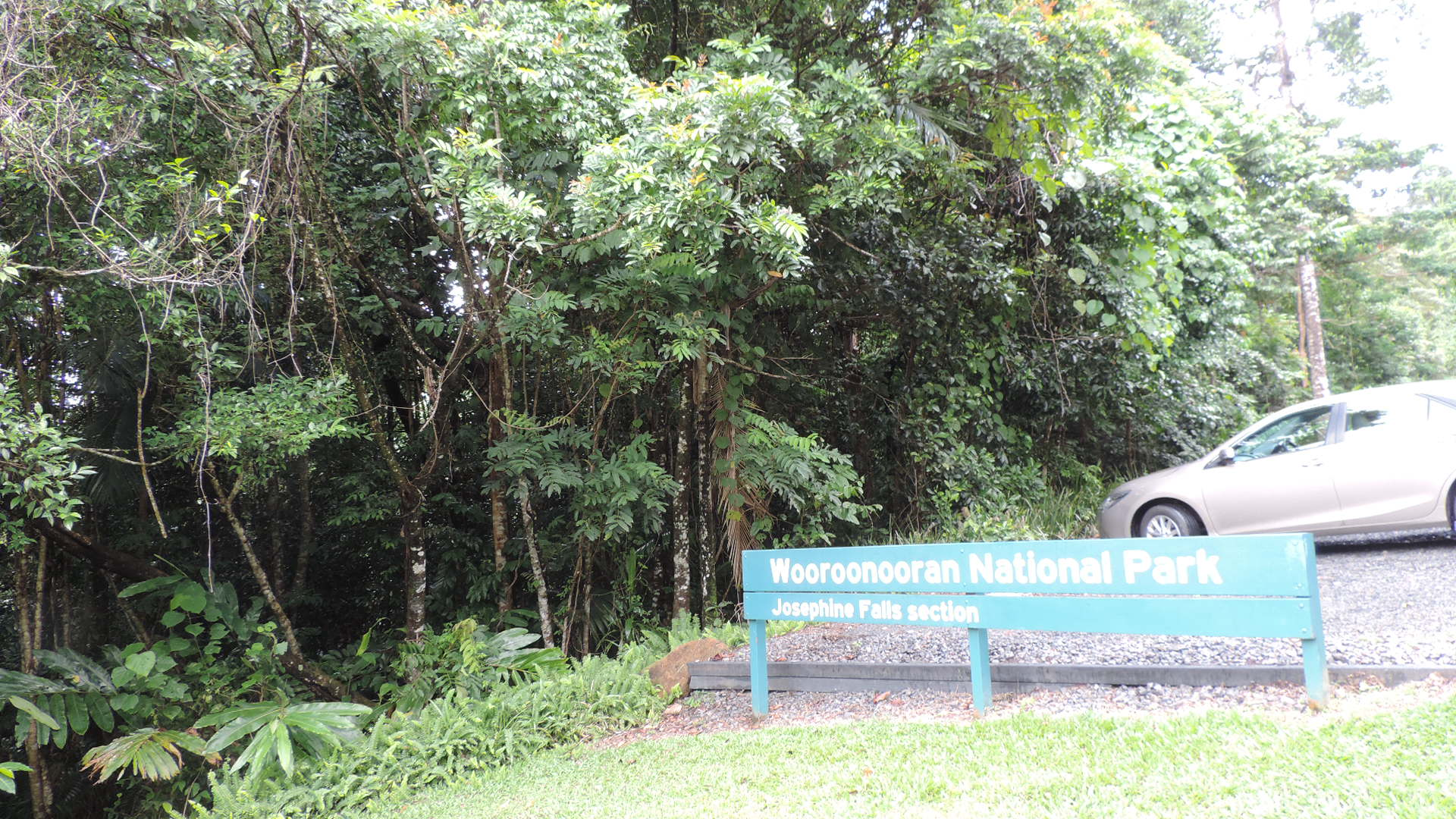
Josephine Falls carpark, Wooroonooran National Park, Wooroonooran, 2018

The locality is entirely within the Wooroonooran National Park (part of the Wet Tropics World Heritage Area), although the national park extends beyond the boundaries of the locality. As a consequence, the land is undeveloped apart from a very limited number of walking tracks and visitor amenities. The land is extremely mountainous containing numerous peaks, including Mount Bartle Frere (Queensland's highest peak), and numerous waterfalls, including the Josephine Falls and Fishery Falls (17.1833°S 145.8667°E).

The locality is very irregularly shaped and is approx 59 km from its northernmost point to its southernmost point and approx 38 km from its easternmost point to its westernmost point. Due to the vast size of this locality, it has numerous adjacent localities including (clockwise) Gordonvale (to the north), Aloomba, Fishery Falls, Bellenden Ker, Babinda, Mirriwinni (to the east), Bartle Frere, Woopen Creek, Ngatjan, Nerada, East Palmerston, Palmerston (to the south), Middlebrook, Mungalli, Ellinja, Millaa Millaa, Tarzali, Glen Allyn (to the west), Topaz, Butchers Creek, Gadgarra, and Goldsborough.

=== Mountain features ===
Wooroonooran has the following mountain features (from north to south):

- Walshs Pyramid (17.1294°S 145.8003°E) 922 metres (3,025 ft)
- Mount Toressa (17.1711°S 145.8483°E) 527 metres (1,729 ft)
- Mount Massie (17.1777°S 145.7926°E) 1,258 metres (4,127 ft)
- Mount Sophia (17.1908°S 145.8556°E) 789 metres (2,589 ft)
- Mount Harold (17.2008°S 145.7921°E) 1,257 metres (4,124 ft)
- North Peak (17.2335°S 145.8615°E) 1,455 metres (4,774 ft)
- Centre Peak (17.2597°S 145.8588°E) 1,589 metres (5,213 ft)
- Chickaboogalla (17.2973°S 145.8832°E) 1,013 metres (3,323 ft)
- South Peak (17.2976°S 145.8709°E) 1,211 metres (3,973 ft)
- Windin Gorge (17.3199°S 145.7668°E)
- Bartle Frere (North Peak, also known as Chooreechillum) (17.3820°S 145.8148°E) 1,524 metres (5,000 ft)
- Bartle Frere (North West Peak) (17.3852°S 145.8008°E) 1,476 metres (4,843 ft)
- Bartle Frere (South Peak)(17.3991°S 145.8182°E) 1,611 metres (5,285 ft)
- Conzelmann Bluff (17.4178°S 145.7404°E)
- Broken Nose (17.4252°S 145.8259°E) 962 metres (3,156 ft)
- Mount Clare (17.4667°S 145.7994°E)
- Mount Fletcher (17.4703°S 145.7725°E) 761 metres (2,497 ft)
- Twin Pinnacles (17.4806°S 145.8066°E) 801 metres (2,628 ft)
- Sugarloaf Mountain (17.4972°S 145.8400°E)
- Mount Poorka (17.5847°S 145.7958°E) 690 metres (2,260 ft)

=== Waterfalls ===
Wooroonooran has the following waterfalls (from north to south):

- Fishery Falls (17.1833°S 145.8666°E)
- Clamshell Falls (17.1897°S 145.8236°E)
- Whites Falls (17.2°S 145.8333°E)
- Babinda Falls (17.3294°S 145.835°E)
- Churnano Falls (17.3666°S 145.7666°E)
- Bobbin Bobbin Falls (17.3666°S 145.7833°E)
- Rapid Falls (17.3666°S 145.7833°E)
- Josephine Falls (17.4297°S 145.8594°E)
- Guilfoyle Falls (17.4497°S 145.7494°E)
- Camellia Falls (17.45°S 145.7°E)
- Jones Falls (17.5833°S 145.8166°E)
- Nandroya Falls (17.5861°S 145.7488°E)
- Tchupala Falls (17.6008°S 145.78°E)

== History ==
The Mamu Rainforest Tropical Skywalk was constructed by the Queensland Parks and Wildlife Service between 2008 and 2008. The work was contracted to Hutchinson Builders Pty Ltd.

== Demographics ==
In the 2016 census, Wooroonooran had "no people or a very low population".

In the 2021 census, Wooroonooran had "no people or a very low population" .

== Education ==
There are no schools in Wooroonooran. Due to the size of the locality, the school options in nearby localities depend on the location of the student's residence within Wooroonooran.

== Attractions ==
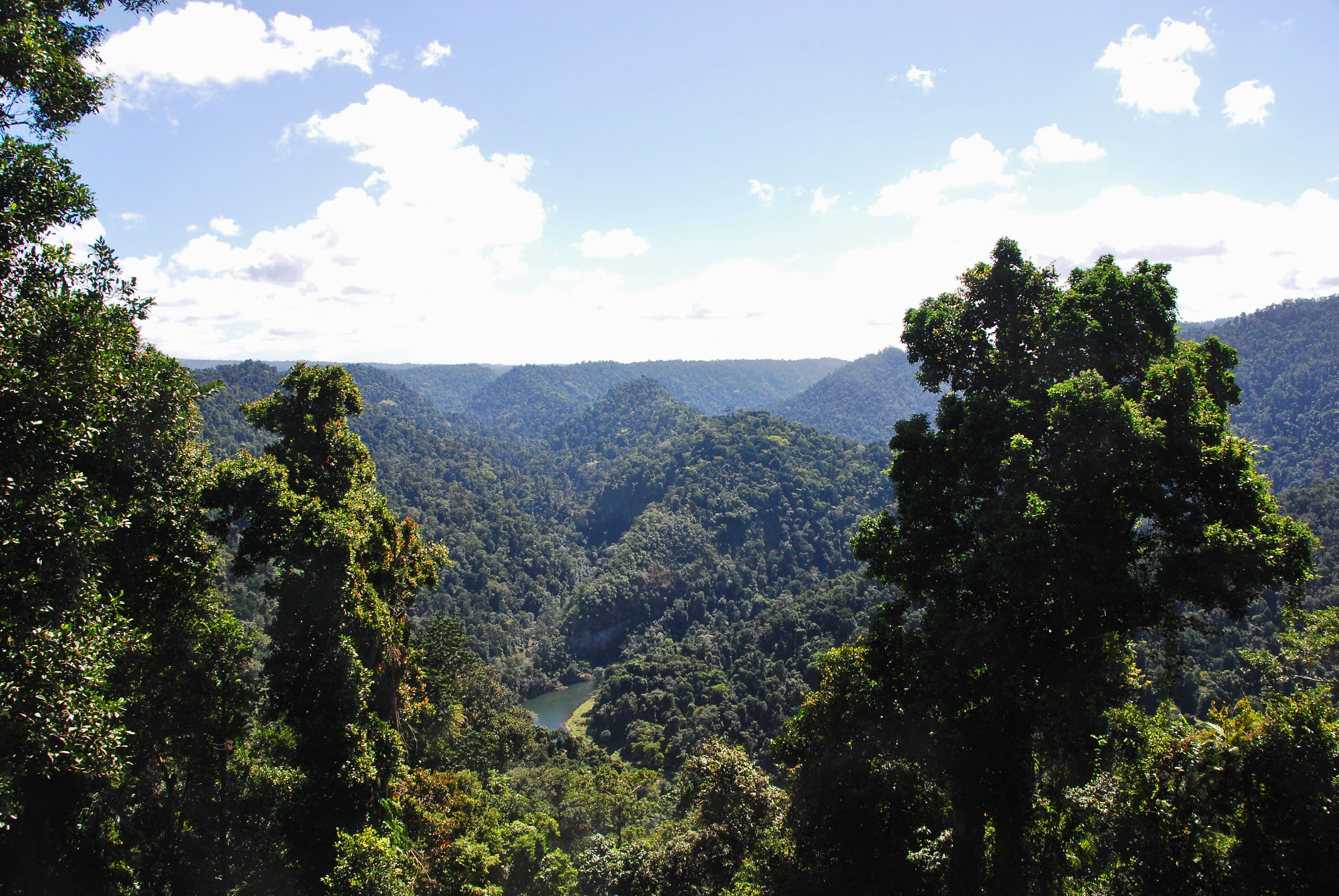
View of the rain forest and Johnstone River from the Mamu Tropical Skywalk, 2017

The Mamu Rainforest Tropical Skywalk is on the Palmerston Highway (17.6129°S 145.7979°E).

=== Lookouts ===
There are a number of lookouts in Wooroonooran (from north to south):

- Coronation Lookout (17.3333°S 145.8°E)
- North West Peak Lookout, a challenging 10.1 kilometres (6.3 mi) return-trip walk (17.3873°S 145.8094°E).
- North Johnstone Lookout (17.6084°S 145.7941°E)
- Crawfords Lookout (17.6121°S 145.7942°E)
