= Coorumba, Queensland =

Coorumba
- Suburb
- Interactive map of Coorumba
- Coordinates: 17.5711°S 145.9088°E
- Country: Australia
- State: Queensland
- LGA: Cassowary Coast Region
- Location: 15.9 km (9.9 mi) WSW of Innisfail; 94.6 km (58.8 mi) S of Cairns; 265 km (165 mi) NNW of Townsville; 1,597 km (992 mi) NNW of Brisbane

Government
  - State electorate: Hill
  - Federal division: Kennedy

Area
  - Total: 17.7 km^{2} (6.8 sq mi)

Population
  - Total: 137 (2021 census)
  - Density: 7.74/km^{2} (20.05/sq mi)
- Time zone: UTC+10:00 (AEST)
- Postcode: 4860
Suburbs around Coorumba
Nerada	Nerada	Ngatjan
East Palmerston	Coorumba	Pin Gin Hill
Mamu	No 6 Branch	No 6 Branch

Coorumba is a rural locality in the Cassowary Coast Region, Queensland, Australia. In the 2021 census, Coorumba had a population of 137 people.

== Geography ==
The Johnstone River forms the northern boundary of the locality and the South Johnstone River forms the southern boundary. The land is almost entirely freehold and used for agriculture, including cropping (particularly sugarcane) on the flatter land and grazing on the more sloping land. The Palmerston Highway passes through the locality from east to west and there is a cane tramway to transport the harvested sugarcane to the South Johnstone sugar mill.

Pioneer North Queensland Pty Ltd operate the Innisfail Hard Rock Quarry in the north of the locality, with a production capacity of 150 tonnes per hour.

Fishers Falls is a waterfall on Berner Creek (17.55°S 145.9166°E) in the north of the locality.

Beehive Island is an island (17.5883°S 145.9066°E) in the South Johnstone River on the southern boundary with Mamu.

== History ==
Coorumba was formerly a stopping place on the Innisfail-Nerada Tramway.

Coorumba Provisional School opened on 28 January 1924 on land donated by the Queensland National Bank. In 1925 it became Coorumba State School. It closed on 14 December 1979. It was located along the tramway (approx 17.5646°S 145.9134°E). After its closure, the Coorumba Progress Association was allowed to continue to use the school building, However, when the progress association disbanded in 1986 and given that the school building was in a poor state of repair, the Queensland Government decided to sell the site, since it was not possible to return it to the original donor as the Queensland National Bank no longer existed.

== Demographics ==
In the 2016 census, Coorumba had a population of 121 people.

In the 2021 census, Coorumba had a population of 137 people.

== Education ==
There are no schools in Coorumba. The nearest government primary school is Mundoo State School in Wangan to the east. The nearest government secondary school is Innisfail State College in Innisfail Estate to the north-east.
