= Upper Daradgee, Queensland =

Upper Daradgee
- Suburb
- Interactive map of Upper Daradgee
- Coordinates: 17.5249°S 145.9583°E
- Country: Australia
- State: Queensland
- LGA: Cassowary Coast Region
- Location: 13.1 km (8.1 mi) W of Innisfail; 89.2 km (55.4 mi) S of Cairns; 272 km (169 mi) NNW of Townsville; 104 km (65 mi) NNW of Brisbane

Government
  - State electorate: Hill
  - Federal division: Kennedy

Area
  - Total: 18.4 km^{2} (7.1 sq mi)

Population
  - Total: 99 (2021 census)
  - Density: 5.38/km^{2} (13.94/sq mi)
- Time zone: UTC+10:00 (AEST)
- Postcode: 4860
Suburbs around Upper Daradgee
| Ngatjan | Fitzgerald Creek | Fitzgerald Creek |
| Ngatjan | Upper Daradgee | O'Briens Hill |
| Pin Gin Hill | Pin Gin Hill | Stoters Hill |

Upper Daradgee is a rural locality in the Cassowary Coast Region, Queensland, Australia. In the 2021 census, Upper Daradgee had a population of 99 people.

== Geography ==
Upper Daradgee is bounded by the Johnstone River to the north-east, east and south-east. The land rises from being almost at sea level at the river to up to 110 metres (360 ft) in the north-west of the locality, which is within the foothills of the Francis Range.

The land use depends largely on the elevation within the locality. In the lower areas closer to the river, the land is used for cropping, mostly sugarcane and bananas. In the higher areas the land is used for grazing on native vegetation.

== History ==
Daradgee Upper State School opened on 6 February 1931 and closed in 1968. It was at approx 273 Upper Darradgee Road (17.4889°S 146.0023°E).

== Demographics ==
In the 2016 census, Upper Daradgee had a population of 101 people.

In the 2021 census, Upper Daradgee had a population of 99 people.

== Education ==
There are no schools in Upper Daradgee. The nearest government primary school is Goondi State School in Goondi Bend. The nearest government secondary school is Innisfail State College in Innisfail Estate. There are also Catholic primary and secondary schools in Innisfail.
