= Nerada, Queensland =

Nerada
- Suburb
- Interactive map of Nerada
- Coordinates: 17.5491°S 145.8713°E
- Country: Australia
- State: Queensland
- LGA: Cassowary Coast Region
- Location: 28.0 km (17.4 mi) WSW of Innisfail; 104 km (65 mi) S of Cairns; 275 km (171 mi) NNW of Townsville; 1,636 km (1,017 mi) NNW of Brisbane

Government
  - State electorate: Hill
  - Federal division: Kennedy

Area
  - Total: 32.2 km^{2} (12.4 sq mi)

Population
  - Total: 88 (2021 census)
  - Density: 2.733/km^{2} (7.08/sq mi)
- Time zone: UTC+10:00 (AEST)
- Postcode: 4860
Suburbs around Nerada
Wooroonooran	Ngatjan	Cooroo Lands
Wooroonooran	Nerada	Coorumba
Wooroonooran	East Palmerston	Coorumba

Nerada is a rural locality in the Cassowary Coast Region, Queensland, Australia. In the 2021 census, Nerada had a population of 88 people.

== Geography ==
The locality is bounded to the west, north-west, north, north-east, and east by the Johnstone River.

Palmerston Rocks National Park is in the south-east of the locality.

Apart from the national park, the land use is predominantly growing crops, including sugarcane and bananas with some grazing on native vegetation.

== History ==
The locality takes its name from the former Nerada railway station (17.55063°S 145.88029°E) on the Innisfail Tramway. The name is believed to be an Aboriginal word from the Mamoo language meaning grass country.

In May 1936, the Queensland Government decided to construct a school at Nerada. Nerada State School opened on 11 February 1937. It closed in 1945. It was located at approximately 334 Nerada Road (17.5486°S 145.8703°E). About 1951, the school building was relocated to Woopen Creek State School.

In 1958, Dr Allan Maruff started the first commercial tea plantings in Australia since 1886 in the Nerada valley, south of Cairns, Queensland, using seedlings from the former Cutten brothers plantation at Bingil Bay. In 1969, Tea Estates of Australia (TEA) commenced tea planting adjacent to the Nerada plantation. In 1971, Nerada Tea Estates (NTE) opened Australia's first commercial tea factory. In 1973, TEA purchased NTE, ceased selling bulk tea and marketed the tea under the Nerada brand.

After a number of problems in the 1980s, the original Nerada tea plantation was sold to banana farmers.

== Demographics ==
In the 2016 census, Nerada had a population of 97 people.

In the 2021 census, Nerada had a population of 88 people.

== Education ==
There are no schools in Nerada. The nearest government primary school is Mundoo State School in Wangan to the east. The nearest government secondary school is Innisfail State College in Innisfail Estate to the north-east.
