= Bartle Frere, Queensland =

Bartle Frere
- Suburb
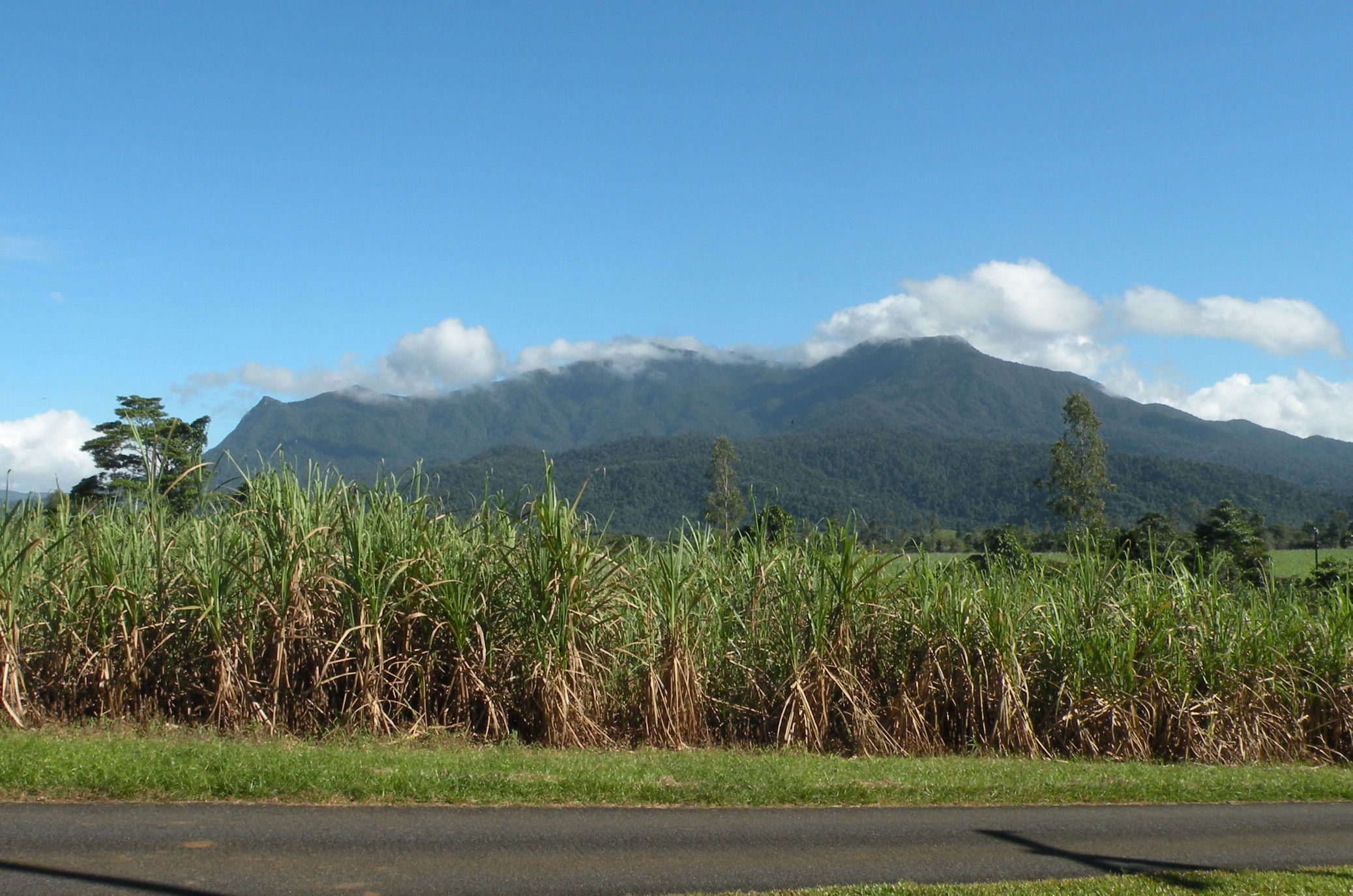
- View across the canefields of Bartle Frere with Mount Bartle Frere in the distance, 2014

- Interactive map of Bartle Frere
- Coordinates: 17.4397°S 145.885°E
- Country: Australia
- State: Queensland
- LGA: Cairns Region
- Location: 13.0 km (8.1 mi) SSW of Babinda; 24.4 km (15.2 mi) NW of Innisfail; 71.0 km (44.1 mi) S of Cairns CBD; 1,645 km (1,022 mi) NNW of Brisbane

Government
  - State electorate: Hill
  - Federal division: Kennedy

Area
  - Total: 16.6 km^{2} (6.4 sq mi)

Population
  - Total: 169 (2021 census)
  - Density: 10.18/km^{2} (26.37/sq mi)
- Time zone: UTC+10:00 (AEST)
- Postcode: 4861
Suburbs around Bartle Frere
Wooroonooran	Wooroonooran	Mirriwinni
Wooroonooran	Bartle Frere	Eubenangee
Woopen Creek	Woopen Creek	Woopen Creek

Bartle Frere is a rural locality in the Cairns Region, Queensland, Australia. In the 2021 census, Bartle Frere had a population of 169 people.

== Geography ==
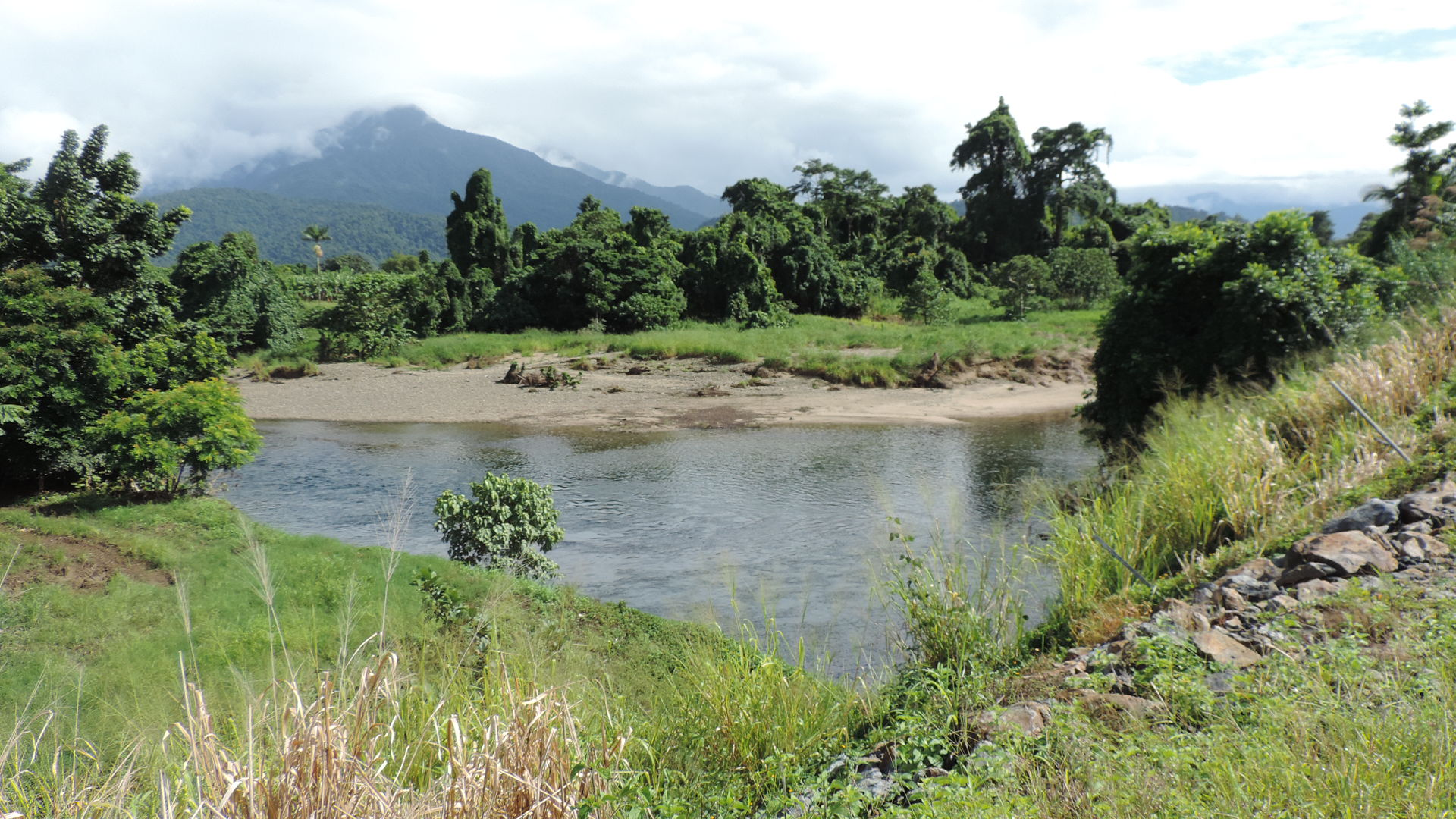
Russell River, boundary between Woopen Creek (foreground) and Bartle Frere (background), 2018

The locality of Bartle Frere lies to the south of Mount Bartle Frere. The locality is flat low-lying land (10–20 metres above sea level) and is freehold land used for farming, predominantly the growing of sugarcane. The Russell River forms the boundary to the locality to the south and east.

The Bruce Highway forms the northern boundary of the locality with the North Coast railway line immediately parallel and adjacent to the north (just outside the boundary of the locality in neighbouring Eubenangee).

== History ==
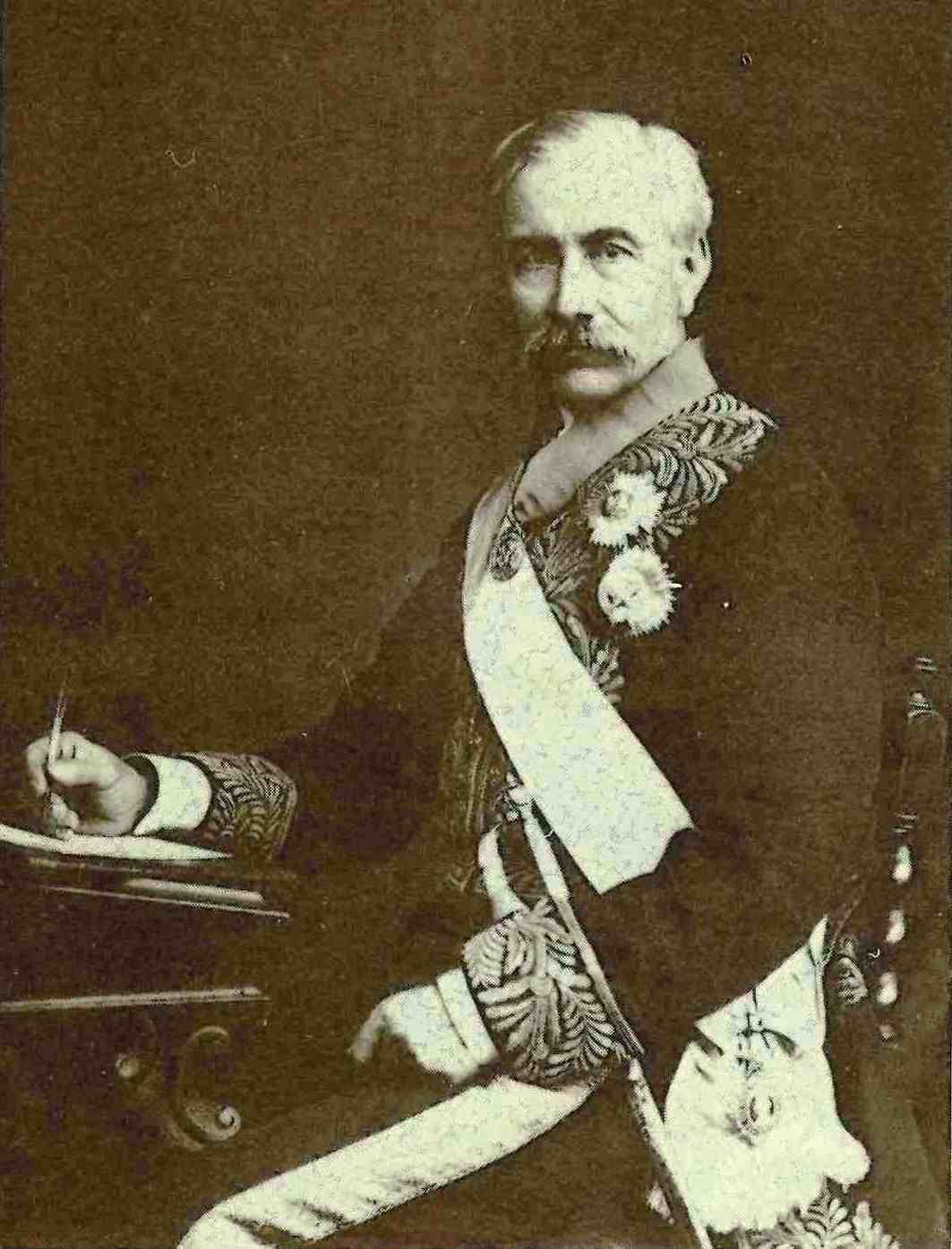
Sir Henry Bartle Frere

The locality takes its name from Mount Bartle Frere, which in turn was named after Sir Henry Bartle Frere, the president of the Royal Geographical Society, by explorer George Elphinstone Dalrymple on 30 September 1873.

Bartle Frere State School opened on 30 January 1922.

== Demographics ==
In the 2011 census, Bartle Frere had a population of 361 people.

In the 2016 census, Bartle Frere had a population of 137 people.

In the 2021 census, Bartle Frere had a population of 169 people.

== Education ==
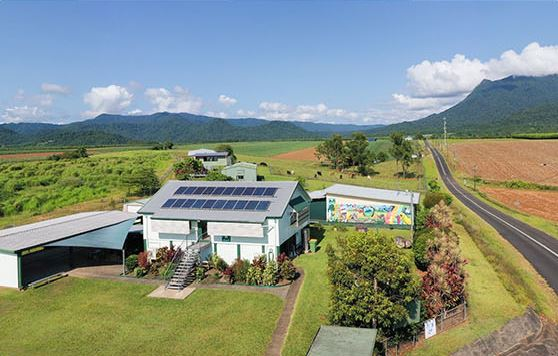
Bartle Frere State School

Bartle Frere State School is a government primary (Prep-6) school for boys and girls at 29 Price Road (17.4446°S 145.8852°E). In 2016, the school had an enrolment of 8 students with 2 teachers (1 full-time equivalent) and 4 non-teaching staff (2 full-time equivalent). In 2018, the school had an enrolment of 11 students with 2 teachers (1 full-time equivalent) and 4 non-teaching staff (2 full-time equivalent).

There are no secondary schools in Bartle Frere. The nearest government school offering secondary education to Year 12 is Babinda State School in Babinda to the north-east.
