= Goondi, Queensland =

Goondi
- Suburb
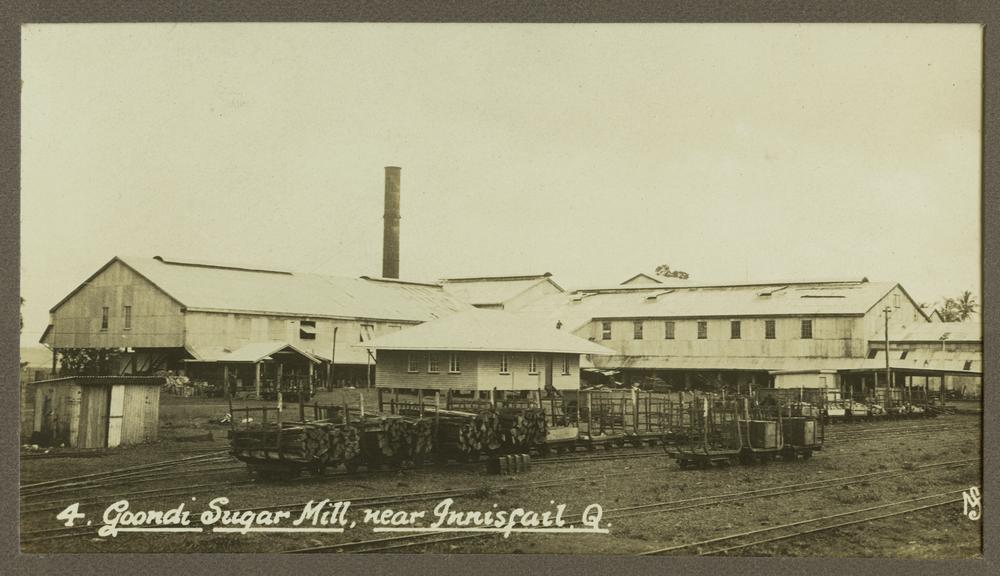
- Goondi Sugar Mill, 1930

- Interactive map of Goondi
- Coordinates: 17.5041°S 146.0055°E
- Country: Australia
- State: Queensland
- LGA: Cassowary Coast Region
- Location: 4.8 km (3.0 mi) NW of Innisfail; 87.5 km (54.4 mi) S of Cairns; 264 km (164 mi) N of Townsville; 1,601 km (995 mi) NNW of Brisbane

Government
  - State electorate: Hill
  - Federal division: Kennedy

Area
  - Total: 2.9 km^{2} (1.1 sq mi)

Population
  - Total: 28 (2021 census)
  - Density: 9.7/km^{2} (25.0/sq mi)
- Time zone: UTC+10:00 (AEST)
- Postcode: 4860
Suburbs around Goondi
Fitzgerald Creek	Daradgee	Sundown
O'Briens Hill	Goondi	Cullinane
Belvedere	Hudson	Goondi Bend

Goondi is a rural locality in the Cassowary Coast Region, Queensland, Australia. In the 2021 census, Goondi had a population of 28 people.

== Geography ==
Goondi is riverside land wrapped around the southern side of an elbow-shaped bend in the Johnstone River. It is very flat land, being 0 to 10 metres above sea level, and is predominantly used for growing sugar cane and bananas. Reid Creek flows from the north-east of the locality from neighbouring Sundown through to the Johnstone River in the north of the locality. There is very little residential development in Goondi.

The Bruce Highway passes from south to north through the south-western edge of Goondi crossing the Johnstone River at the Sir Joseph McAvoy Bridge, while the North Coast railway line travels from south to north along Goondi's north-eastern border and crosses the Johnstone River. There is a private cane train tramway in the west of the locality, used to transport harvested sugar cane to the local sugar mill.

== History ==
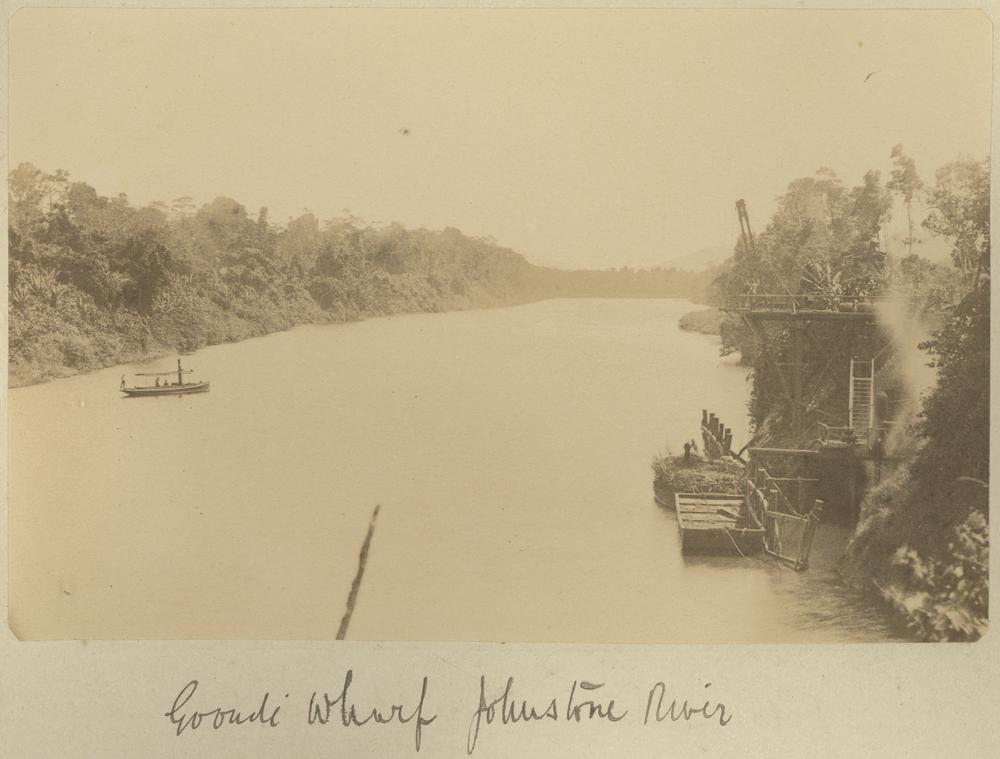
Goondi Wharf on the Johnstone River, circa 1885

The name "Goondi' is believed to be an Aboriginal word meaning "elbow", referring to the bend in the river.

The Goondi Sugar Mill opened in 1883, between the end of Goondi Mill Road and Knox Avenue near the Johnstone River (17.5062°S 146.0036°E). During World War 2 with Japanese air attacks on northern Australia an aerial dog fight was sighted above Goondi Mill between a Japanese Zero and an Allied fighter plane, with the Zero being shot down in the cane fields. Goondi Mill and other strategic assets had been mined at the time with explosives, and should the Japanese attack and land troops, destroyed, with planned guerilla warfare resistance based across the Atherton Tablelands. Up until the 1960s the Mill had its own dairy delivering fresh milk door to door daily. It closed in 1987 after being taken over by Bundaberg Sugar.

Goondi Provisional School opened on 17 February 1898. On 1 January 1909, it became Goondi State School. It was originally located on the south side of Goondi Mill Road (approx 17.5099°S 146.0040°E), but, by 1974, had relocated to the school's present location in Goondi Bend.

== Demographics ==
In the 2016 census, Goondi had a population of 56 people.

In the 2021 census, Goondi had a population of 28 people.

== Education ==
There are no schools in Goondi. The nearest government primary school is Goondi State School in neighbouring Goondi Bend to the south-east. The nearest government secondary school is Innisfail State College in Innisfail Estate to the east.

== See also ==
- List of tramways in Queensland
