= Mirriwinni, Queensland =

Mirriwinni
- Town
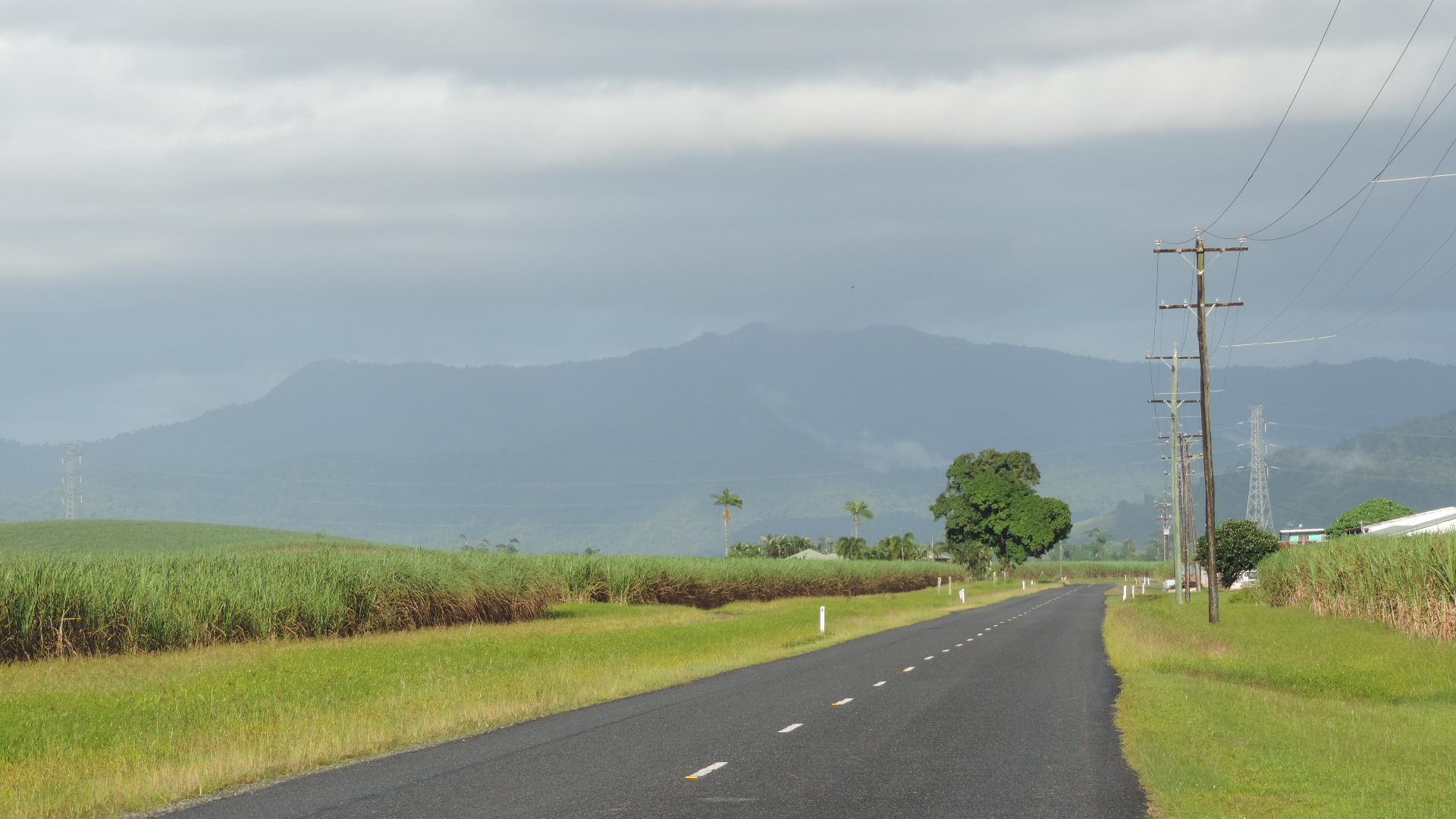
- Looking south-west along Buckland Road, 2018

- Interactive map of Mirriwinni
- Coordinates: 17.3983°S 145.9091°E
- Country: Australia
- State: Queensland
- LGA: Cairns Region
- Location: 7.0 km (4.3 mi) S of Babinda; 22.7 km (14.1 mi) NW of Innisfail; 65.0 km (40.4 mi) S of Cairns CBD; 1,613 km (1,002 mi) NNW of Brisbane

Government
  - State electorate: Hill
  - Federal division: Kennedy

Area
  - Total: 46.8 km^{2} (18.1 sq mi)

Population
  - Total: 492 (2021 census)
  - Density: 10.513/km^{2} (27.23/sq mi)
- Time zone: UTC+10:00 (AEST)
- Postcode: 4871
Localities around Mirriwinni
Babinda	Babinda	Babinda
Wooroonooran	Mirriwinni	East Russell
Bartle Frere	Bartle Frere	Eubenangee

Mirriwinni is a rural town and locality in the Cairns Region, Queensland, Australia. The spelling Miriwinni has also been used historically, but Mirriwinni is the official spelling from 8 October 2010. In the 2021 census, the locality of Mirriwinni had a population of 492 people.

== Geography ==
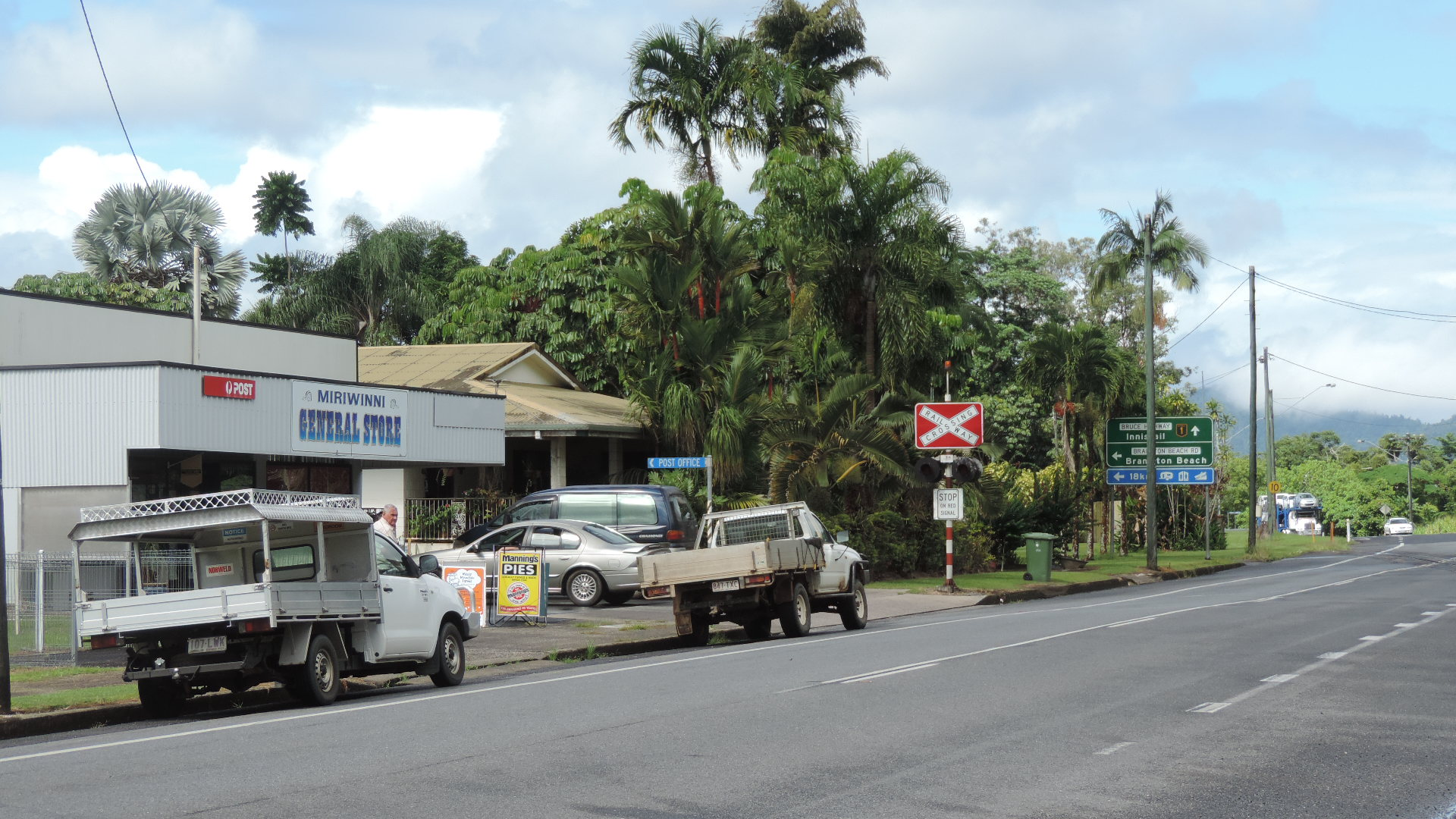
Town of Mirriwinni on the Bruce Highway, 2018

The town is south of the centre of the locality. The Russell River forms the eastern and south-eastern boundary, while Babinda Creek forms part of the northern boundary. The foothills of Mount Bartle Frere form the western boundary.

Most of the land in the locality is flat low-lying land (approx 10 metres above sea level) and is used for farming, predominantly growing sugarcane. However, in the western edge of the locality, the land rises to up to 150 metres above sea level heading towards the peaks of Mount Bartle Frere in the adjacent locality of Wooroonooran.

The Bruce Highway and the North Coast railway line traverse the locality from south to west, both passing through the town. There is no railway station in the locality, but historically it was served by two now-abandoned stations:

- Miriwinni railway station, in the town (17.4002°S 145.9109°E)
- Pawngilly railway station, south of the town (17.4137°S 145.9095°E)

There is a network of tramways that transport the harvested sugarcane to the local sugar mill.

== History ==
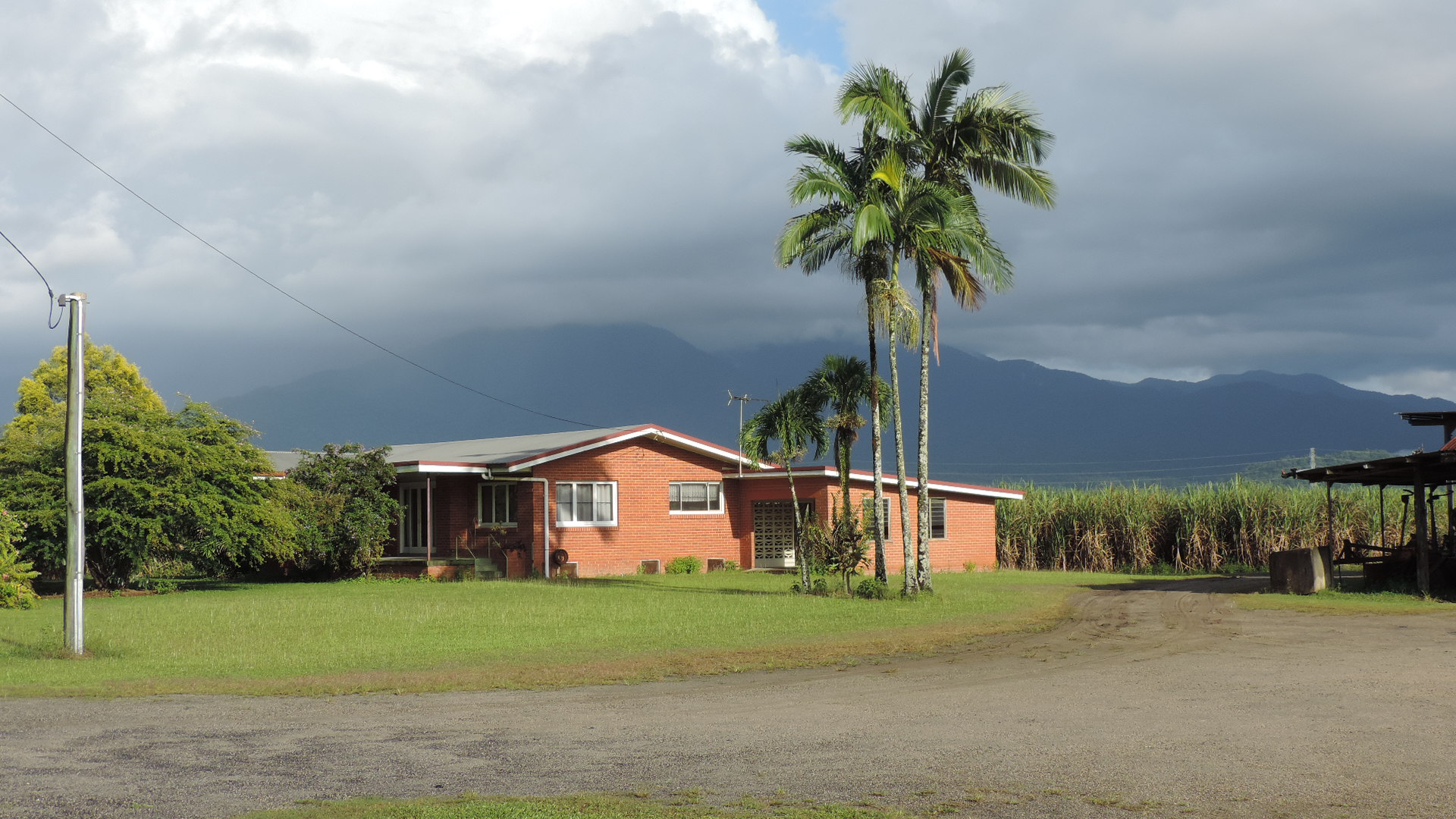
Homestead among the cane fields, 2018

The town takes its name from the railway station name, first used by the Queensland Railways Department on 18 February 1915, reportedly an Aboriginal word meaning mountain rock.

Mooliba railway station opened in 1912. It was renamed Moolaba railway station in 1917 and renamed Pawngilly railway station in 1926. The name Pawngilly is an Aboriginal word meaning big hill.

On 20 April 1916, the Cane Beetles March commenced at Mooliba. It was a snowball march to recruit men into the Australian Imperial Force during World War I at a time when enthusiasm to enlist had waned after the loss of life in the Gallipoli campaign. The march began at Mooliba with 4 men, passing through Babinda, Aloomba, Gordonvale, and Edmonton, and ending in Cairns 60 kilometers later with 29 recruits.

Miriwinni Provisional School opened on 16 October 1916 and became Miriwinni State School on 1 March 1918. On 9 July 2012, it was renamed Mirriwinni State School.

Miriwinni Post Office opened on 1 July 1925 (a receiving office had been open from 1915).

== Demographics ==
In the 2016 census, the locality of Mirriwinni had a population of 447 people.

In the 2021 census, the locality of Mirriwinni had a population of 492 people.

== Education ==
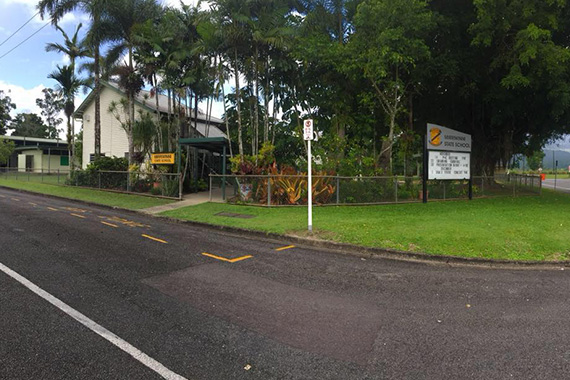
Mirriwinni State School, 2022

Mirriwinni State School is a government primary (Prep-6) school for boys and girls at 3 Whitman Street (17.4022°S 145.9097°E). In 2016, the school had an enrolment of 58 children with 3 teachers (3 full-time equivalent) and 6 non-teaching staff (4 full-time equivalent). In 2018, the school had an enrolment of 49 students with 3 teachers (2 full-time equivalent) and 6 non-teaching staff (4 full-time equivalent).

There are no secondary schools in Mirriwinni. The nearest government secondary school is Babinda State School (to Year 12) in neighbouring Babinda to the north.

== Notable residents ==
- Brad Beven, triathlete
