= Palmerston Highway =

Highway in Queensland, Australia

Palmerston Highway Queensland
- Palmerston Highway (green and black)

General information
- Type: Highway
- Length: 54.6 km (34 mi)
- Route number(s): State Route 25

Major junctions
- West end: Malanda–Millaa Millaa Road, Millaa Millaa, Queensland
- East end: Bruce Highway, Innisfail, Queensland

Location(s)
- Major settlements: Palmerston

Highway system
- Highways in Australia; National Highway • Freeways in Australia; Highways in Queensland

The Palmerston Highway (State Route 25) connects the Cassowary Coast coastal strip to the southern part of the Tablelands Region, in Far North Queensland, Australia.

== Route ==
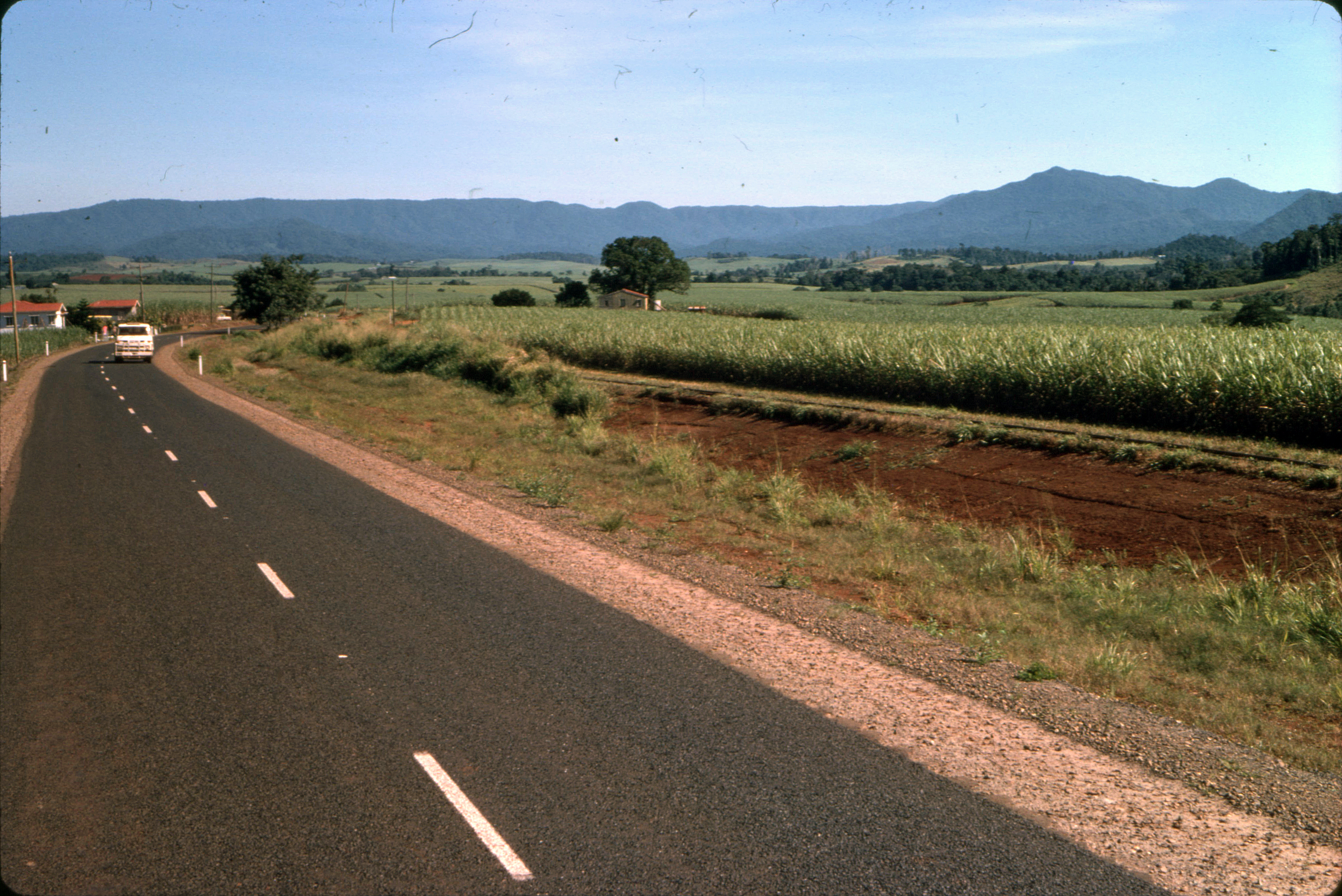
Palmerston Highway surrounded by sugarcane fields, 1976

The highway splits from the Bruce Highway in Goondi just north-west of Innisfail (17.51432°S 145.99374°E). It then winds through the Wooroonooran National Park to the township of Millaa Millaa, with no major road junctions. It terminates at an intersection with Old Palmerston Highway (now called Beatrice Way) and Main Street (17.51328°S 145.61310°E). Its total length is 54.6 kilometres.

From Millaa Millaa, State Route 25 continues west and then north as Malanda–Millaa Millaa Road, while Old Palmerston Highway (East Evelyn Road – State Route 24) continues south and then west as a Tourist Drive (not suitable for caravans) to where it meets the Kennedy Highway north of Ravenshoe.

== History ==
The highway was closed in December 2023 after Cyclone Jasper brought landslips, debris and significant damage from heavy rain. It was expected to have one lane operational open from mid-February.

== See also ==
- Highways in Australia
- List of highways in Queensland
