= Goondi Bend, Queensland =

Goondi Bend
- Suburb
- Interactive map of Goondi Bend
- Coordinates: 17.5219°S 146.0080°E
- Country: Australia
- State: Queensland
- City: Innisfail
- LGA: Cassowary Coast Region
- Location: 2.9 km (1.8 mi) W of Innsifail; 85.1 km (52.9 mi) SSE of Cairns; 262 km (163 mi) NNW of Townsville; 1,611 km (1,001 mi) NNW of Brisbane

Government
  - State electorate: Hill
  - Federal division: Kennedy

Area
  - Total: 2.5 km^{2} (0.97 sq mi)

Population
  - Total: 570 (2021 census)
  - Density: 228/km^{2} (591/sq mi)
- Time zone: UTC+10:00 (AEST)
- Postcode: 4860
Suburbs around Goondi Bend
Goondi	Goondi	Cullinane
Hudson	Goondi Bend	Goondi Hill
Hudson	Bamboo Creek	Goondi Hill

Goondi Bend is a mixed-use locality in the Cassowary Coast Region, Queensland, Australia. In the 2021 census, Goondi Bend had a population of 570 people.

== Geography ==
The Bruce Highway (known locally as Palmerston Drive) enters the locality from the south-east (Goondi Hill) and exits to the west (Belvedere/Goondi).

The North Coast railway line enters from the east (Goondi Hill) and forms the north-east boundary of the locality, exiting to the north (Goondi / Sundown).

The land use is a mix of residential and crop growing, including sugarcane.

== History ==
The name Goondi is thought to be an Aboriginal word meaning elbow.

Goondi Provisional School opened on 17 February 1898. On 1 January 1909, it became Goondi State School. It was originally located on the south side of Goondi Mill Road in Goondi, but, by 1974, had relocated to the school's present location in Goondi Bend.

== Demographics ==
In the 2016 census, Goondi Bend had a population of 594 people.

In the 2021 census, Goondi Bend had a population of 570 people.

== Education ==
Goondi State School is a government primary (Prep-6) school for boys and girls at 78 Maple Street (17.5228°S 146.0099°E). In 2017, the school had an enrolment of 374 students with 26 teachers (24 full-time equivalent) and 23 non-teaching staff (14 full-time equivalent). In 2018, the school had an enrolment of 359 students with 24 teachers (23 full-time equivalent) and 22 non-teaching staff (14 full-time equivalent).

There are no secondary schools in Goondi Bend. The nearest government secondary school is Innisfail State College in Innisfail Estate to the east.
