= Shire of Johnstone =

Coordinates: 17°31′20″S 146°01′41″E

- Local government area
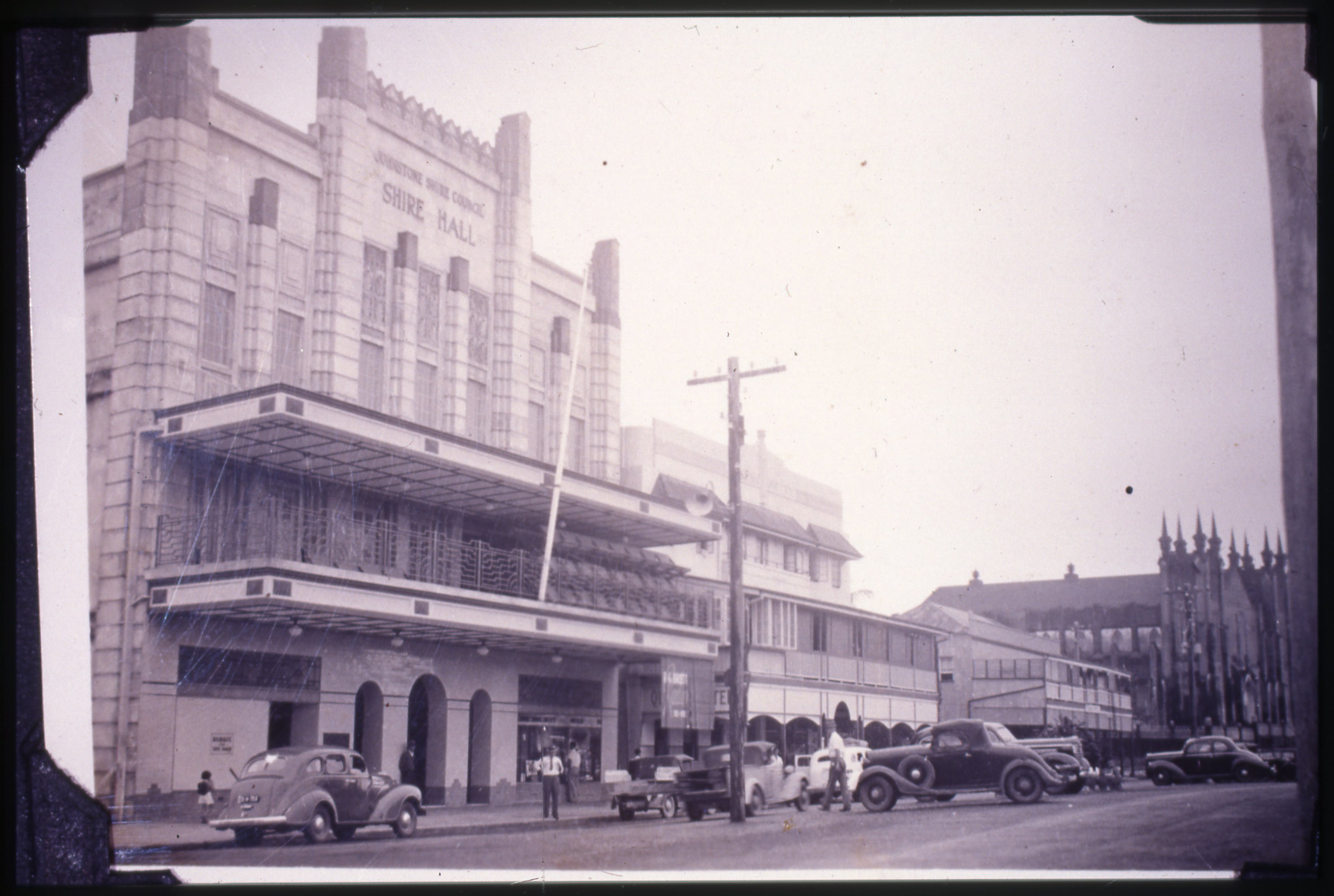
- Johnstone Shire Hall, circa 1940

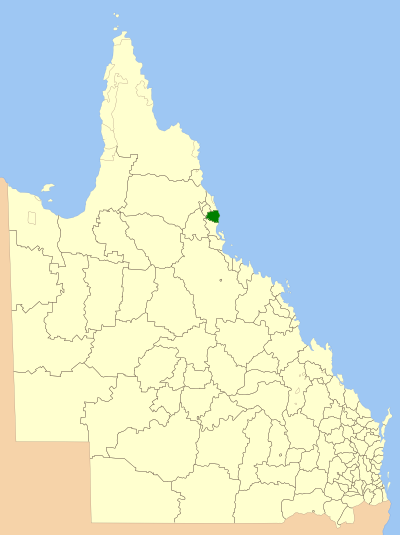
- Location within Queensland
- Country: Australia
- State: Queensland
- Region: Far North Queensland
- Established: 1881
- Council seat: Innisfail

Area
  - Total: 1,639.1 km^{2} (632.9 sq mi)

Population
  - Total: 18,256 (2006 census)
  - Density: 11.1378/km^{2} (28.8468/sq mi)
LGAs around Shire of Johnstone
Eacham	Cairns	Coral Sea
Eacham	Shire of Johnstone	Coral Sea
Herberton	Cardwell	Coral Sea

The Shire of Johnstone was a local government area of Queensland. It was located on the Coral Sea coast about 90 kilometres (56 mi) south of the city of Cairns. The shire, administered from the town of Innisfail, covered an area of 1,639.1 square kilometres (632.9 sq mi), and existed as a local government entity from 1881 until 2008, when it amalgamated with the Shire of Cardwell to form the Cassowary Coast Region.

The Mamu tribal group are the traditional owners of much of the land in the shire. 47% of the shire is in the Wet Tropics World Heritage Area.

== History ==
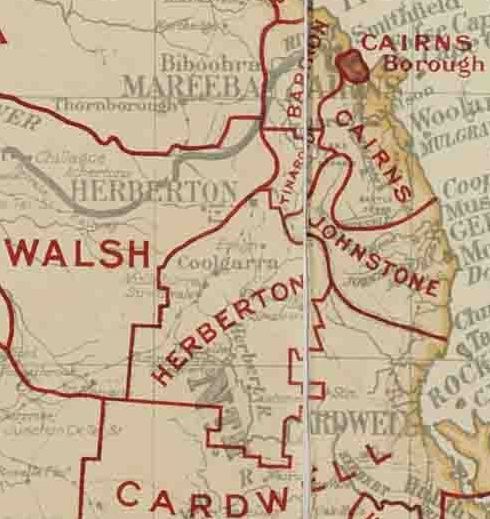
Map of Johnstone Division and adjacent local government areas, March 1902

The Hinchinbrook Division was established on 11 November 1879 as one of 74 divisions throughout Queensland under the Divisional Boards Act 1879. The Johnstone Division separated from it on 28 October 1881.

The Johnstone Division then became the Shire of Johnstone on 31 March 1903, following the enactment of the Local Authorities Act 1902.

Later, on 22 November 1910 a section of the Johnstone Shire was amalgamated with part of Cairns Shire (1903-1995)] and part of Tinaroo Shire to create the Shire of Eacham.

In December 1932, a fire destroyed the Johnstone Shire Hall. Although there was a push to rebuild promptly, it was not until 1938 that the new building was completed. The 1938 Johnstone Shire Hall is currently included on the Queensland Heritage Register.

With every elected councillor being a candidate of the Ratepayers Party, the election of councillors in May 1943 created a sensation, ousting 7 Labor Party councillors.

The Johnstone Shire Council was dismissed on 8 February 2007 by the Queensland Government's Local Minister, Andrew Fraser claiming the shire council had become ineffective due to internal conflict, inappropriate behaviour and financial problems, despite an issued show cause presented on 2 August 2006.

Among the perceived gross misconduct were the following incidents:

- The purchase of a $250,000 Steinway Model D Piano with insurance money from Cyclone Larry.
- Former Deputy Mayor George Pervan was quoted during an interview on commercial radio in the aftermath of Cyclone Larry, requesting Southern Queenslanders to:

"Send up a truckload of piss so we can all get fucking drunk" – George Pervan – 2006.

While two councillors attempted to get the Queensland Government to revoke the decision Andrew Fraser stated that while the action was regrettable, it was indeed the correct decision.

On 15 March 2008, under the Local Government (Reform Implementation) Act 2007 passed by the Parliament of Queensland on 10 August 2007, the Shire of Johnstone merged with the Shire of Cardwell to form the Cassowary Coast Region.

== Towns and localities ==
The Shire of Cardwell included the following settlements:

Greater Innisfail area:

- Innisfail
  - Belvedere
  - Eaton
  - East Innisfail
  - Eubenangee^{1}
  - Goondi
  - Goondi Bend
  - Goondi Hill
  - Hudson
  - Innisfail Estate
  - Jubilee Heights
  - Mighell
  - Palmerston^{2}
  - Ngatjan^{1}
  - South Innisfail
  - Webb
  - Wooroonooran^{3}

Localities:

- Bingil Bay
- Comoon Loop
- Cowley
- Daradgee
- East Palmerston
- El Arish
- Etty Bay
- Flying Fish Point
- Garners Beach
- Garradunga
- Germantown
- Japoonvale
- Kurrimine Beach
- Mena Creek
- Midgeree Bar
- Mission Beach
- Moresby
- Mourilyan
- Mourilyan Harbour
- Mundoo
- Silkwood
- South Johnstone
- Wangan

^{1} - shared with Cairns Region
^{2} - shared with Tablelands Region
^{3} - shared with Cairns Region and Tablelands Region

== Population ==
Year	Population
1933	12,777
1947	12,265
1954	14,980
1961	15,784
1966	16,529
1971	15,878
1976	16,776
1981	17,438
1986	17,457
1991	19,184
1996	20,474
2001	19,511
2006	18,917

== Chairmen ==
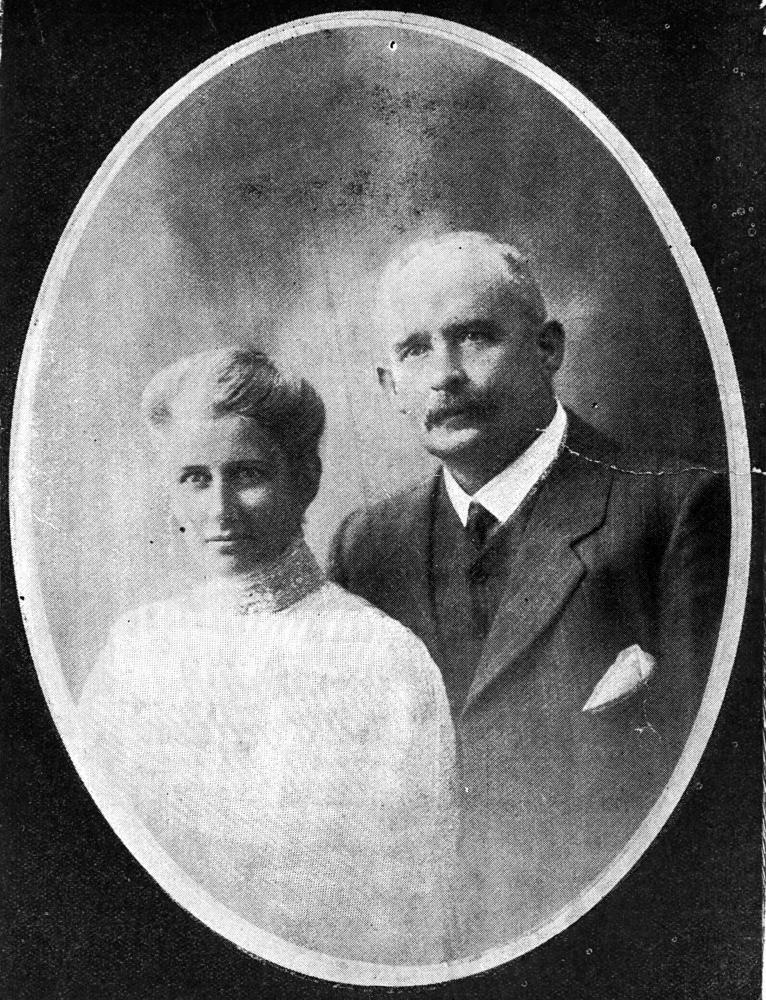
- Mr and Mrs Charles Edward Jodrell née Earl, 1907
  1883 F. E. Nash
- 1901: Henry Lawrence Gill
- 1903: Henry Lawrence Gill
- 1904: Timothy Dempsey
- 1907: Charles Edward Jodrell
- 1908: John Harvey Payne
- 1922—1923: Leontine Joseph Duffy
- 1927: Robert David Bliss
- 1929—1943: Clarence Stanley Kopsen Page
- 1950: Andrew John Murray Laurie

Other notable council members include:

- 1982—1985: Vicky Kippin, Member of the Queensland Legislative Assembly for Mourilyan

== See also ==
- List of tramways in Queensland
