= Comoon Loop, Queensland =

Comoon Loop
- Suburb
- Interactive map of Comoon Loop
- Coordinates: 17.5655°S 146.0341°E
- Country: Australia
- State: Queensland
- LGA: Cassowary Coast Region
- Location: 5.0 km (3.1 mi) S of Innisfail; 92.2 km (57.3 mi) S of Cairns; 255 km (158 mi) NNW of Townsville; 1,612 km (1,002 mi) NNW of Brisbane

Government
  - State electorate: Hill
  - Federal division: Kennedy

Area
  - Total: 2.3 km^{2} (0.89 sq mi)
- Elevation: 1 to 9 m (3.3 to 29.5 ft)

Population
  - Total: 44 (2021 census)
  - Density: 19.1/km^{2} (49.5/sq mi)
- Time zone: UTC+10:00 (AEST)
- Postcode: 4858
Suburbs around Comoon Loop
Mundoo	South Innisfail	Mourilyan
Mundoo	Comoon Loop	Mourilyan
Stockton	Mourilyan	Mourilyan

Comoon Loop is a rural locality in the Cassowary Coast Region, Queensland, Australia. In the 2021 census, Comoon Loop had a population of 44 people.

== Geography ==
The locality is bounded to the west by the South Johnstone River. The land is flat and low-lying at 1 to 9 metres (3 ft 3 in to 29 ft 6 in) above sea level.

The Bruce Highway enters the locality from the south (Mourilyan) and exits to the north (South Innisfail).

The predominant land use is growing sugarcane. There is a network of cane tramways to transport the harvested sugarcane to the local sugar mill.

== Demographics ==
In the 2016 census, Comoon Loop had a population of 51 people.

In the 2021 census, Comoon Loop had a population of 44 people.

== Education ==
There are no schools in Comoon Loop. The nearest government primary schools are Mourilyan State School in neighbouring Mourilyan to the south and Innisfail East State School in East Innisfail to the north. The nearest government secondary school is Innisfail State College in Innisfail Estate to the north.
