= Jubilee Heights, Queensland =

Jubilee Heights
- Suburb
- Interactive map of Jubilee Heights
- Coordinates: 17.4761°S 146.0377°E
- Country: Australia
- State: Queensland
- LGA: Cassowary Coast Region
- Location: 5.0 km (3.1 mi) NNE of Innisfail; 87.3 km (54.2 mi) S of Cairns; 264 km (164 mi) NNW of Townsville; 1,741 km (1,082 mi) NNW of Brisbane

Government
  - State electorate: Hill
  - Federal division: Kennedy

Area
  - Total: 12.4 km^{2} (4.8 sq mi)

Population
  - Total: 164 (2021 census)
  - Density: 13.23/km^{2} (34.25/sq mi)
- Postcode: 4860
Suburbs around Jubilee Heights
Garradunga	Eubenangee	Wanjuru
Daradgee	Jubilee Heights	Wanjuru
Sundown	Eaton	Coconuts

Jubilee Heights is a locality in the Cassowary Coast Region, Queensland, Australia. In the 2021 census, Jubilee Heights had a population of 164 people.

== Geography ==
The locality is bounded to the south-east by the Johnstone River. The land near the river is low-lying and is used for crop-growing with sugarcane and bananas being the main crops. There is also some grazing on native vegetation. The rest of the locality is more mountainous undeveloped land associated with the Seymour Range, rising to heights of 271 metres (889 ft) above sea level.

== Demographics ==
In the 2016 census, Jubilee Heights had a population of 143 people.

In the 2021 census, Jubilee Heights had a population of 164 people.

== Education ==
There are no schools in Jubilee Heights. The nearest government primary schools are Innisfail State School in Innisfail to the south and Flying Fish Point State School in Flying Fish Point to the south-east. The nearest government secondary school is Innisfail State College in Innisfail Estate to the south.

== Attractions ==
Geraldton Lookout is a high point on Jubilee Road with vistas in a number of directions (17.4954°S 146.0374°E).
