= Wanjuru, Queensland =

Wanjuru
- Suburb
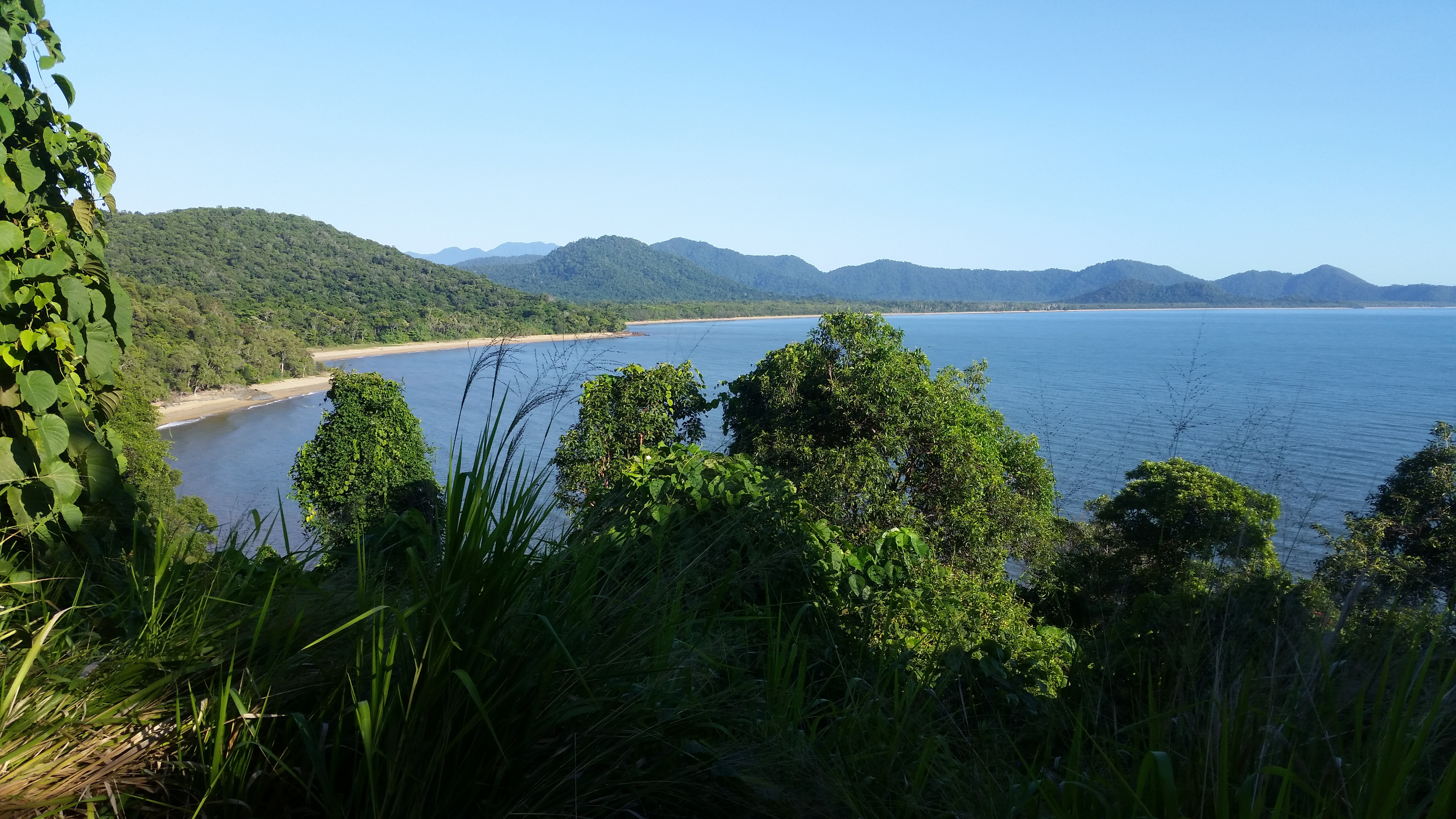
- Ella Bay from Heath Point, 2017

- Interactive map of Wanjuru
- Coordinates: 17.4500°S 146.0588°E
- Country: Australia
- State: Queensland
- LGA: Cassowary Coast Region
- Location: 4.6 km (2.9 mi) NNW of Flying Fish Point; 12.7 km (7.9 mi) NE of Innisfail; 100 km (62 mi) SSE of Cairns; 271 km (168 mi) NNW of Townsville; 1,627 km (1,011 mi) NNW of Brisbane

Government
  - State electorate: Hill
  - Federal division: Kennedy

Area
  - Total: 37.2 km^{2} (14.4 sq mi)

Population
  - Total: 0 (2021 census)
  - Density: 0.000/km^{2} (0.00/sq mi)
- Time zone: UTC+10:00 (AEST)
- Postcode: 4860
Suburbs around Wanjuru
Eubenangee	Eubenangee	Coral Sea
Eubenangee	Wanjuru	Coral Sea
Jubilee Heights	Coconuts	Flying Fish Point

Wanjuru is a coastal locality in the Cassowary Coast Region, Queensland, Australia. In the 2021 census, Wanjuru had "no people or a very low population".

== Geography ==
Wanjuru is bounded to the east by Ella Bay (17.4515°S 146.0674°E), a side bay of the Coral Sea.

The locality's south-west boundary approximately follows the ridge of the Seymour Range.

Wanjuru has the following mountains:

- Mount Annie (17.4807°S 146.0539°E), rising to 324 metres (1,063 ft) above sea level
- Mount Maria (17.4826°S 146.0701°E),294 metres (965 ft)

Heath Point is a headland on the coast (17.4794°S 146.0761°E).

Most of the northern, western and southern parts of the locality are within Ella Bay National Park which extends into neighbouring Eubenangee. The land in the north of the locality includes the Ella Bay Swamp. The land use in the east of the locality is predominantly grazing on native vegetation; there is also some marshland in this part of the locality.

Ella Beach Road is the main route into the locality, commencing at Flying Fish Point to the south-east.

== Demographics ==
In the 2016 census, Wanjuru had "no people or a very low population".

In the 2021 census, Wanjuru had "no people or a very low population".

== Education ==
There are no schools in Wanjuru. The nearest government primary school is Flying Fish Point State School in neighbouring Flying Fish Point to the south-east. The nearest government secondary school is Innisfail State College in Innisfail Estate to the south. There are also non-government schools in Innisfail and its suburbs.
