= Innisfail State High School =

School in Innisfail, Queensland, Australia

Location
- 2 Stitt Street; Innisfail, Queensland, 4860; Australia; 17°32′12.51″S 146°1′38.75″E

Information
- Type: State secondary day school
- Motto: Latin: Honor et Labore (Honour and Labour)
- Religious affiliation: Non-denominational
- Established: 1955
- Closed: 2009
- Authority: Department of Education (Queensland)
- Principal: Julie Pozzoli
- Staff: 56 (Teaching); 35 (Non-teaching)
- Year levels: Year 8 – Year 12
- Gender: Coeducational
- Enrolment: 722 (August 2009)
- Campus type: Outer Regional
- Colours: Green; White; Black
- Website: innisfailsc.eq.edu.au (Now Innisfail State College's website)

Innisfail (ISHS) was a high school situated in Innisfail (Queensland, Australia). The school was located in "Division 4" of the Cassowary Coast Regional Council local government area.

== Motto ==
The school's motto was the Latin phrase Honor Et Labore, which means "Honour and Labour" in English.

== Nomenclature ==
The school's name was derived from its location in the suburb of Innisfail. That suburb, and the adjacent suburbs of East Innisfail and Innisfail Estate, derived their names from their location, and proximity to the boundaries of the old town of Innisfail. The town was initially named Geraldton after the first settler, but in 1910, the government renamed it to Innisfail, due to confusion with Geraldton in Western Australia. That town derived its name from the name of the sugarcane plantation owned by Thomas Henry Fitzgerald, a sugarcane farmer who settled on local river frontage land and established the first European settlement in the region in 1880, which became a sugar-producing region. Innisfail is the poetic name for Ireland, meaning “Isle of Destiny”, based on the old Irish word for "Island of Fál" (Irish: Inis Fáil), a reference to the standing stone (Irish: Lia Fáil) at the Inauguration Mound (Irish: an Forrad) known as the "Stone of Destiny".

== History ==
=== Opening ===
The school opened on 24 January 1955.

=== Closure ===
The school suffered severe damage when the town was devastated by Cyclone Larry in 2006, necessitating the school to function using several demountable classrooms while it underwent substantial repair and rebuilding. Community consultation commenced in August 2007, and there was overwhelming community support for the relocation to the local TAFE (Technical and Further Education) site for the start of the 2010 year. For a more effective and efficient delivery of education services, in 2010, on 31 December 2009, the school closed and the Innisfail State College was formed by amalgamating the school with two other local educational institutions:

- Innisfail's state special school, then called the Inclusive Education Centre, but now called the Diverse Learning Centre
- Tropical North Queensland Institute of Technical and Further Education (TNQIT) (Innisfail Campus)

The college was officially opened on 28 February 2010 by the then Queensland Premier Anna Bligh and Queensland Education and Training Minister Geoff Wilson. The amalgamated college still operates on the old TAFE land as of 2025.

== Administration ==
=== Staff ===
In 2009, the final year of the school's operation, the school had a teaching staff of 56 (Full-time equivalent: 56) and a non-teaching staff of 35 (Full-time equivalent of 35).

=== Principals ===
Julie Pozzoli was Innisfail State High School's first and only female principal, arriving eight weeks before it was damaged by Cyclone Larry in 2006. Pozzoli remained the principal until the school's closure in 2009, becoming the founding principal of the newly-amalgamated Innisfail State College from 2010 to 2012.

== Students ==
=== Years ===
The school catered for Year 8 to Year 12.

=== Enrolments ===
The trend in student enrolments for the school's final few years was as follows:

Trend in total enrolment figures
| Year | Total | Ref |
|---|---|---|
| 2005 | 752 | |
| 2006 | 760 | |
| 2007 | 731 | |
| 2009 | 722 | |

== Notable alumni ==
| Alumni | Notability | Ref |
|---|---|---|
| Brett Anderson | Rugby league player | |
| Brent Cockbain | Cockbain is a former international rugby union player for Wales, whose games include the 2003 World Cup. | |
| Billy Slater | Slater is a renowned rugby league fullback who played for the Melbourne Storm (2003-2018) and represented Queensland in State of Origin (2004–2018) and Australia internationally. Slater is the current coach of the Queensland Maroons for the State of Origin series (2022 to 2025). | |
| Ty Williams | Williams is a former professional rugby league player with the North Queensland Cowboys (2002-2010) who also represented Queensland in State of Origin in 2005. | |

== See also ==
- List of schools in Far North Queensland
- Education in Queensland
- Queensland state schools
- History of state education in Queensland
- List of schools in Queensland
- Lists of schools in Australia
