= Sundown, Queensland (Cassowary Coast Region) =

Sundown
- Suburb
- Interactive map of Sundown
- Coordinates: 17.4980°S 146.0225°E
- Country: Australia
- State: Queensland
- LGA: Cassowary Coast Region
- Location: 3.3 km (2.1 mi) N of Innisfail; 88.3 km (54.9 mi) S of Cairns; 263 km (163 mi) NW of Townsville; 1,625 km (1,010 mi) NNW of Brisbane

Government
  - State electorate: Hill
  - Federal division: Kennedy

Area
  - Total: 6.0 km^{2} (2.3 sq mi)

Population
  - Total: 145 (2021 census)
  - Density: 24.17/km^{2} (62.6/sq mi)
- Time zone: UTC+10:00 (AEST)
- Postcode: 4860
Suburbs around Sundown
Daradgee	Jubilee Heights	Jubilee Heights
Goondi	Sundown	Eaton
Cullinane	Cullinane	Innisfail Estate

Sundown is a rural locality in the Cassowary Coast Region, Queensland, Australia. In the 2021 census, Sundown had a population of 145 people.

== Geography ==
The locality is bounded to the north and the east by the Johnstone River, to the south by See Poy and Frith Roads, and to the west by the North Coast railway line.

The elevation ranges from 10 to 30 metres (33 to 98 ft) above sea level. The land use is a mixture of growing sugarcane and rural residential housing. There is a network of cane tramways to transport the harvested sugarcane to the local sugar mill.

== History ==
In the 1880s, boats were used transfer goods from Flying Fish Point on the coast along the Johnstone River to Innisfail and beyond. Melanesian men worked on these boats and Sundown is the area where they were at the end of their working day, which gave the locality its name.

== Demographics ==
In the 2016 census, Sundown had a population of 178 people.

In the 2021 census, Sundown had a population of 145 people.

== Education ==
There are no schools in Sundown. The nearest government primary schools are Innisfail State School in Innisfail to the south and Goondi State School in Goondi Bend to the south-west. The nearest government secondary school is Innisfail State College in Innisfail Estate across the Johnstone River to the south-east.
