= South Innisfail, Queensland =

South Innisfail
- Suburb
- Interactive map of South Innisfail
- Coordinates: 17.5472°S 146.0458°E
- Country: Australia
- State: Queensland
- LGA: Cassowary Coast Region
- Location: 2.9 km (1.8 mi) S of Innisfail; 90.5 km (56.2 mi) SSE of Cairns; 257 km (160 mi) NNW of Townsville; 1,606 km (998 mi) NNW of Brisbane

Government
  - State electorate: Hill
  - Federal division: Kennedy

Area
  - Total: 7.0 km^{2} (2.7 sq mi)

Population
  - Total: 508 (2021 census)
  - Density: 72.6/km^{2} (188.0/sq mi)
- Time zone: UTC+10:00 (AEST)
- Postcode: 4860
Suburbs around South Innisfail
| East Innisfail | Webb | Coquette Point |
| Mighell | South Innisfail | Coquette Point |
| Mundoo | Comoon Loop | Mourilyan |

South Innisfail is a rural locality in the Cassowary Coast Region, Queensland, Australia. In the 2021 census, South Innisfail had a population of 508 people.

== Geography ==
The South Johnstone River forms the western boundary of the locality, while Ninds Creek forms the eastern boundary. Both are tributaries of the Johnstone River.

The Bruce Highway enters the locality from the south (Comoon Loop) and exits to the west (Mighell), crossing the South Johnstone River via the Centenary Bridge.

The land use in the north-west of the locality (beside the river and north of the highway) is suburban housing. The south-west of the locality is predominantly used to grow sugarcane. The east of the locality is used for grazing on native vegetation, apart from some areas of low-lying marshland.

== History ==
Radiant Life College opened in 1983 with 30 students. It was established by the local Indigenous church, Tabernacle of Yeshua Ministries, and was originally proposed by Anna Edwards, the great-grandmother of the 2023 school principal, Nathanael Edwards.

== Demographics ==
In the 2016 census, South Innisfail had a population of 506 people.

In the 2021 census, South Innisfail had a population of 508 people.

== Education ==
Radiant Life College is a private non-denominational Christian primary and secondary school (Prep–10) school for boys and girls at 1–5 Riley Street (17.5395°S 146.0348°E). In 2018, the school had an enrolment of 79 students with 5 teachers and 11 non-teaching staff.

There are no government schools in South Innisfail. The nearest government primary school is Innisfail East State School in neighbouring East Innisfail to the north. The nearest government secondary school is Innisfail State College in Innisfail Estate to the north.
