= Ella Bay National Park =

National park in Queensland, Australia

- IUCN category II (national park)
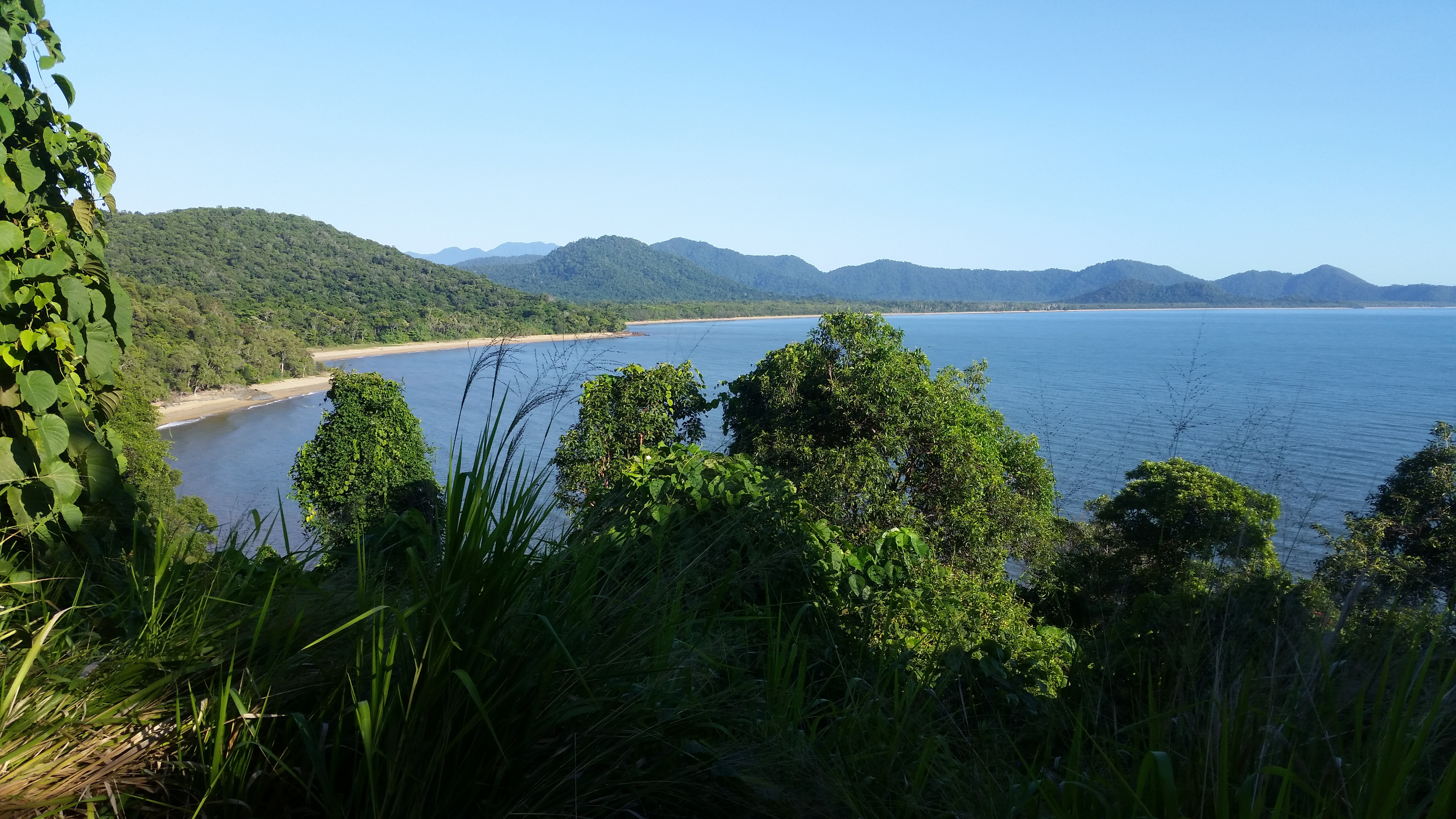
- Ella Bay from Heath Point, 2017

- Location within Queensland
- Location: Queensland
- Coordinates: 17.4355°S 146.05139°E
- Area: 37.10 km^{2} (14.32 sq mi)
- Established: 1952
- Governing body: Queensland Parks and Wildlife Service

Ella Bay is a national park beside Ella Bay and spans the localities of Wanjuru in the Cassowary Coast Region and Eubenangee in the Cairns Region, Queensland, Australia.

== Geography ==
The park is 1329 km northwest of Brisbane. It is part of the Coastal Wet Tropics Important Bird Area, identified as such by BirdLife International because of its importance for the conservation of lowland tropical rainforest birds. It can be reached via Flying Fish Point on Ella Bay Road. The largest and most prominent mountain in the park is Mount Arthur, which rises to 478 metres above sea level.

== Wildlife ==
394 species of animals and 462 species of plants have been recorded in Ella Bay National Park. Of these, 12 species of animals and 13 species of plants are rare or endangered.

== Amenities ==
Adjacent to the park are camping facilities which are closed as of 2017.

== See also ==
- Protected areas of Queensland
