= Jubilee Bridge (Innisfail) =

- Coordinates: 17°31′31″S 146°01′59″E
- Carries: Vehicle, bicycle and pedestrian traffic
- Crosses: South Johnstone River
- Locale: Innisfail, Queensland, Australia

Characteristics
- Width: 15.8 m (52 ft)

History
- Construction cost: A$21.6 million
- Opened: 3 September 2011
- Replaces: Jubilee Bridge (1923-2010)

The Jubilee Bridge spans the South Johnstone River connecting Innisfail and East Innisfail, Queensland, Australia. The bridge was constructed in 2011, replacing an earlier bridge built in 1923 which marked the 50th anniversary of the establishment of Innisfail.

== History ==
=== Johnstone River Ferry ===
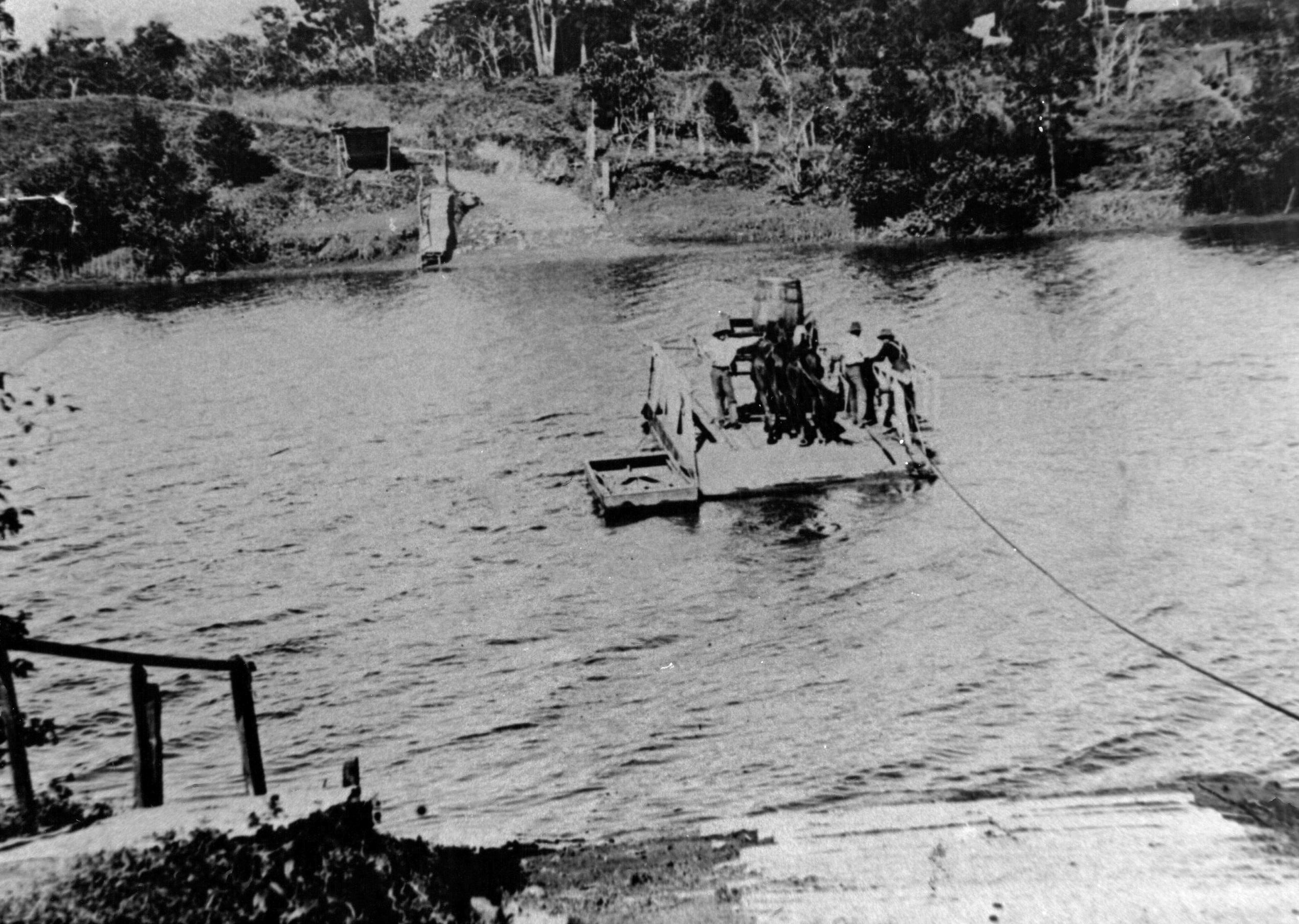
Johnstone River Ferry at Geraldton

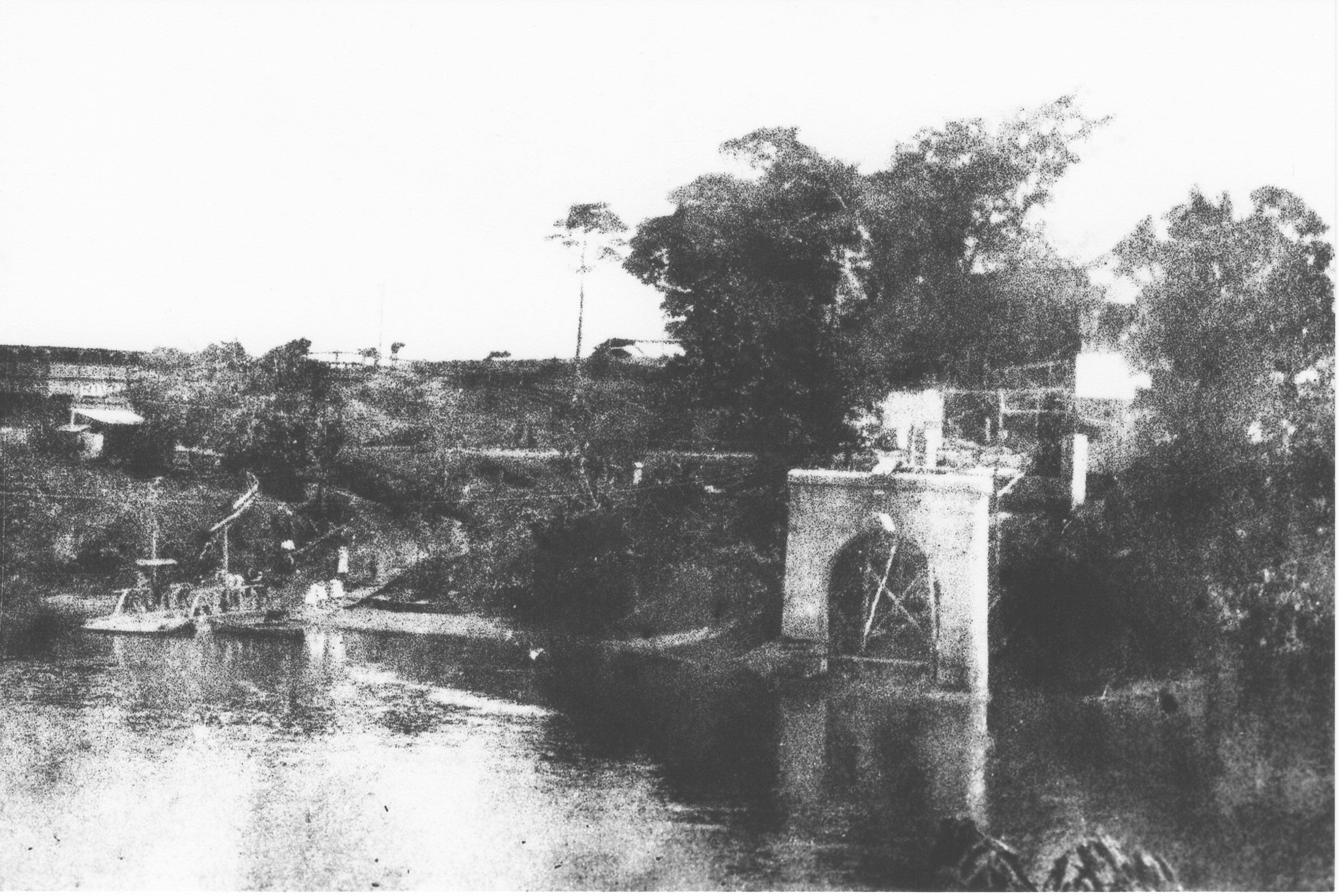
Early construction of the Jubilee Bridge

The idea of constructing a bridge in this location was first raised in 1907 by the Johnstone Shire Chairman, Charles Edward Joddrell. The emerging timber and agricultural industry was hampered by poor shipping service associated with difficulties maintaining the nearby harbour at Mourilyan. The proposal was met with fierce opposition within the community, and sparked an ongoing debate over the development of Mourilyan Harbour, and the merits of a connecting tramline to Geraldton Wharf – Geraldton being the earlier name for Innisfail.

The Queensland government had already promised funds for the construction of a bridge at the end of Rankin Street, and for some; the plan for a composite road and tramway bridge leading to East Geraldton from the ferry site became more important than the planned harbour facilities. Lack of bridges was a continuing problem for residents of the district. While the use of ferries was common, it was not without its share of accidents and tragedies.

Just as support for the bridge proposal appeared at its lowest, the last ferryman, Larry Breen – an East Geraldton resident – and his wife, scoured the district with a petition asking for the construction of the bridge.

=== Jubilee Bridge, 1923 ===
There were ongoing concerns regarding a loan to construct a bridge over the south branch of the river at Innisfail. In 1911 the Home secretary said the Shire must reduce its indebtedness in order for the Government to consider a fresh application next year.

The Jubilee Bridge was officially opened on 28 September 1923 by the Queensland Premier Ted Theodore who was driven in a car through the ribbon. The bridge was decorated with flags, streamers and palms. The Chairman of the Johnstone Shire Council, Leontine Joseph Duffy, announced the bridge had cost £32,000 of which £20,000 was spent in Innisfail. One of the bridge piers was 72 feet (22 m) deep, the deepest on any traffic bridge in Australia.

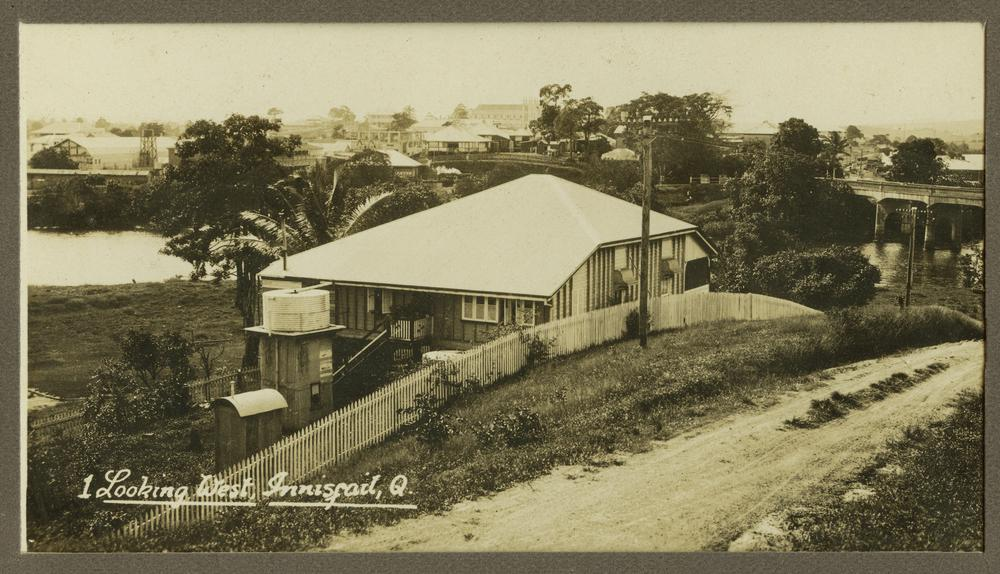
Looking west towards town and the bridge, Innisfail, 1930

However, with a few years, the bridge showed signs of sinking with a report by engineers confirming subsidence of the piers in 1928. A 4-tonne (4-short-ton) weight limit was introduced on the bridge. Repairs costing £2000 were required.

As there was no footbridge, there were soon demands from as early as 1933 for a footbridge to be added to separate the pedestrians from the vehicles and horses. However, it was not until 1940 that the Shire Council attempted to borrow £7140 for the Queensland Government to fund bridge strengthening and the addition of a footbridge. Funding must not have been available as it was not until 1949 that the council attempted to build the footbridge but was then unable to obtain the required steel in post-World War II Australia. In 1952, another engineer's report suggested that the bridge was nearing the end of its life and the loan funds to be expended to do more repairs to keep the bridge open, while plans and funding were sought to build a replacement bridge.

However, no replacement bridge was built and by February 2010, Councillor Bill Shannon announced that the bridge was sinking at a time when adequate funding for a new bridge was uncertain. The Jubilee Bridge was closed on 21 May 2010 after a review found the bridge to be unsafe. The bridge's closure created a 6 kilometres (3.7 mi) detour for those travelling between Innisfail and East Innisfail.

== Jubilee Bridge, 2011 ==
The new bridge was opened on 3 September 2011 with a ceremony attended by the then Premier, Anna Bligh, Queensland MP, Curtis Pitt and local Mayor Bill Shannon. The new bridge faithfully reproduces the Art deco features of the original bridge.
