= Innisfail Water Tower =

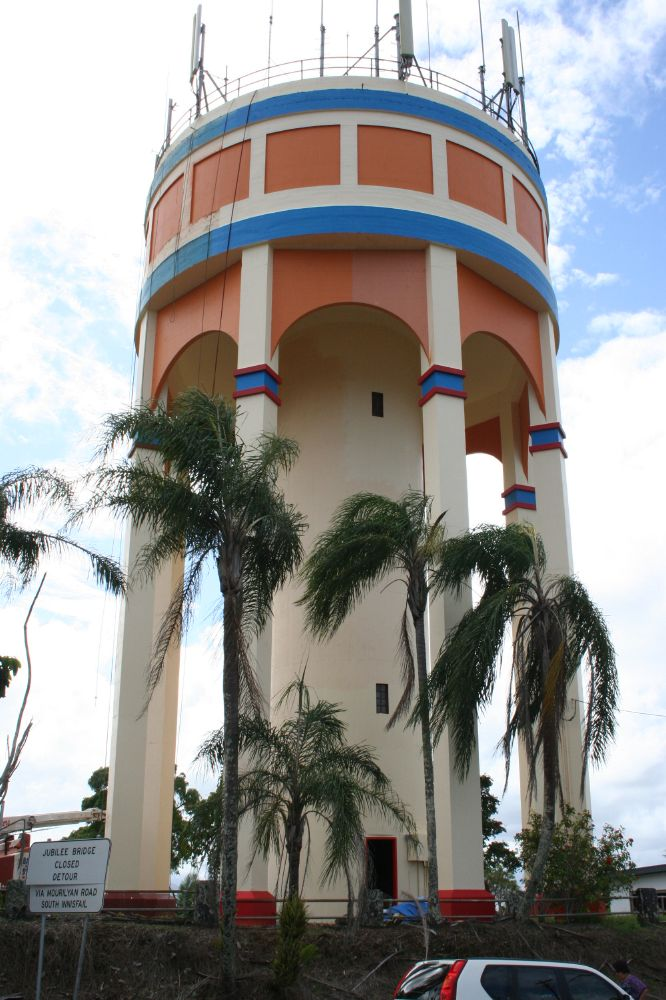
- Innisfail Water Tower, 2010

- Location within Queensland Location within Australia
- 17.5286°S 146.0343°E
- Location: Mourilyan Street, East Innisfail, Cassowary Coast Region, Queensland, Australia

History
- Built: 1933–1934

Site notes
- Architectural style: Art Deco

Queensland Heritage Register
- Official name: Innisfail Water Tower
- Type: state heritage (built)
- Designated: 6 August 2010
- Reference no.: 602757
- Significant period: Interwar Period
- Builders: Van Leeuwen Brothers

Innisfail Water Tower is a heritage-listed water tower at Mourilyan Street, East Innisfail, Cassowary Coast Region, Queensland, Australia. It was built from 1933 to 1934 by Van Leeuwen Brothers. It was added to the Queensland Heritage Register on 6 August 2010.

== History ==
The Innisfail Water Tower was built during 1933 and 1934 and was part of a significant infrastructure project in one of Queensland's most important sugar-growing regions. Designed by the Irrigation and Water Supply Sub-Department of the Queensland Lands Department, it is situated on Mellick's Hill at East Innisfail from where it is visible from all parts of the town of Innisfail making it an important landmark.

In the early 1930s Innisfail was the principal town in the Johnstone Shire and an important regional service centre in one of its major sugar-producing districts. Thomas Henry Fitzgerald is credited with the town's establishment, attracted to the area because of its potential for growing sugar. With financial backing from Brisbane, he selected his Innisfail Estate in June 1880 along the Johnstone River where the present town is located. News of Fitzgerald's venture attracted other sugar companies and within four years there were three mills operating in the district. Although Fitzgerald's venture was unsuccessful, his role was recognised when in 1883 a town was surveyed and named Geraldton. The name was changed to Innisfail in 1910.

By the turn of the century clearing for the town was continuing and new buildings were being erected, often in timber and iron to replace older ones. Lodges and societies were established, as were businesses including an aerated water factory, two bakers, a butcher and three new hotels. The waterfront was lined with wharves, two sawmills were established on the banks of the river and there was a ferry service across the South Johnstone River, it being the only effective way in and out of town.

While the sugar industry was fuelling the growth of the area, the greatest impact on Innisfail's landscape came from the major floods and cyclones of the period. The 1918 Innisfail cyclone was particularly severe and destroyed most of the buildings in the town. A large proportion of the rebuilding which took place during the 1920s and 1930s – a period of prosperity – was done using reinforced concrete to prevent such levels of destruction during future cyclonic events.

Investigation and planning for a water supply scheme for Innisfail commenced in 1926. Up until this time the community relied on tank water and water vendors, and despite being one of the wettest towns in Australia in terms of rainfall, there were water shortages during the dry months of the year. In 1930 the Irrigation and Water Supply Sub-Department of the Queensland Lands Department explored options and prepared designs for a gravity scheme relying on supply from Fisher's Creek; however the Shire did not pursue funding for it until 1932 when they renewed their application. Councillor Clarence Stanley Kopsen Page, Chairman of the Johnstone Shire Council and Secretary of the Chamber of Commerce at the time, was a strong advocate for the scheme, which he argued would allow the formation of a fire brigade, improve public health, allow drains and streets to be flushed as well as providing water for households and public gardens. The local newspaper, the Johnstone River Advocate, reported in August of that year that a prolonged dry spell had resulted in motor traffic causing "... miniature desert storms on the dusty roads".

Council's new funding application for a water supply scheme resulted in the Queensland Treasurer approving a subsidy of £15,500 plus a loan of £30,750. This new application precipitated debate about the extent of the scheme, and alternative sources of water, dissent about these matters being aired at a public meeting at the end of 1932 where alternative schemes were recommended and a petition was started. These alternative schemes were based on the opinion of a former shire engineer and some people within the community who thought savings could be made by tapping into natural springs rather than pumping from the North Johnstone River, thereby reducing the size of some of the piping. The need for a filtration plant was also questioned. The Irrigation and Water Supply Sub-Department formally responded to the criticisms of the scheme: confirming that the estimated daily consumption and cost of the scheme were comparable with water supply schemes elsewhere, and explaining that the Johnstone River would provide the most reliable water source.

The Innisfail Water Supply Scheme formed part of a Queensland Government town water supply program funded through the Lands Department's works for unemployment relief effort. The scheme was conditional on the use of local labour and materials and the transportation of materials by rail. The Minister for Lands reported on the success of the government's employment initiative, which had provided loans and subsidy of £210,673 to fourteen local authorities for the installation of town water supplies, and meant that in January 1934 there were 525 men directly employed. The initiative was also indirectly helping those firms supplying the materials needed for the construction of town water supply schemes.

The scheme for Innisfail differed from its proposed scheme of the 1920s in that it supplied a larger area and incorporated a filtration plant, which was considered best practice and important for preventing bacterial disease. It also comprised a low level pumping plant with two electrically powered vertical centrifugal pumps located at Stoter's farm on the Johnstone River, a filtration plant with two horizontal pumps located half a mile from the pumping plant, a 100,000-imperial-gallon (450,000 L; 120,000 US gal) water tower on Mellick's Hill at East Innisfail and a reticulation network to distribute water throughout the town. The scheme included provision of electricity to both the pumping and filtration plants from the Shire's power station.

By February 1933 tenders had been invited for construction of the Innisfail pumping station and reticulation network. These were just two components of the total system which for construction purposes was divided into a number of separate tenders. With the arrival of supervising engineer Mr Mulholland in late April, the ceremonial turning of the first sod to commence construction of the scheme was held on Saturday 22 April 1933 at Stoter's Farm. Councillor Page proclaimed in Johnstone River Advocate the commencement of the scheme as a positive step in the district's progress and possibly the biggest project the district had ever seen.

Work on the pumping station and laying pipes was already underway when eight tenders were received for contract No. 7, involving the construction of the 100,000-imperial-gallon (450,000 L; 120,000 US gal) reinforced concrete water tower at East Innisfail. Tenders ranged between £6898 and £5100 and were received from as far away as Bundaberg. In June 1933 the Van Leeuwen Bros were awarded the contract with a tender of £5186/16/-, having arrived in Innisfail from Baarn in the Netherlands in 1918. They went on to become one of the most successful construction companies in the town, being responsible for construction of the National Bank, Hotel Grand Central, Queens Hotel, Bank of New South Wales, Commonwealth Bank, Shire Hall as well as the water tower.

Over the next thirteen months the progress of the water tower was regularly reported in the Johnstone River Advocate. In December 1933, a total of 19 men were employed, 14 full-time and 5 part-time. The columns had been concreted to a height of 14 feet (4.3 m), the central tower to 21 feet (6.4 m), with the 27-foot (8.2 m) high second staging in preparation of a second lift of the columns. In January the columns were raised to a height of 29.5 feet (9.0 m), the central tower to 35 feet (11 m) and the pipes and valve pit in the tower had been set in place and tested. Despite being affected by heavy rain in April, the final concrete pour had been made to the top of the splay under the bottom of the tank, and the floor of the tank, consisting of 200 long tons (200 t) of concrete, was put down in a continuous pour that lasted for 19 hours. On 18 May 1934, 21 local men concreted the wall of the tank which was 13 feet (4.0 m) high with a circumference of 134 feet (41 m) in a process that took 27 hours. By 6 June the dome of the tank was completed, again in one continuous pour. At 42 feet (13 m) in diameter, it was one of the largest reinforced concrete domes in Queensland. All that was required to finish the job was coating the inside with bitumen and completing the parapet walls and lookout. It is not known if the current paint scheme matches the tower's original exterior finish.

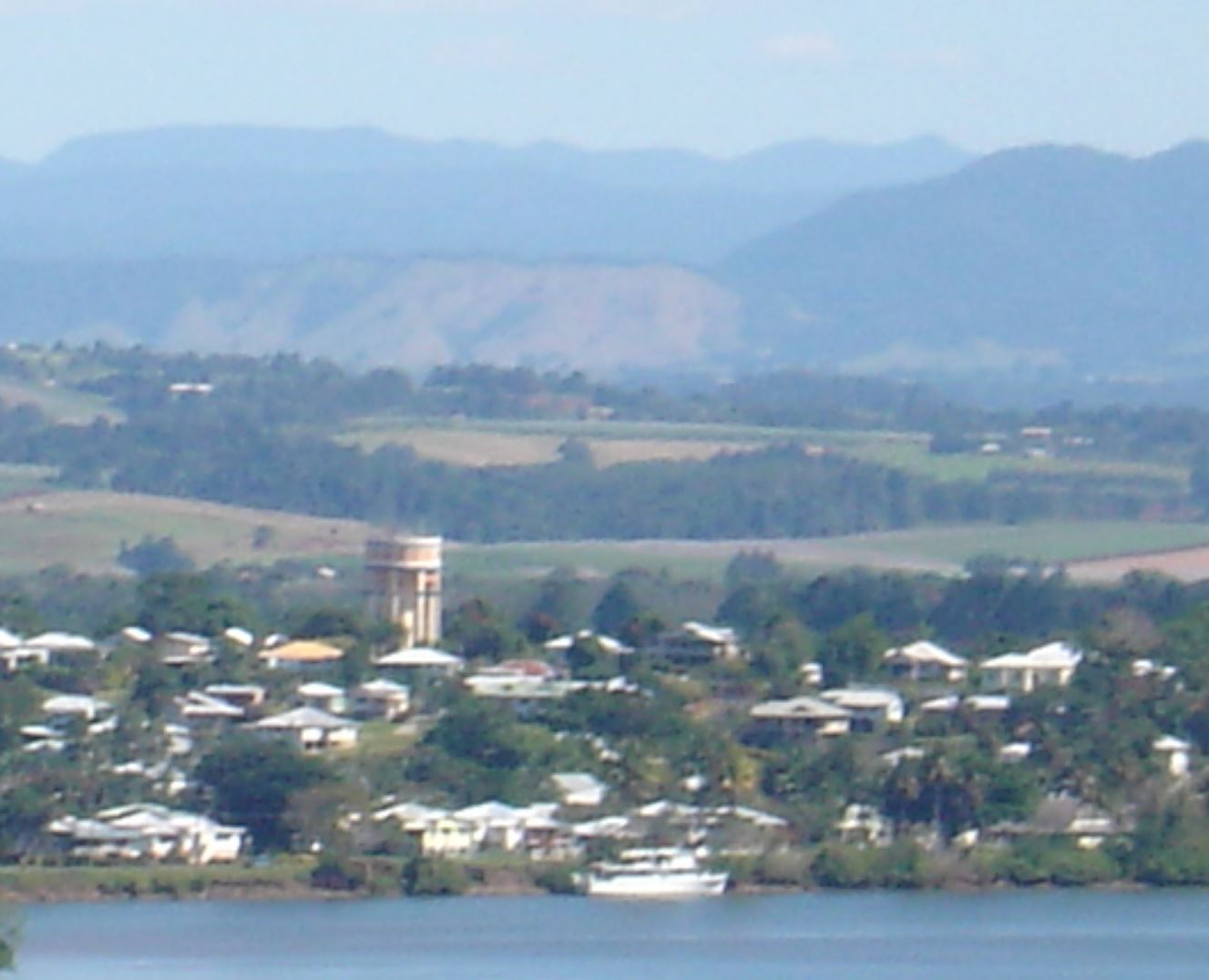
Innisfail Water Tower, a landmark in Innisfail, 2005

During the early stages of construction there was some discussion about taking advantage of the visual prominence of the structure. Advertising and a town clock were suggested; however the Shire Council decided on a lookout, the guard rail for which was erected shortly after the dome on the tank was completed. The tower was painted but the Council decided it would be too costly to illuminate.

Although construction of the filtration plant had only just commenced, on Monday 27 August 1934, following testing of the system, the first property – Oroya Private Hospital in Rankin Street – was connected to the system. The availability of a reticulated water supply system also meant that the Volunteer Fire Brigade was also able to commence.

Construction of the filtration plant continued into 1935 as did connections to properties. It was not until 16 December that the water supply system was officially handed over to the Johnstone Shire Council. At which time there were 548 properties connected to it pumping 200,000 imperial gallons (910,000 L; 240,000 US gal) per day supplying 2500 people.

The annual report of the Water Supply Branch of the Irrigation and Water Supply Sub-Department for the year 1933–1934 reported that "...the Water Tower forms a dignified structure of imposing appearance overlooking the town. Throughout the construction of the scheme particular care had been taken to obtain concrete structures of pleasing appearance."

The Water Supply Branch was very active during the 1930s. In 1933–1934 they funded 41 projects, 22 of these being for town water supply schemes. During the 1930s, 15 of the schemes constructed included an elevated reinforced concrete water tower. Tanks were predominantly 60,000 or 100,000 to 120,000 imperial gallons (270,000 or 450,000 to 550,000 L; 72,000 or 120,000 to 144,000 US gal) in size, with Innisfail being the first 100,000-imperial-gallon (450,000 L; 120,000 US gal) tank as reported in the 1930s annual reports. The increase to this size appears to correspond to a transition to using supporting columns as well as the central tower. The tower at Emerald constructed in the early 1930s consisted of a concrete cylindrical tank on a central tower while the Gordonvale tower built in 1934 consisted of a cylindrical tank on columns; both were 60,000 imperial gallons (270,000 L; 72,000 US gal) tanks. The towers at Gatton, Innisfail, Longreach and Ingham have both a central tower and surrounding columns. The taller of these towers also have bracing between the columns at mid height, which is not present on the Innisfail tower. The towers at Innisfail and Ingham have capitals on the columns, while the Innisfail tower also has decorative panels around its tank walls.

== Description ==
Located on the top of a hill in Mourilyan Road on the east side of the Johnstone River, the Innisfail Water Tower is a prominent feature on the skyline, its stylistic influences strongly reflecting the Art Deco character of a number of other buildings in Innisfail. Surrounded by palm trees and a low masonry fence with iron railing, the reinforced concrete structure comprises a circular tank supported on a central cylindrical tower and eight rectangular section columns.

The tank wall is embellished with a continuous parapet moulding and recessed panels. Beneath the tank, arched reinforced concrete splays span between the columns. The columns are accentuated at the springing line of the splays with two rows of rectangular moulding forming decorative capitals and with plinths at their base. The current paint scheme distinguishes various components of the exterior using pale yellow as a base colour detailed with a teal blue, terracotta orange and red.

Having originally incorporated a lookout, the Innisfail Water Tower still has views over the region. Within the central tower, a half-turn stair with equal flights, constructed of concrete with a tubular metal handrail and balustrade, provides access to the tank. Three eight-light fixed metal-framed windows provide natural light to the stair landings. The concrete interior surfaces are unpainted.

The balustrade around the edge of the tank top is made of tubular metal and currently supports aerials for local telecommunications companies. A frame of similar materials covers a central circular opening where a ladder from below provides access to the dome. The concrete on the dome is largely unpainted.

== Heritage listing ==
Innisfail Water Tower was listed on the Queensland Heritage Register on 6 August 2010 having satisfied the following criteria.

The place is important in demonstrating the evolution or pattern of Queensland's history.

Constructed in 1933–1934, the Innisfail Water Tower is associated with the early development of Innisfail's water supply infrastructure and is important in demonstrating the era of prosperity accompanying the expansion of the north Queensland sugar industry during the 1920s and 1930s and the success of the Queensland government's town water supply programs funded by the Lands Department under the auspices of its unemployment relief scheme during the 1930s. Civic projects - including water supply schemes, shire and town halls, offices and chambers, community swimming pools, roads, bridges, and street and park beautification schemes - were undertaken throughout Queensland at this period as a result of the scheme, and as a group these places are important in illustrating: a particular historical period; the impact of State government initiatives to combat the economic depression; and design concepts popular at the time.

The place is important in demonstrating the principal characteristics of a particular class of cultural places.

The Innisfail Water Tower is a good and intact example of a 1930s reinforced concrete water tower, one of 15 constructed in Queensland during that period. Designed by the Irrigation and Water Supply Sub-Department of the Lands Department, it incorporates both central tower and surrounding support columns which were used on larger towers from the mid-1930s. As well as being one of the first towers with both a central tower and columns, at the time of construction the dome top on the water tank was one of the largest in the state.

The place is important because of its aesthetic significance.

The Innisfail Water Tower is a distinctive landmark visible from all parts of Innisfail. At the time of construction it was described as a dignified structure of imposing presence overlooking the town. Through the unemployment relief schemes, a conscious effort was made to produce concrete structures of pleasing appearance and the Innisfail Water Tower well illustrates the design elements, reflecting interwar Modernist concerns with functional simplicity, believed to impart this value.
