= Eaton, Queensland =

Eaton
- Suburb
- Interactive map of Eaton
- Coordinates: 17.5058°S 146.0455°E
- Country: Australia
- State: Queensland
- LGA: Cassowary Coast Region
- Location: 3.4 km (2.1 mi) NE of Innisfail; 91 km (57 mi) S of Cairns; 262 km (163 mi) NNW of Townsville; 1,611 km (1,001 mi) NNW of Brisbane

Government
  - State electorate: Hill
  - Federal division: Kennedy

Area
  - Total: 3.2 km^{2} (1.2 sq mi)

Population
  - Total: 47 (2021 census)
  - Density: 14.7/km^{2} (38.0/sq mi)
- Time zone: UTC+10:00 (AEST)
- Postcode: 4860
Suburbs around Eaton
Sundown	Jubilee Heights	Coconuts
Sundown	Eaton	Coconuts
Innisfail Estate	Innisfail Estate	Coconuts

Eaton is a rural locality in the Cassowary Coast Region, Queensland, Australia. In the 2021 census, Eaton had a population of 47 people.

== Geography ==
The Johnstone River forms the western boundary of the locality.

The Carello Palm Swamp Conservation Park is in the east of the locality. Apart from this protected area, the land use in the western part of the locality is growing sugarcane and bananas, while the eastern part of the locality is mostly used for grazing on native vegetation.

== History ==
In 1992, the Queensland Government proclaimed Carello Palm Swamp Regional Park as an environmental park and in 1994 it was proclaimed as a conservation park.

Johnstone River Crocodile Park was a tourist attraction on Flying Fish Road (17.5050°S 146.0451°E).

== Demographics ==
In the 2016 census, Eaton had a population of 47 people.

In the 2021 census, Eaton had a population of 47 people.

== Education ==
There are no schools in Eaton. The nearest government primary schools are Innisfail State School in Innisfail to the south-west and Flying Fish Point State School in Flying Fish Point to the east. The nearest government secondary school is Innisfail State College in neighbouring Innisfail Estate to the south.
