= Coconuts, Queensland =

Coconuts
- Suburb
- Interactive map of Coconuts
- Coordinates: 17.5033°S 146.0636°E
- Country: Australia
- State: Queensland
- LGA: Cassowary Coast Region
- Location: 5.8 km (3.6 mi) NE of Innisfail; 93.4 km (58.0 mi) SSE of Cairns; 264 km (164 mi) NNW of Townsville; 1,622 km (1,008 mi) NNW of Brisbane
- Established: 1984

Government
  - State electorate: Hill
  - Federal division: Kennedy

Area
  - Total: 2.1 km^{2} (0.81 sq mi)

Population
  - Total: 216 (2021 census)
  - Density: 102.9/km^{2} (266/sq mi)
- Postcode: 4860
Suburbs around Coconuts
| Jubilee Heights | Wanjuru | Flying Fish Point |
| Eaton | Coconuts | Flying Fish Point |
| Innisfail Estate | Coquette Point | Coral Sea |

Coconuts is a coastal locality in the Cassowary Coast Region, Queensland, Australia. In the 2021 census, Coconuts had a population of 216 people.

== Geography ==
The locality is bounded to the south by the Johnstone River and to the south-east by the Coral Sea.

Coconut Point is a headland at the northern mouth of the river into the sea (17.5077°S 146.0644°E) and presumably the origin of the locality name.

== History ==
The locality was officially named on 17 March 1984.

== Demographics ==
In the 2016 census, Coconuts had a population of 224 people.

In the 2021 census, Coconuts had a population of 216 people.

== Education ==
There are no schools in Coconuts. The nearest government primary school is Flying Fish Point State School in neighbouring Flying Fish Point to the east. The nearest government secondary school is Innisfail State College in neighbouring Innisfail Estate to the south-east.
