= Barrier Reef Institute of TAFE =

Barrier Reef Institute of TAFE was a government-owned Technical and Further Education college with 17 campuses across North Queensland, Australia. It catered to domestic and international markets with a wide range of academic programs at the Certificate and Diploma levels. The TAFE catered for approximately over 14,700 students from regional, national and international level.

In 2013, Barrier Reef Institute of TAFE merged with Tropical North Queensland TAFE to form TAFE Queensland North.

== Notable students ==
- Gail Mabo, 2004–2007
