= Coquette Point, Queensland =

Coquette Point
- Suburb
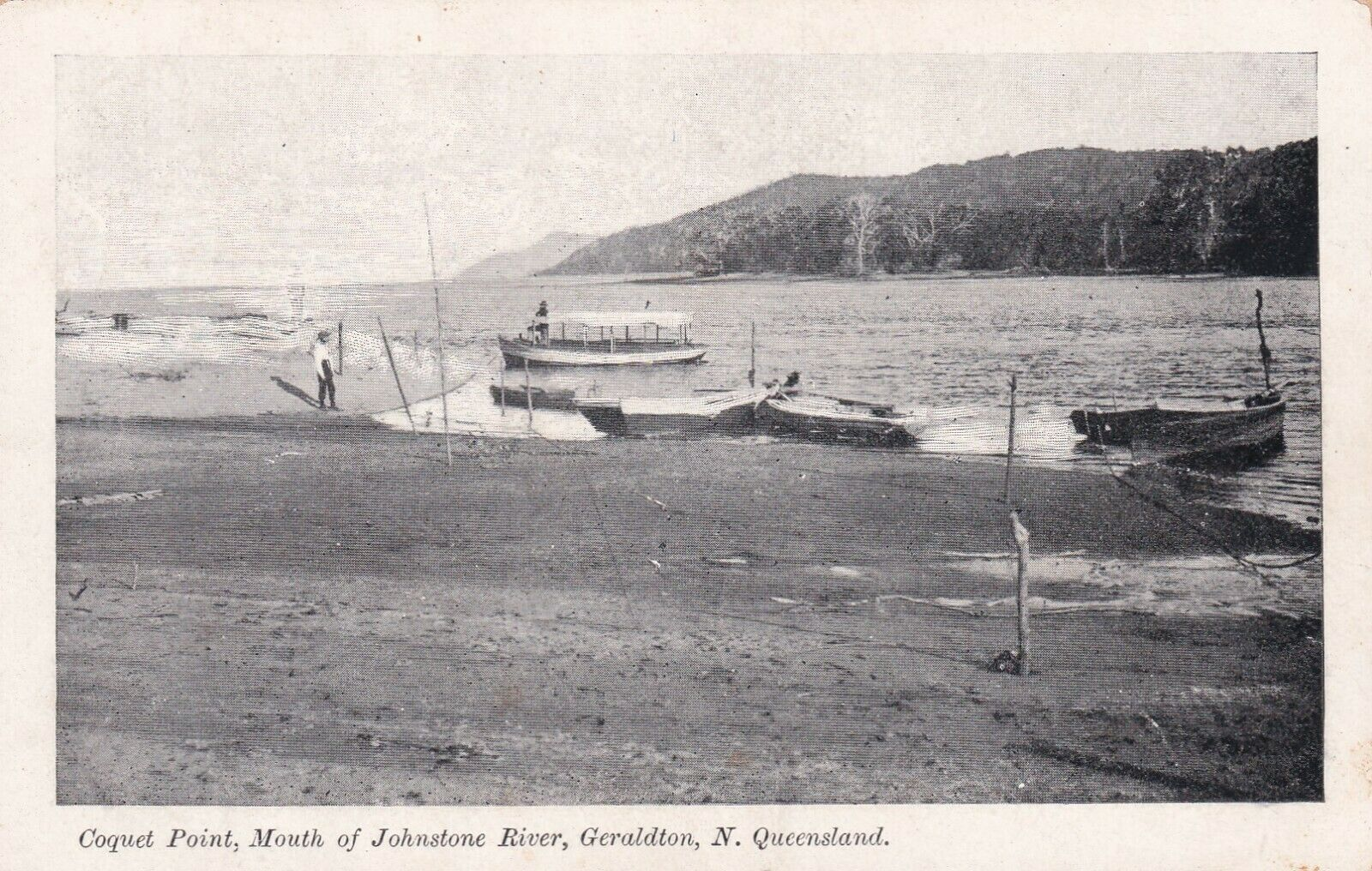
- Coquette Point, mouth of Johnstone River, circa 1908

- Interactive map of Coquette Point
- Coordinates: 17.5308°S 146.0713°E
- Country: Australia
- State: Queensland
- LGA: Cassowary Coast Region
- Location: 6.0 km (3.7 mi) E of Innisfail; 94.1 km (58.5 mi) SSE of Cairns; 263 km (163 mi) NNW of Townsville; 1,621 km (1,007 mi) NNW of Brisbane

Government
  - State electorate: Hill
  - Federal division: Kennedy

Area
  - Total: 9.2 km^{2} (3.6 sq mi)

Population
  - Total: 117 (2021 census)
  - Density: 12.72/km^{2} (32.9/sq mi)
- Time zone: UTC+10:00 (AEST)
- Postcode: 4860
Suburbs around Coquette Point
Innisfail Estate	Coconuts	Coral Sea
Webb	Coquette Point	Coral Sea
South Innisfail	Mourilyan	Etty Bay

Coquette Point is a coastal locality in the Cassowary Coast Region, Queensland, Australia. In the 2021 census, Coquette Point had a population of 117 people.

== Geography ==
Barneys Point is the most north-westerly part of the locality (17.5106°S 146.0608°E) where the Johnstone River turns east towards the Coral Sea.

== Demographics ==
In the 2016 census, Coquette Point had a population of 74 people.

In the 2021 census, Coquette Point had a population of 117 people.

== Education ==
There are no schools in Coquette Point. The nearest government primary school is Innisfail East State School in East Innisfail to the west. The nearest government secondary school is Innisfail State College in Innisfail Estate to the north-west.
