= Ella Bay =

Bay in Queensland, Australia

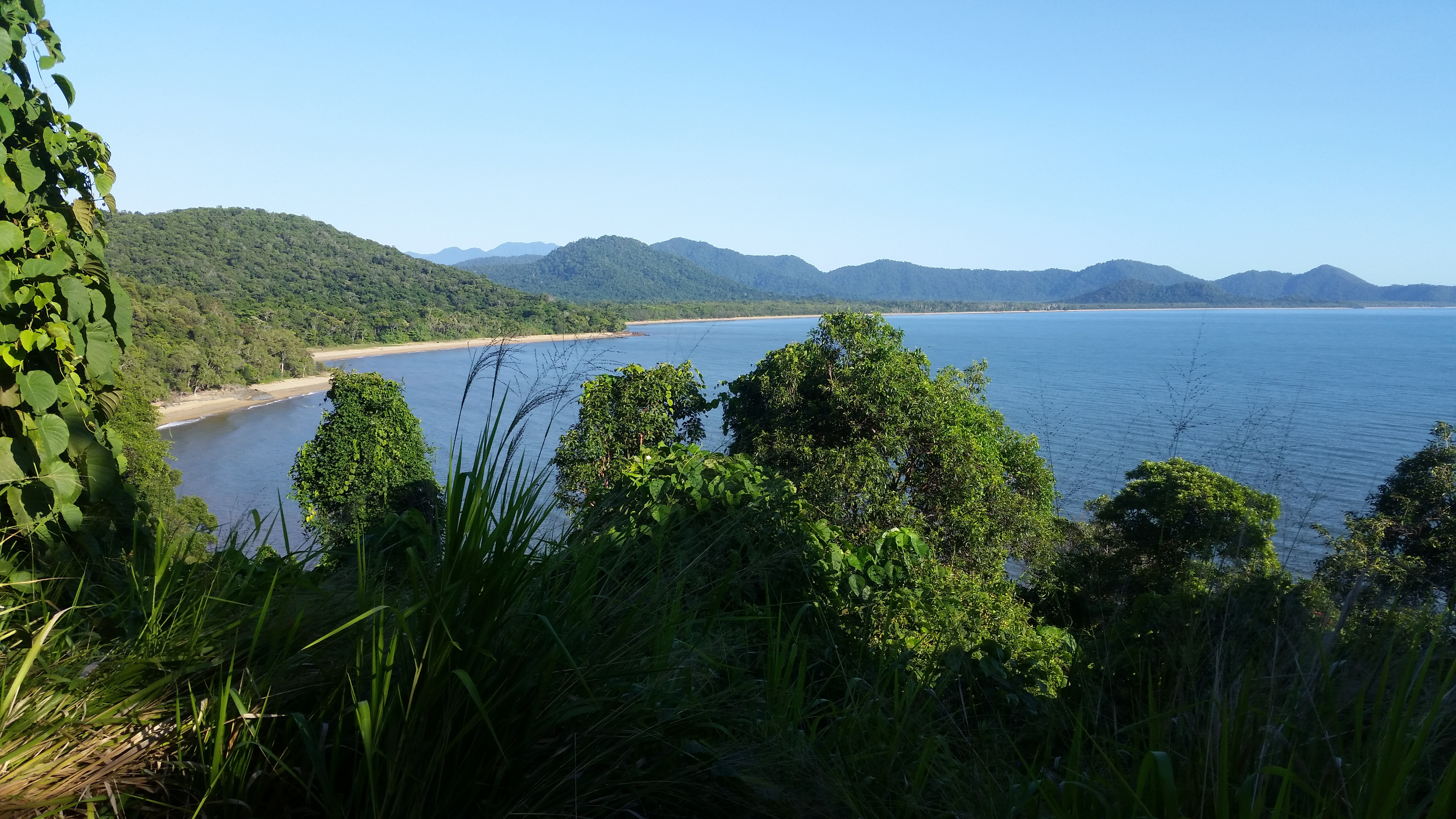
- Southern end of Ella Bay, looking north from Heath's point

- Location within Queensland
- Location: Far North Queensland
- Coordinates: 17°27′05″S 146°04′02″E
- Ocean/sea sources: Coral Sea
- Basin countries: Australia
- Max. length: 9 km (5.6 mi)

Ella Bay is a bay in the Cassowary Coast Region in Far North Queensland, Australia. It is in close proximity to the town of Innisfail. Innisfail is situated 88 kilometres (55 mi) south of Cairns and 260 kilometres (160 mi) north of Townsville. The bay is bounded by Cooper's point in the north and Heath's point in the south. The land area adjacent to Ella Bay is named Wanjuru.

At the landscape scale, the mountain ranges encircling Ella Bay itself lie mostly within the Wet Tropics World Heritage Site, recognised for its natural heritage. Parts of Ella Bay are protected within the Ella Bay National Park. The ocean directly offshore at Ella Bay lies within the Great Barrier Reef Marine Park, which is also the Great Barrier Reef World Heritage Area. There are two blocks of private land at the southern end of Ella Bay, a predominantly cleared 470 ha (1,200 acres) block and a 26 hectares (65 acres) rainforest block named Little Cove by property developer Satori Ella Bay.

The average annual rainfall at Innisfail is over 3,500 millimetres (140 in) or 3.5 metres (11 ft) according to the Bureau of Meteorology, and the average number of rainy days per year is 150 days.

== History ==
The Ella Bay area was originally inhabited by the Bagirbarra clan, the recognised traditional owners of the Ella Bay land and one of the Mamu speaking clan groups of the Innisfail region. The richness and diversity of the Wet Tropics lowland rainforest environment, would have allowed for a population density of approximately 2 km^{2} (0.77 sq mi) per person and a "band" of approximately 50 individuals.

Ella Bay lies within the traditional country of the Mamu peoples, an Aboriginal Australian tribe with a number of distinctive clan groups. These clan groups have cultural and spiritual ties to coastal lowlands, coastal lands and waters within what is now known as the northern part of the Cassowary Coast region of north eastern Queensland, Australia. Before colonisation, Mamu people moved seasonally within their traditional country, accessing and using important food sources including seafoods, freshwater fish, game animals, rainforest fruits and roots. Certain plant species used by rainforest Aboriginal tribes in this area on a regular basis are highly toxic, and careful preparation using time honoured methods were employed to make these food sources safe for eating. During particular seasons, these toxic foods would form a staple of the tribes' diets. In some locations, early European visitors (for example the anthropologist Roth) recorded seeing communal settlements with multiple shelters including long-house type structures, and there is evidence that a taro-type species of yam was cultivated for regular harvest along creeks and rivers. Like so many Aboriginal people in Australia, many Mamu traditional owners were forcibly removed from their traditional lands to other places in Queensland including Cherbourg, Woorabinda, Yarrabah and Palm Island mission settlements. Some have come back to live in the area since the mid-20th century.

First contact with Europeans came with a handful of survivors from the wreck of the brig Maria. On 26 February 1872, after escapes from reef and rocks, the brig ran onto what is still known as the Maria reef, some miles off Cardwell. All the men who got ashore via raft north of the Johnstone River owed their lives to the local Aboriginal people, who treated them kindly, fed and made camps for them, and signalled the rescue boat Basilisk to come ashore.

The first settlers were the "cedar getters" in 1880 during the influx of timber cutters after the local red cedar species (Toona ciliata), quickly followed by becoming a key growing area for bananas and sugar cane. The later industries persist into the present day.

The latest cyclone to hit the Innisfail region was Cyclone Yasi – making landfall as a category 5 on the 3 February 2011. Yasi was one of the most powerful cyclones to have hit Queensland since records commenced. Cyclone Larry (category 4 before striking land) on 20 March 2006. Major damage to homes and other buildings was caused by Larry, as well as extensive damage to local crops (tropical fruits, sugar and bananas) and timber plantations.

== Flora and fauna ==
External videos
- Indo-pacific humpback dolphin
- Endangered southern cassowary

The Ella Bay area is home to a large variety of plant and animal life including iconic species like the endangered southern cassowary (Casuarius casuarius johnsonii), endangered and vulnerable frog species including the Australian lace-lid, common mist frog and waterfall frog, remnant native plants and estuarine crocodiles. Ella Bay is regularly used by green sea turtles as a nesting site. Other threatened marine turtles may nest in this area though this has yet to be confirmed. The waters off Ella Bay are important shallow water habitat for coastal dolphin species including the endemic snub fin dolphin and the Indo-pacific humpback dolphin. Whales have been observed at Ella Bay including migrating humpback whales. Dugong have been observed at Ella Bay though the poor condition of seagrass beds in the area currently make this area less than optimal dugong habitat.

== Ella Bay development ==
The Ella Bay property comprises 470 ha (1,200 acres) of freehold land used as a cattle station that is isolated within the Ella Bay National Park and Wet Tropics of Queensland and a 65 hectares (160 acres) rainforest block named Little Cove. The Ella Bay site was first surveyed in 1882 and large areas of the site were later cleared for banana production and small crop farming. There are numerous newspaper reports from the early 1900s of Ella Bay being one of the major banana growing areas in Queensland. The newspaper articles report that the land was leased to Chinese farmers and there were over 100 men working the site, that 200 hectares (500 acres) had been cleared for bananas and there was a 100 metres (340 ft) long jetty built in 1902 to load steamers with bananas to Brisbane. There was a note of Ella Bay Road (tender for bridge, Cairns Post 1917). In 1906, this settlement of over 100 Chinese farmers was abandoned after a severe tropical cyclone destroyed their homes and crops. After selling any rescued fruit the Chinese farmers totally abandoned Ella Bay and the area was never resettled.

In recent history, most of the Ella Bay site was shown as cleared in Army mapping dated 1943 and the small amount of remaining areas were cleared and levelled in the mid 1960s. Since that time the site has been used mainly for pastoral purposes. Introduced tropical pasture grass (Brachiaria decumbens and Brachiaria humidicola) covers almost all of the cleared area.

The 470 ha (1,200-acre) site is mostly cleared. Introduced weed infestation (including pond apple, Hymenachne, sicklepod) have further degraded much of these pasture areas and the margins of remnant vegetated areas and this situation has been brought about by a failure of successive property owners to control these invasive weed species in a timely and efficient manner. The 65 ha (160-acre) Little Cove property is covered almost entirely with "endangered" and "of concern" rainforest vegetation. Under Commonwealth EPBCA legislation, littoral rainforest is listed as "critically endangered". This land is situated in the southern section of Ella Bay as the northern area was too wet for agriculture. The northern wetland known as Ella Bay Swamp is classified as a wetland of national significance and is primarily located within Ella Bay National Park.

It is proposed to construct the Ella Bay Integrated Resort; an integrated resort and property development focusing on sustainability, and environmental stewardship. The stated ecological goal of the development is to live sustainably with the minimum carbon footprint, rainwater harvesting and recycling of water and minimising pollution, through the general philosophy of ecological living and principles of sustainable development, and to protect and enhance the fauna and flora of the site and surrounds through responsible use and protection of the natural environment, through conservation and sustainable practices.

The project was approved by the Federal Government on 19 December 2012 with 19 conditions designed to reduce environmental impacts. The road to the resort will have to be fenced and have crossing to protect cassowaries. 50 hectares of habitat re-vegetation is to occur onsite.

=== Opposition ===
Local conservationists strongly oppose this urban development/resort complex for many reasons. The influx of up to 5,000 people into this wilderness area is feared to have the potential to cause great harm to this refuge area. Associated traffic into this area will threaten the safety of endangered southern cassowaries and endangered frog species. Critically endangered coastal rainforest will be destroyed to provide access to the property development and to clear sites for 100 residences at the Little Cove development site. Conservationist Russell Constable from the Cassowary Coast Alliance is concerned that coastal dolphin species, which are already threatened, will be adversely impacted by increased boat and jet ski activity from the area's new residents, as will nesting marine turtles. Conservationists also claim it is unwise to place so many people in area that is so susceptible to the impacts of tropical cyclones and has a history of such disasters.
