= Webb, Queensland =

Webb
- Suburb
- Interactive map of Webb
- Coordinates: 17.5316°S 146.0502°E
- Country: Australia
- State: Queensland
- LGA: Cassowary Coast Region
- Location: 2.3 km (1.4 mi) SE of Innisfail; 90.4 km (56.2 mi) SSE of Cairns; 259 km (161 mi) NNW of Townsville; 1,622 km (1,008 mi) NNW of Brisbane

Government
  - State electorate: Hill
  - Federal division: Kennedy

Area
  - Total: 3.1 km^{2} (1.2 sq mi)

Population
  - Total: 393 (2021 census)
  - Density: 126.8/km^{2} (328/sq mi)
- Time zone: UTC+10:00 (AEST)
- Postcode: 4860
Suburbs around Webb
Innisfail	Innisfail Estate	Coquette Point
East Innisfail	Webb	Coquette Point
East Innisfail	South Innisfail	South Innisfail

Webb is a rural locality in the Cassowary Coast Region, Queensland, Australia. In the 2021 census, Webb had a population of 393 people.

== Demographics ==
In the 2016 census, Webb had a population of 383 people.

In the 2021 census, Webb had a population of 393 people.

== Education ==
There are no schools in Webb. The nearest government primary school is Innisfail East State School in neighbouring East Innisfail to the west. The nearest government secondary school is Innisfail State College in Innisfail Estate to the north.
