= TAFE Queensland North =

- Motto: Make Great Happen
- Type: Technical and further education
- Established: 2013
- Location: North Queensland, Queensland, Australia
- Website: tafenorth.edu.au

TAFE Queensland North was formed on 1 July 2013 by the merger of Barrier Reef Institute of TAFE and Tropical North Queensland TAFE. It services North Queensland and Far North Queensland, and is the largest TAFE region in Queensland with close to 20 campus locations in sixteen localities, covering an area of 52'000 kilometres.

In 2017 TAFE Queensland commenced consolidating TAFE Queensland North and its five other regional registered training organisations (RTOs) into a single RTO. TAFE Queensland North now no longer exists as a separate RTO.

== Campus locations ==
- Atherton
- Northern Peninsula Area (Bamaga)
- Bowen
- Burdekin
- Cairns
- Cairns - Great Barrier Reef International Marine College
- Charters Towers
- Cloncurry
- Ingham
- Innisfail
- Mareeba
- Mount Isa
- Normanton
- Palm Island
- Thursday Island
- Townsville (Aitkenvale)
- Townsville (Bohle - Trade Training Centre)
- Townsville (Pimlico)
- Whitsundays

== See also ==
- TAFE Queensland
