= Tropical North Queensland TAFE =

Coordinates: 16°55′18″S 145°45′24″E

Tropical North Queensland TAFE was a TAFE institute which delivered vocational education and training programs across a 268,000 square kilometre area of north-eastern Australia. The Institute offered about 400 courses in 30 vocational training areas in Queensland.

In 2013, the institute merged with Barrier Reef Institute of TAFE to form TAFE Queensland North.
