= East Innisfail, Queensland =

East Innisfail
- Suburb
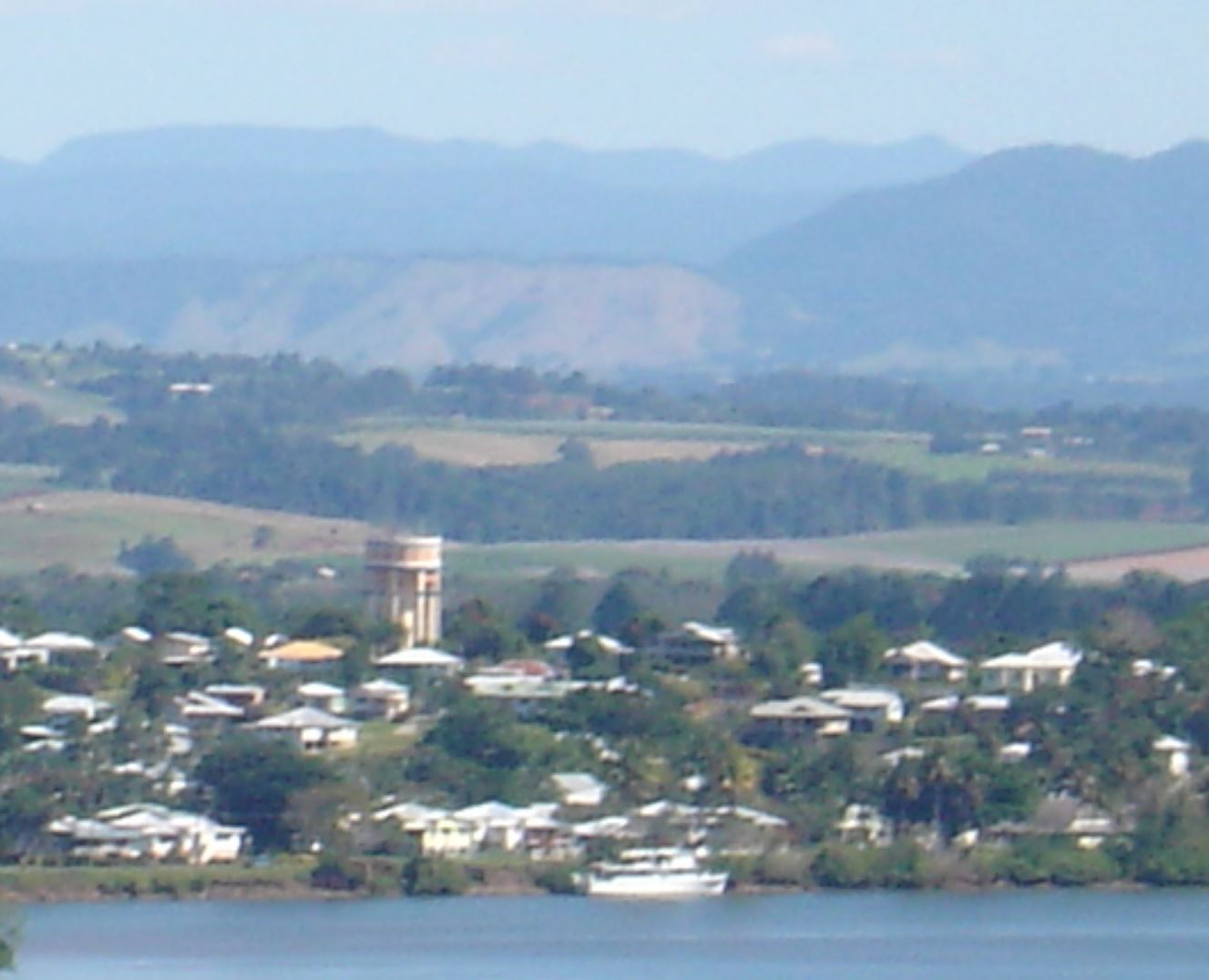
- Innisfail Water Tower, a landmark in East Innisfail, 2005

- Interactive map of East Innisfail
- Coordinates: 17.5336°S 146.0341°E
- Country: Australia
- State: Queensland
- LGA: Cassowary Coast Region
- Location: 1.9 km (1.2 mi) SSE of Innisfail; 90 km (56 mi) SSE of Cairns; 258 km (160 mi) NNW of Townsville; 1,616 km (1,004 mi) NNW of Brisbane

Government
  - State electorate: Hill
  - Federal division: Kennedy

Area
  - Total: 1.4 km^{2} (0.54 sq mi)

Population
  - Total: 1,757 (2021 census)
  - Density: 1,260/km^{2} (3,250/sq mi)
- Time zone: UTC+10:00 (AEST)
- Postcode: 4860
Suburbs around East Innisfail
Innisfail	Innisfail; Innisfail Estate	Innisfail; Innisfail Estate
Mighell	East Innisfail	Webb
Mighell	South Innisfail	South Innisfail

East Innisfail is a suburban locality in the Cassowary Coast Region, Queensland, Australia. In the 2021 census, East Innisfail had a population of 1,757 people.

== Geography ==
The locality is bounded by the Johnstone River to the north, by its tributary the South Johnstone River to the west and by Marty Street to the south.

East Innisfail is directly linked to the Innisfail CBD via the new Jubilee Bridge (17.5251°S 146.0329°E) over the South Johnstone River.

== History ==
Historically the suburb was linked to the CBD by the original Jubilee Bridge, which was built in 1923.

Land for a school was secured by the Department of Lands in 1935. Innisfail East State School opened on 6 March 1936.

In 1930, the local Methodists relocated a church from Chillagoe to Mourilyan Road, East Innisfail.

Radiant Life Christian College opened on 13 February 1982.

Due to deterioration from both age and increased traffic flow, the original Jubilee Bridge was closed on 19 July 2010 after concerns were raised over the safety and integrity of the structure. The new Jubilee Bridge was built, which opened on 2 September 2011.

In early 2011, some residents in low-lying areas of the suburb were evacuated ahead of the passing of Cyclone Yasi. Shortly after there were a number of cases of dengue fever recorded in the suburb.

Darlinga Forest School opened in February 2021. It was an independent primary (Prep–4) school for boys and girls at 89 Mourilyan Road with an emphasis on hands-on outdoor education. In 2023, it had an enrolment of 10 students with 3 teachers (1.8 full-time equivalent) and a part-time school support worker. The school was closed in mid-2023 by the Queensland Government's Non-State Schools Accreditation Board.

== Demographics ==
In the 2006 census, East Innisfail had a population of 1,608 people.

In the 2011 census, East Innisfail had a population of 1,828 people.

In the 2016 census, East Innisfail had a population of 1,855 people.

In the 2021 census, East Innisfail had a population of 1,757 people.

== Heritage listings ==
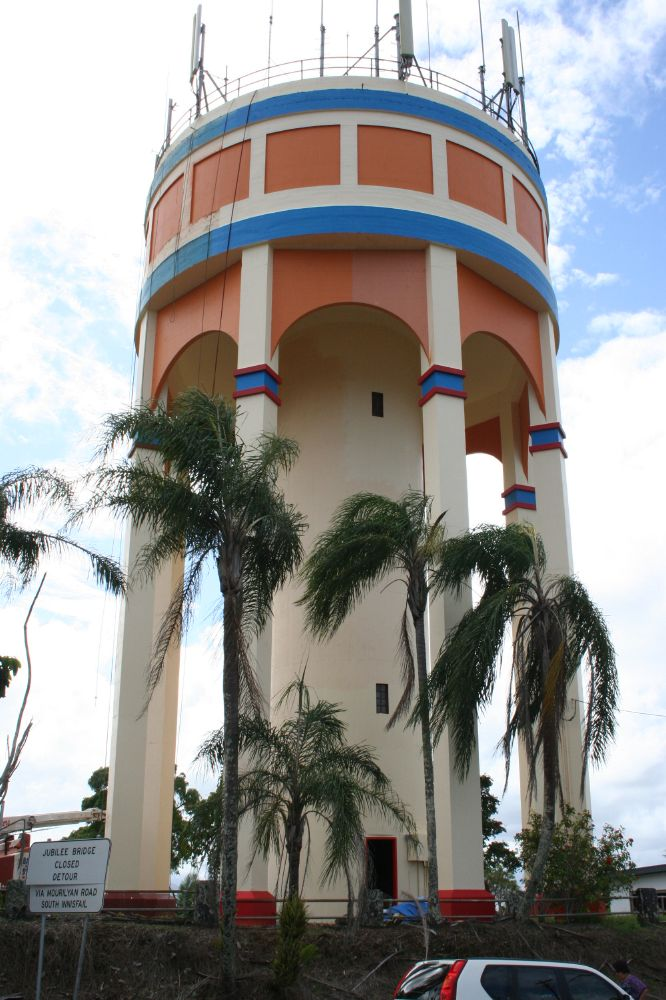
Innisfail Water Tower, 2010

East Innisfail has a number of heritage-listed sites, including:

- Innisfail Water Tower, Mourilyan Street (17.5286°S 146.0343°E)

== Education ==
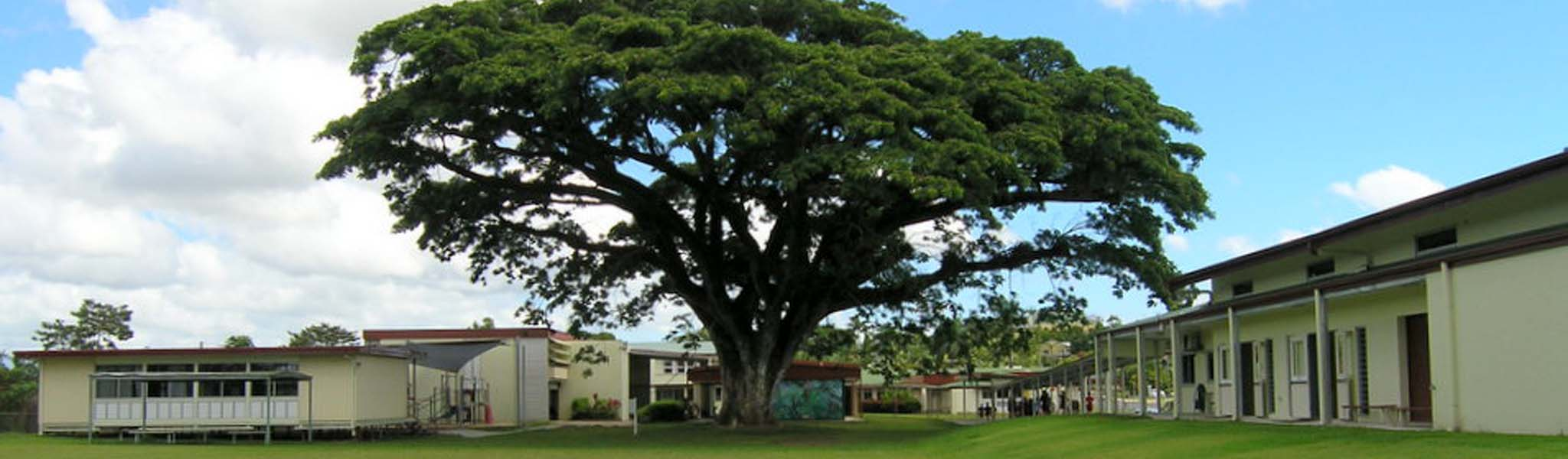
Innisfail East State School, 2025

Innisfail East State School is a government primary (Prep–6) school for boys and girls at 92 Mourilyan Road (17.5347°S 146.0327°E). In 2017, the school had an enrolment of 260 students with 17 teachers (16 full-time equivalent) and 15 non-teaching staff (11 full-time equivalent).

Radiant Life Christian College is a private primary (Prep–7) school for boys and girls at 1–5 Riley Street (17.5395°S 146.0348°E). The school has an emphasis on education of Indigenous children but is open to all children. In 2017, the school had an enrolment of 83 students with 6 teachers (5 full-time equivalent) and 11 non-teaching staff. In 2020, the school had an enrolment of 91 students (of whom 89 were Indigenous) with 6 teachers and 16 non-teaching staff (14 full-time equivalent). There is one Indigenous teacher and 14 Indigenous non-teaching staff.

There is no secondary school in East Inisfail; the nearest is in Innisfail State College in neighbouring Innisfail Estate to the north.

== Amenities ==
The Innisfail Bowls Club is at 1 The Corso (17.5253°S 146.0338°E) at the confluence of the rivers.

The locality has three churches and a park running along the river.
