= Flying Fish Point, Queensland =

Flying Fish Point
- Town
- Interactive map of Flying Fish Point
- Coordinates: 17.4972°S 146.0752°E
- Country: Australia
- State: Queensland
- LGA: Cassowary Coast Region
- Location: 8.1 km (5.0 mi) NE of Innisfail; 95.7 km (59.5 mi) SSE of Cairns; 267 km (166 mi) NNW of Townsville; 1,623 km (1,008 mi) NNW of Brisbane

Government
  - State electorate: Hill
  - Federal division: Kennedy

Area
  - Total: 5.5 km^{2} (2.1 sq mi)

Population
  - Total: 395 (2021 census)
  - Density: 71.8/km^{2} (186.0/sq mi)
- Time zone: UTC+10:00 (AEST)
- Postcode: 4860
Localities around Flying Fish Point
Wanjuru	Wanjuru	Coral Sea
Coconuts	Flying Fish Point	Coral Sea
Coconuts	Coral Sea	Coral Sea

Flying Fish Point is a coastal town, locality and headland in the Cassowary Coast Region, Queensland, Australia. In the 2021 census, the locality of Flying Fish Point had a population of 395 people.

== Geography ==
Flying Fish Point is on the northern shore of the mouth of the Johnstone River as it enters the Coral Sea.

== History ==
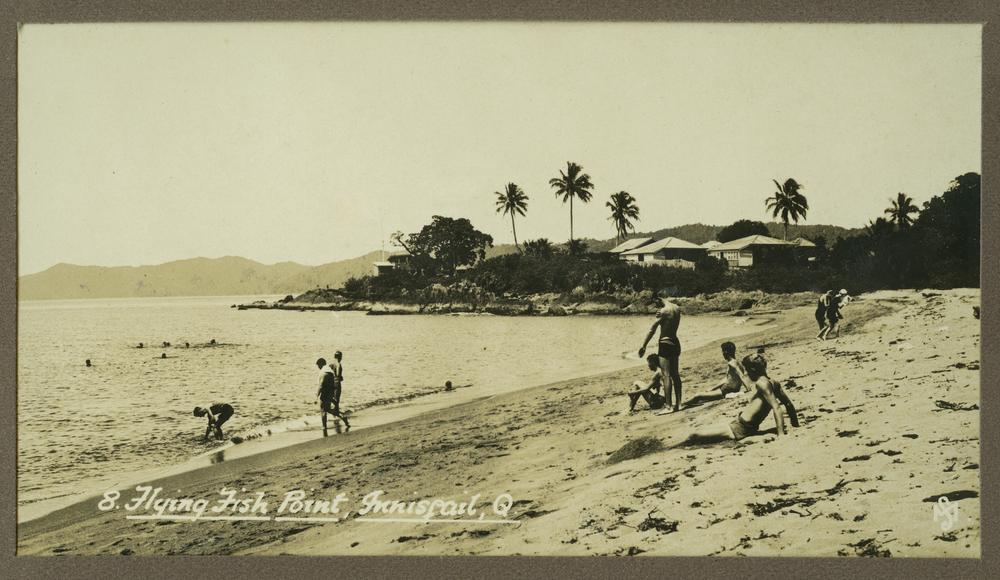
Enjoying the beach at Flying Fish Point, 1930

The town was originally called Musgrave, but on 1 December 1961 it was officially changed to Flying Fish Point. The town's name comes from the headland, which in turn was named by explorer George Elphinstone Dalrymple on 4 October 1873, after the twelve ton cutter Flying Fish which was the principal vessel of his North East Coast Expedition. The southern shore of the mouth of the Johnstone River, Coquette Point, was named after another cutter in the expedition. C

Thomas Henry Fitzgerald had successfully established sugarcane plantations in the Mackay area and in April 1880 came to Flying Fish Point and planted sugarcane there on 15 June 1880. The focus of his sugarcane interests shifted further up the Johnstone River resulting in the establishing of Geraldton (later Innisfail) as the major sugarcane growing area. Flying Fish Point with its sandy beach instead became a popular holiday town for the area.

The first Catholic mass was celebrated in Flying Fish Point on 1 January 1940 in Edwin Shaw's hut.

Flying Fish Point Provisional School opened on 23 January 1899. It closed on a number of occasions due to low student numbers. It also closed for a period in 1918 after the school building was destroyed in a cyclone in March 1918. The school also closed for a period in World War II from about February 1942 when people were evacuated from the district due to fears of a Japanese invasion but the school did not reopen until 1947. It is unclear when it became Flying Fish Point State School as it is today.

== Demographics ==
In the 2016 census, the locality of Flying Fish Point had a population of 425 people.

In the 2021 census, the locality of Flying Fish Point had a population of 395 people.

== Education ==
Flying Fish Point State School is a government co-educational primary (P-6) school on Maud Street (17.4996°S 146.0750°E). In 2016, the school had an enrolment of 56 students with 5 teachers (4 full-time equivalent) and 10 non-teaching staff (5 full-time equivalent).

There are no secondary schools in Flying Fish Point. The nearest government secondary school is Innisfail State College in Innisfail Estate to the south-west.

== Community groups ==
The Flying Fish Point branch of the Queensland Country Women's Association meets at QCWA Hall on Alice Street.

== Amenities ==
The town is home to the Flying Fish Point Tourist Park and a cafe.

== Gallery ==
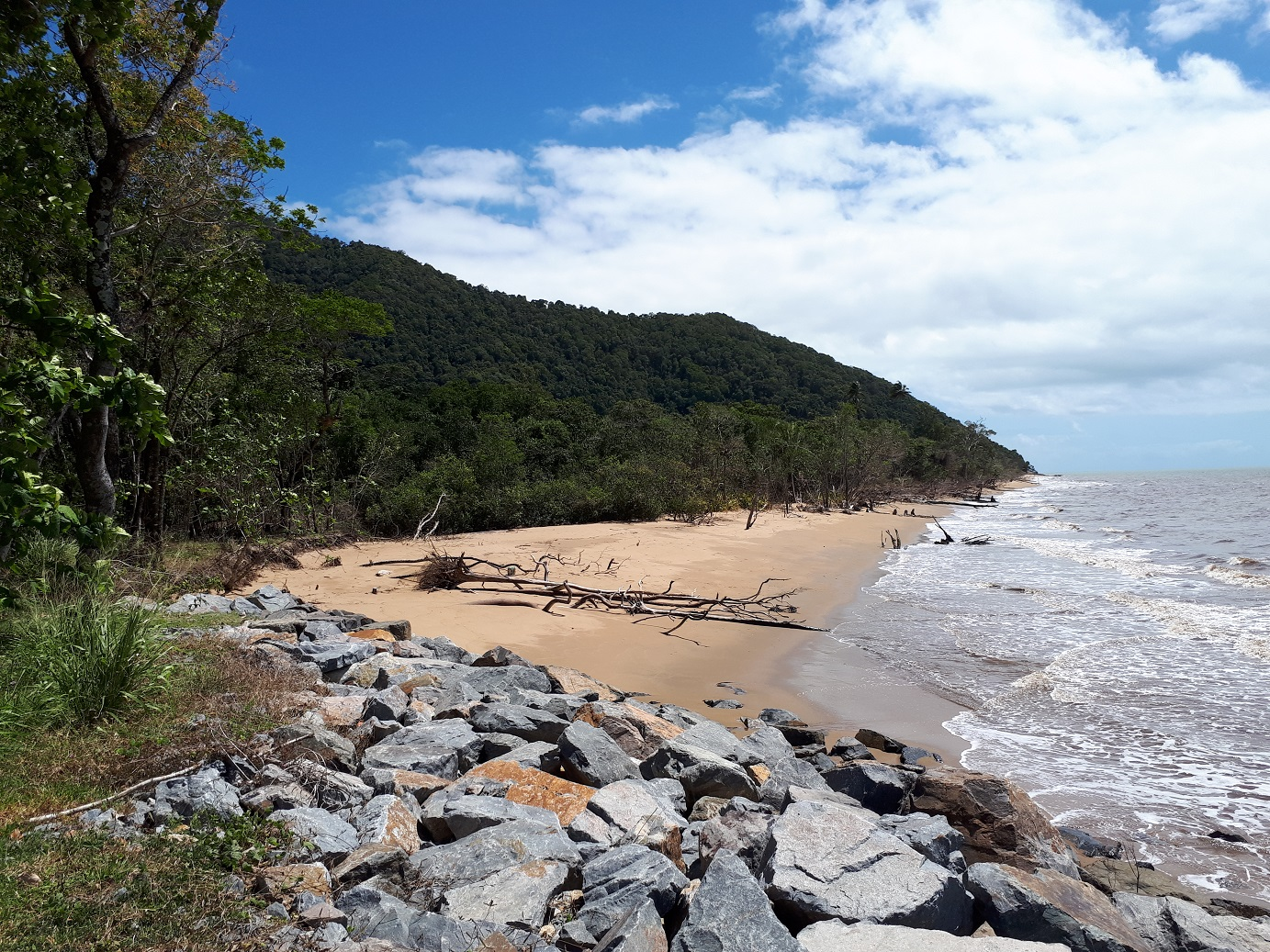
Flying Fish Point Beach

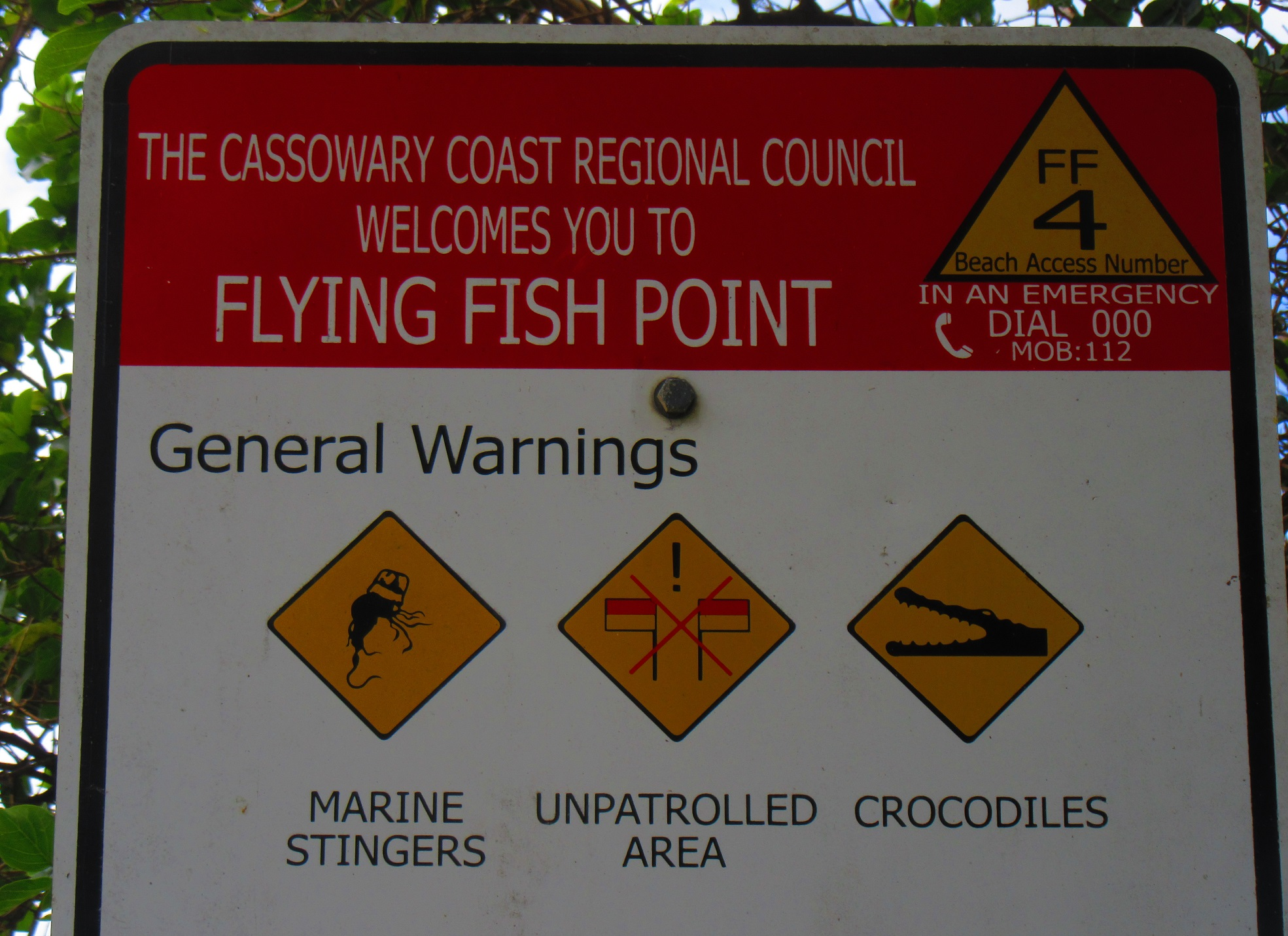
Beach Warning Sign

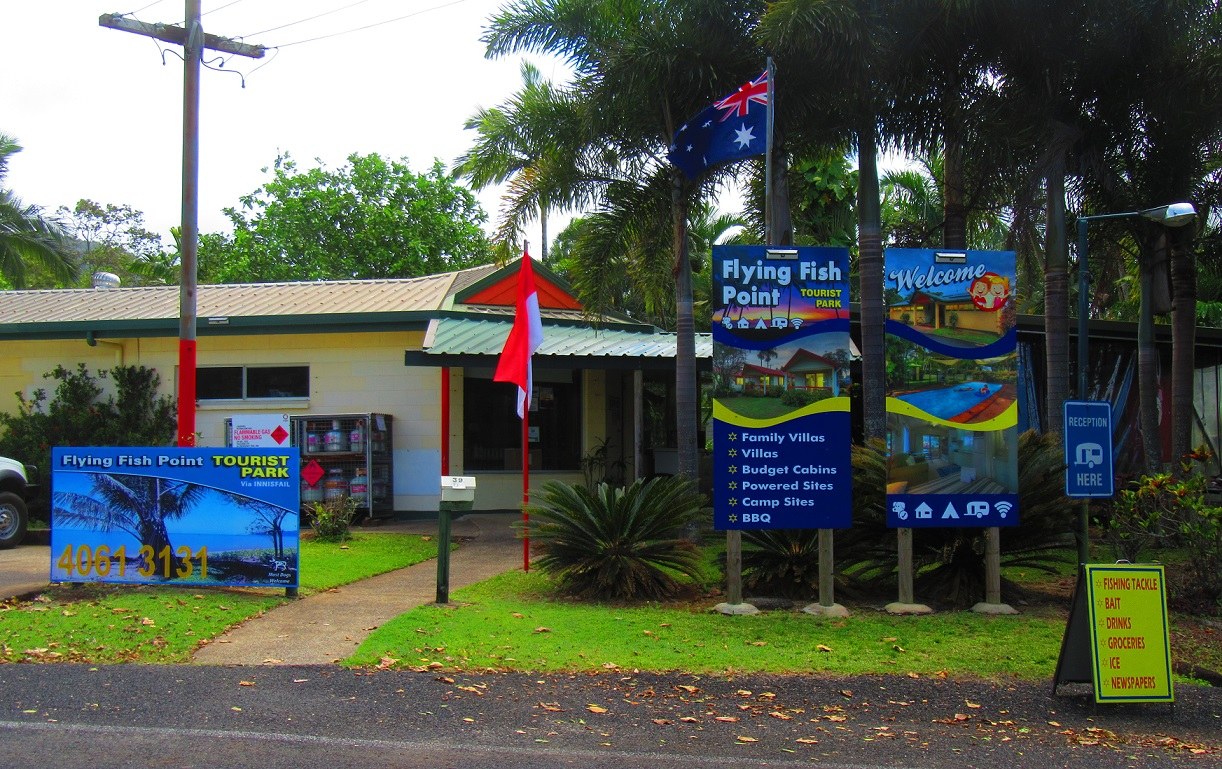
Flying Fish Point Tourist Park

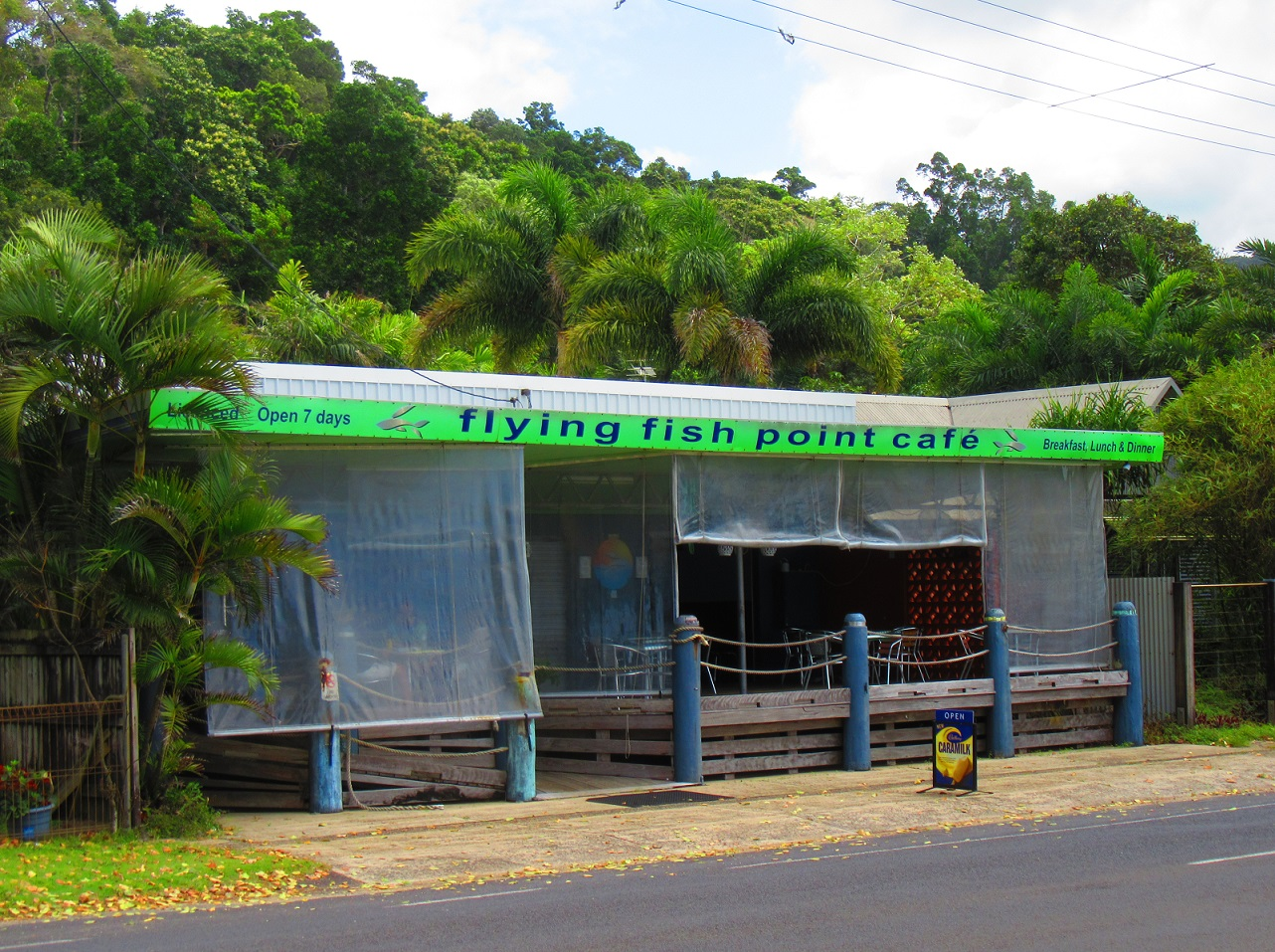
Flying Fish Point Cafe
