= Innisfail State College =

Educational institution in Innisfail, Queensland, Australia

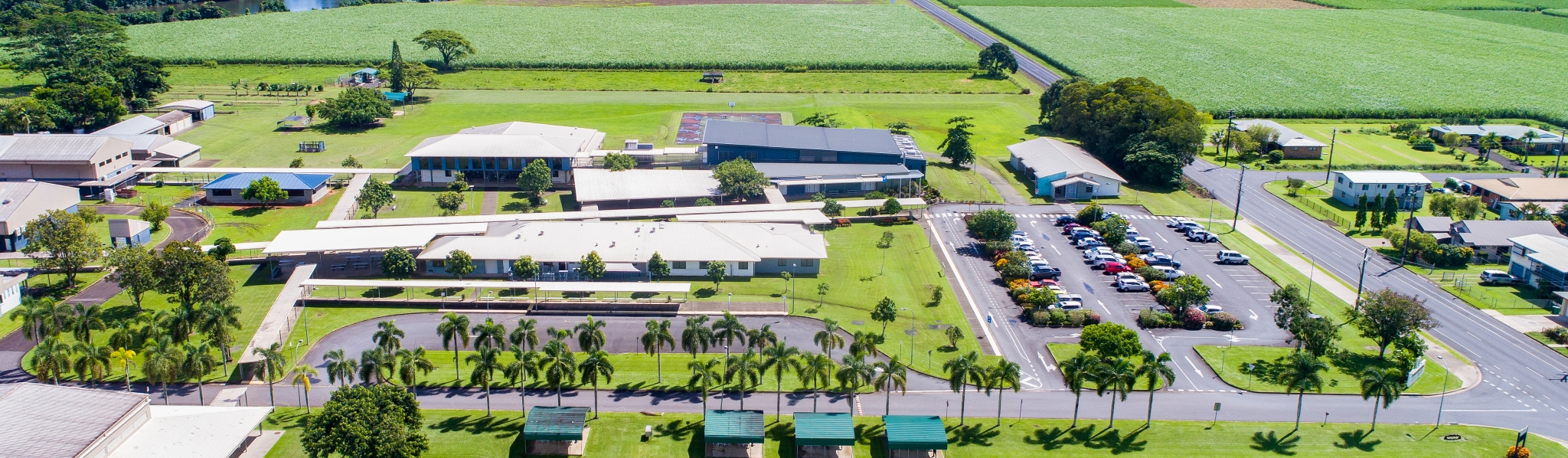
- Aerial photo of Innisfail State College, 2020

Location
- 45 Flying Fish Point Road; Innisfail Estate, Queensland, 4860; Australia; 17°30′56″S 146°02′05″E

Information
- Type: Combined State primary and comprehensive secondary day school, special needs school, and technical college
- Religious affiliation: Non-denominational
- Established: 2010
- Authority: Department of Education (Queensland)
- Principal: Tanya Martin (Innisfail State College)
- Deputy Principals: Sally Hammett (Junior Schooling); Connie Medley (Senior Schooling); Donna Curzon (Inclusion & Wellbeing)
- Business Services Manager: Alana Robertson
- Year levels: Prep Year – Year 12
- Gender: Non Binary
- Area: 26.5 hectares (0.265 km^{2})
- Campus type: Outer Regional
- Houses: Bederra; Fitzroy; Hinchinbrook; Orpheus
- Colours: Green; White; Black
- Website: innisfailsc.eq.edu.au

Innisfail State College is a government combined primary and comprehensive secondary school, special needs school, and technical college facility in the suburb of Innisfail Estate (Queensland, Australia), in the Cassowary Coast Region of that state. The college is in "Division 5" of the Cassowary Coast Regional Council local government area.

== Etymology ==
The college's name is derived from the suburb of Innisfail Estate. That suburb and the adjacent suburbs of Innisfail and East Innisfail, in turn derived their names from their historical connection with the town of Innisfail. The name of the town came from the name of the sugarcane plantation owned by Thomas Henry Fitzgerald, a sugarcane farmer who settled on local river frontage land, who established the first European settlement in the region in 1880, which became a sugar-producing region. Innisfail is an old poetic name for Ireland, meaning “Isle of Destiny”, and is based on the old Irish word for "Island of Fál" (Irish: Inis Fáil), a reference to the standing stone (Irish: Lia Fáil), known as the "Stone of Destiny", in the "Inauguration Mound" (Irish: an Forrad). The town of Innisfail was initially named Geraldton after the first settler, but in 1910, the government renamed it Innisfail, due to confusion with Geraldton in Western Australia.

== History ==
The college was officially opened on 28 February 2010 by the then Queensland Premier Anna Bligh and then Queensland Education and Training Minister Geoff Wilson.

For reasons of a more effective and efficient delivery of education services, in 2010, the Innisfail State College was formed from a 31 December 2009 amalgamation of the:

- Innisfail State High School (opened: 24 January 1955).
- Innisfail's state special school, then called the Inclusive Education Centre, but now called the Diverse Learning Centre (opened: 1 January 1980).
- Tropical North Queensland Institute of Technical and Further Education (TNQIT) (Innisfail Campus) (1 January 1998).

== Infrastructure ==
=== Establishment ===
Innisfail State High School suffered severe damage when the town was devastated by Cyclone Larry in 2006, requiring the school to function using several demountable classrooms while it underwent substantial repair and rebuilding. Community consultation commenced in August 2007, and there was overwhelming community support for the relocation of the school to the site of the local TAFE (Technical and Further Education) for the start of the 2010 year, a site which, as of 2025, the college still occupies. The college used existing TAFE buildings, complemented with some newly constructed buildings, including a new administration building, horticulture building and maintenance workshop. Since 2015, Innisfail State College has split P Block classrooms for TAFE students.

On 25 May 2008, the then Queensland Department of Education, Training and the Arts Minister, Rod Welford, announced that the state government had approved $36.7 million, used for the redevelopment of the expanded Innisfail TAFE site into a new integrated community education facility under stage one of the Queensland Government's $850 million "State Schools of Tomorrow" program. At that time, it was the most significant one-off state government investment in Queensland's education in its history. With the addition of the $1.2 million Federal Government’s Building the Education Revolution grant and the college’s $200,000 contribution, the redevelopment cost $38 million. The redevelopment of the old TAFE site, into its amalgamated Innisfail State College form, saw the campus grow from 1.15 hectares (0.012 km^{2}) to 26.5 hectares (0.265 km^{2}).

=== Cyclone Shelter ===
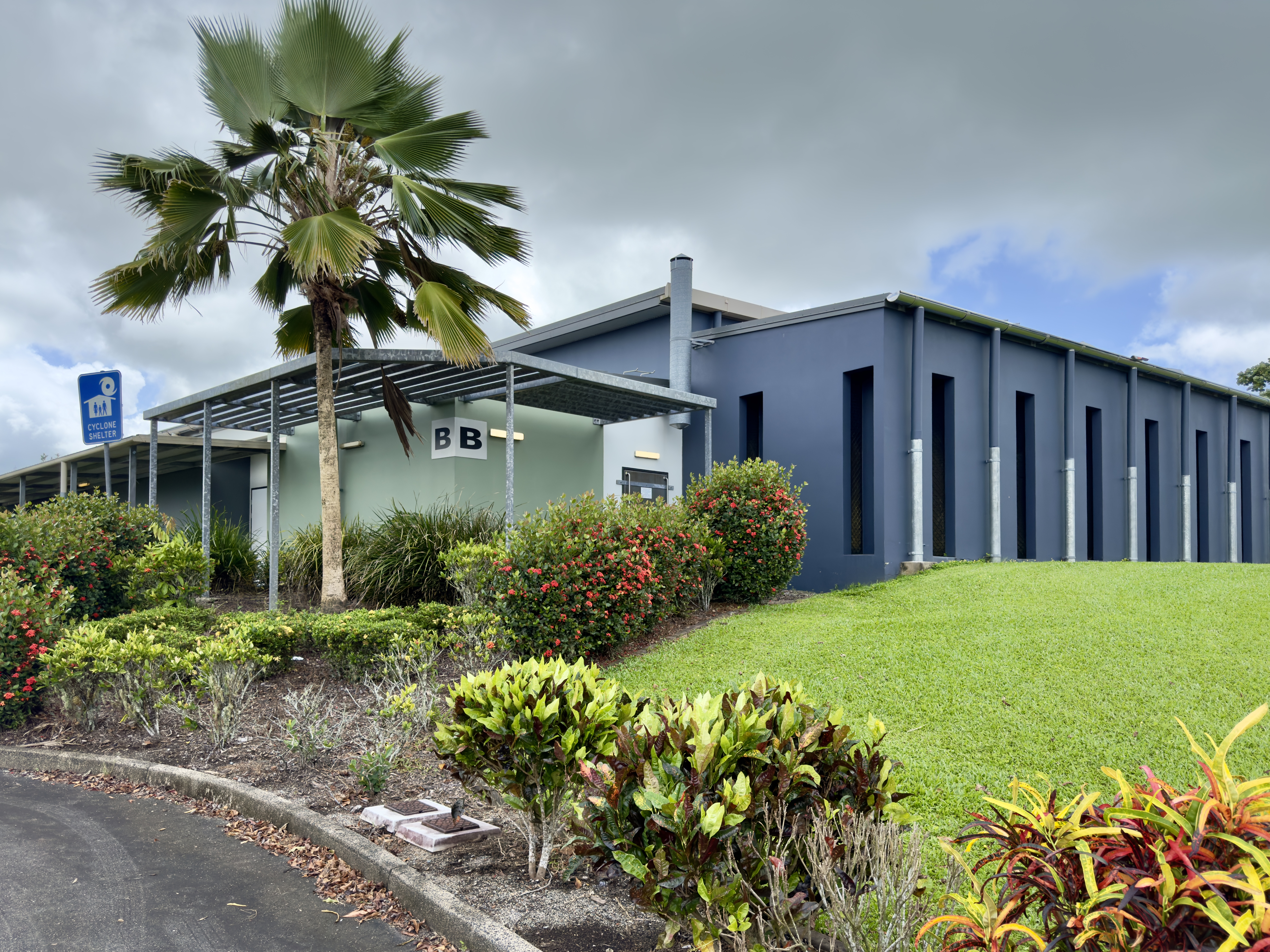
Cyclone Shelter at Innisfail State College, Queensland, 2025

As part of the 2010 upgrade of the college's infrastructure, a cyclone centre was constructed by Allan Sultana Constructions, with Evans Harch Pty Ltd as project manager. The college's shelter, along with the one constructed at Tully State School in 2013, was designed to be used as the 'last option' for people seeking shelter from severe weather events.

=== Diverse Learning Centre ===
The Diverse Learning Centre was constructed in 2010. The centre houses the "Early Childhood Development" program (ECDP), a special needs program that includes all the years from Prep Year – Year 12.

=== Outdoor Basketball Court ===
Funding was approved for a multi-stage development project for an outdoor basketball court. The impetus for the development was on getting youth to become more active by developing lunchtime competitions.

== Administration ==
=== Staff ===
In 2009, the final year of the operation of Innisfail State High School, the school had a teaching staff of 56 (Full-time equivalent: 56) and a non-teaching staff of 35 (Full-time equivalent of 35). On the establishment of Innisfail State College, the college was described as having more than 100 staff. As of 2024, the college has 99 teaching staff (Full-time equivalent: 93.4) and 66 non-teaching staff (Full-time equivalent of 50.2).

=== Principals ===
In 2010, the principal of the college was initially Julie Pozzoli. As of 2025, the principal is Tanya Martin. Principals have included:

Principals
Principal	Tenure	
Principal	Initial Year	Final Year
Innisfail State College
Tanya Martin	2022	Current
Catherine MacDonald	2012	2022
Julie Pozzoli	2010	2012
Innisfail State High School
Julie Pozzoli	2006	2009

Julie Pozzoli was Innisfail State High School's first and only female Principal. She was also that school's last principal, arriving eight weeks before it was damaged by Cyclone Larry in 2006 and continuing on through the school's 2009 closure to become the founding principal of Innisfail State College.

== Canecutter Cluster of Schools ==
The college is part of a 10-school partnership known as the "Canecutter Cluster of Schools", including:

- Goondi State School
- Innisfail State School
- East Innisfail State School
- Flying Fish Point State School
- Mourilyan State School
- Mundoo State School
- Silkwood State School
- South Johnstone State School
- Mena Creek State School
- Daradgee Environmental Education Centre.

== Students ==
=== Years ===
The college originally catered for only Year 8 to Year 12, but additionally began catering for Year 7 in 2015 as part of the official implementation in 2015 of Anna Bligh's state-wide "Flying Start" program, a program which aligned Queensland secondary schools with the other states, which catered for students from Year 7 to Year 12. As of 2025, the special education school caters for Prep Year to Year 6 and, in coordination with the college, Year 7 to Year 12.

=== Enrolments ===
In 2009, in its final year of operation before the merger into Innisfail State College, Innisfail State High School had recorded over 740 secondary student enrolments. On establishment, the college had a secondary student enrolment of 762 students and was described as having over 1,000 secondary, vocational, special and adult education students. As of 2024, the college has 961 students enrolled. The trend in college enrolments (August figures) has been:

Trend in college enrolment figures
Year	Years (Prep – 12)													Boys	Girls	Total	Ref
Year	Prep	1	2	3	4	5	6	7	8	9	10	11	12	Boys	Girls	Total	Ref
Innisfail State High School
2005	-	-	-	-	-	-	-	-	-	-	-	-	-	-	-	752	
2006	-	-	-	-	-	-	-	-	-	-	-	-	-	-	-	760	
2007	-	-	-	-	-	-	-	-	-	-	-	-	-	-	-	731	
2009	-	-	-	-	-	-	-	-	-	-	-	-	-	-	-	722	
Innisfail State College
2010	-	-	-	-	-	-	-	-	-	-	-	-	-	392	370	762	
2011	-	-	-	-	-	-	-	-	-	-	-	-	-	364	333	697	
2012	-	-	-	-	-	-	-	-	-	-	-	-	-	334	325	659	
2013	-	-	-	-	-	-	-	-	-	-	-	-	-	349	344	693	
2014	-	-	-	-	-	-	-	-	-	-	-	-	-	353	358	711	
2015	-	-	-	-	-	-	-	-	-	-	-	-	-	442	410	852	
2016	-	-	-	-	-	-	-	-	-	-	-	-	-	448	417	865	
2017	-	-	-	-	-	-	-	-	-	-	-	-	-	438	414	852	
2018	2	0	1	2	3	19	176	182	154	156	89	473	419	473	419	892	
2019	3	1	3	0	2	2	16	182	176	176	141	146	79	505	421	926	
2020	6	2	1	3	0	1	17	176	182	186	157	126	136	523	470	993	
2021	6	7	2	2	3	0	15	167	167	159	155	125	109	500	417	917	
2022	4	5	7	2	2	5	0	185	167	179	170	148	119	529	464	993	
2023	4	4	5	7	2	1	6	162	203	174	181	151	135	534	501	1,035	
2024	1	4	4	6	7	3	1	149	167	191	167	131	130	510	451	961	
2025	1	1	4	3	8	8	1	167	149	160	184	146	119	500	451	951	
2026	TBA	TBA	TBA	TBA	TBA	TBA	TBA	TBA	TBA	TBA	TBA	TBA	TBA	TBA	TBA	TBA	

Of those students, those in the primary years, and some secondary students, belong to the Early Childhood Development program:

Diverse Learning Centre Enrolment Figures Composition
Year	Years (Prep – 12)													Total	Ref
Year	Prep	1	2	3	4	5	6	7	8	9	10	11	12	Total	Ref
2025	1	1	4	3	8	8	1	1	7	0	1	3	4	42	
2026	TBA	TBA	TBA	TBA	TBA	TBA	TBA	TBA	TBA	TBA	TBA	TBA	TBA	TBA	

== Cultural Diversity ==
=== Indigenous ===
The Traditional Owners of the Innisfail region are the Mamu people, whose native title rights were recognised in 2013 through the Mamu Aboriginal Corporation RNTBC. Of the distinctly defined five clan areas of the Mamu cultural group, i.e. Bagirbarra, Dugulbarra, Dyirribarra, Mandubarra, Warribarra, the college is located within the Mandubarra clan region, which includes the South Johnstone River and adjoining coastal/sea country from Liverpool Creek to Maria Creek, such as the areas immediately south of Innisfail and toward Mourilyan Harbour.

In 2020, the college had 338 Indigenous students, giving it one of the highest percentages of Indigenous secondary students in the Cairns region. The college is a member of the "Indigenous Leaders of the Future" (ILF) and "Indigenous Leaders of Tomorrow" (ILT) programs, two Far North Queensland Indigenous programs.

=== Multiculturalism ===
The trends in multicultural composition have been:

Student enrolment trends
Year	Indigenous	LBOTE	Ref
2014	30	13	
2015	32	12	
2016	32	12	
2017	33	12	
2018	32	13	
2019	33	13	
2020	33	14	
2021	32	15	
2022	34	17	
2023	34	16	
2024	34	16	
2025	TBA	TBA	

== Sports ==
=== Houses ===
The college's four sports houses are named after local islands off the coast of North Queensland:

Sports Houses
House Name	Island	Colour	Ref
Bederra	Bedarra Island	Blue	
Fitzroy	Fitzroy Island	Orange	
Hinchinbrook	Hinchinbrook Island	Green	
Orpheus	Orpheus Island	Purple	

== See also ==
- List of schools in Far North Queensland
- Education in Queensland
- History of state education in Queensland
- List of schools in Queensland
- Lists of schools in Australia
