= East Russell, Queensland =

East Russell
- Suburb
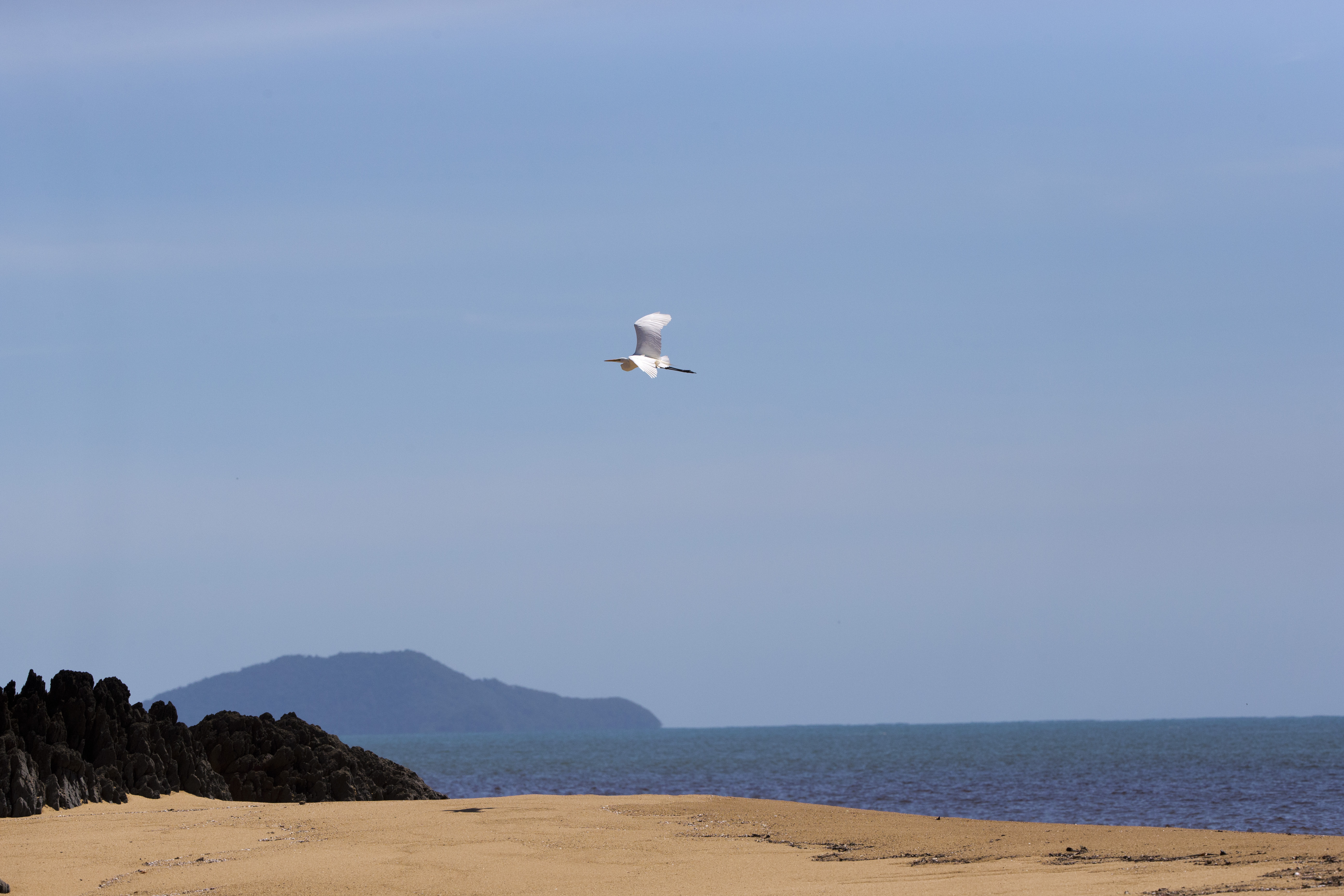
- Beach at East Russell, 2013

- Interactive map of East Russell
- Coordinates: 17.2808°S 145.9763°E
- Country: Australia
- State: Queensland
- City: Cairns
- LGA: Cairns Region
- Location: 8.7 km (5.4 mi) NE of Babinda; 37.3 km (23.2 mi) N of Innisfail; 64.9 km (40.3 mi) SSE of Cairns; 1,650 km (1,030 mi) NNW of Brisbane

Government
  - State electorate: Hill
  - Federal division: Kennedy

Area
  - Total: 244.7 km^{2} (94.5 sq mi)

Population
  - Total: 83 (2021 census)
  - Density: 0.3392/km^{2} (0.879/sq mi)
- Time zone: UTC+10:00 (AEST)
- Postcode: 4861
Suburbs around East Russell
Bellenden Ker	Deeral	Coral Sea
Babinda	East Russell	Coral Sea
Mirriwinni	Eubenangee	Bramston Beach

East Russell is a coastal rural locality in the Cairns Region, Queensland, Australia. The town of Woolanmarroo South is in the north-east of the locality. In the 2021 census, East Russell had a population of 83 people.

== Geography ==
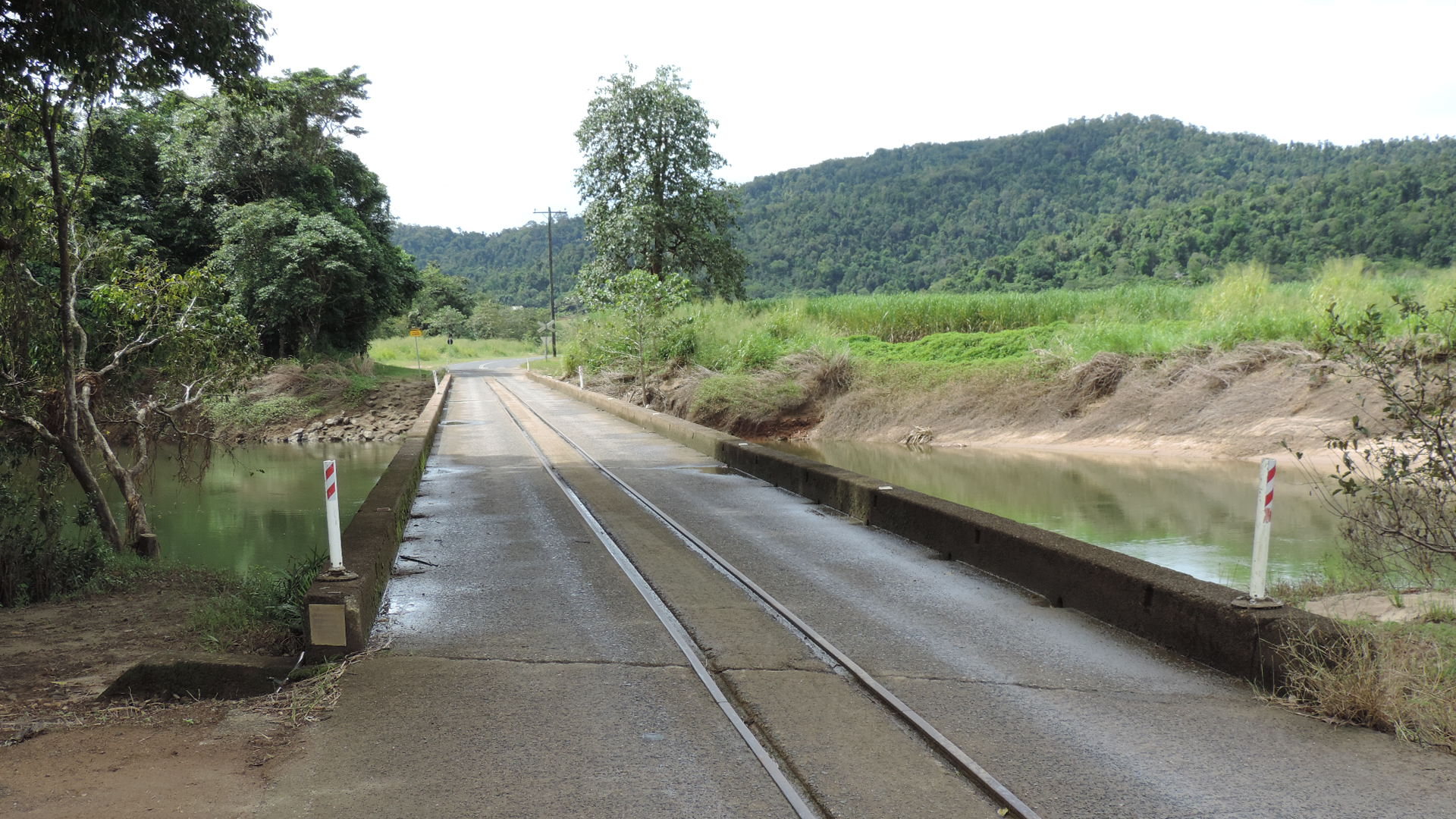
Crossing the single-lane road/rail bridge over the Russell River into East Russell, 2018

East Russell is located on the coast, east of Babinda, slightly north of Innisfail and south of Cairns. It contains the town of Woolanmarroo South (17.2308°S 145.97°E).

The Russell River forms the western border of East Russell. In the north Russell River meets the Mulgrave River at Mutchero Inlet and flow into the Coral Sea. The inlet is the northern extent of the locality.

Much of the locality and almost all of the coastal area is protected within the Russell River National Park.

East Russell has the following coastal features (from north to south):

- Point Constantine (17.2275°S 145.9706°E), where the Mutchero Inlet meets the Coral Sea
- Bramston Point (17.2478°S 145.9794°E)

The Graham Range runs north–south down the middle of the north of the locality (where the coastline forms the eastern boundary of the locality) and then becomes the eastern boundary of the locality in the south of the locality,

East Russell has the following mountains:

- Mount Josey in the north of the locality (17.2565°S 145.9537°E), rising to 153 metres (502 ft) above sea level
- Mount Graham in the south of the locality (17.3709°S 145.9843°E), 191 metres (627 ft)

The locality boundaries extend into the Coarl Sea to include High Island, Normanby Island, Mabel Island, Round Island, and Russell Island. The first four of these islands and several offshore reefs belong to the Frankland Group National Park.

Apart from the protected areas, the land use is a mixture of grazing on native vegetation and crop growing (predominantly sugarcane). There is housing in the town of Woolanmarroo South.

== History ==
Land in the town of Woolanmarroo South was sold in June 1937. The town's name refers to its position relative the town of Woolanmarroo which was on the northern side of the Mutchero Inlet within the present-day locality of Deeral. Although land had been offered for sale in Woolanmarro since at least 1885, that land was never developed and remained in its natural state. It is now part of the Malbon Thompson Range National Park.

== Demographics ==
In the 2016 census, East Russell had a population of 71 people.

In the 2021 census, East Russell had a population of 83 people.

== Education ==
There are no schools in East Russell. The nearest government primary schools are Babinda State School in neighbouring Babinda to the west and Mirriwinni State School in neighbouring Mirriwinni to the south-west. The nearest government secondary school is Babinda State School (to Year 12).
