= Cane Beetles March =

1916 Australian military recruitment event

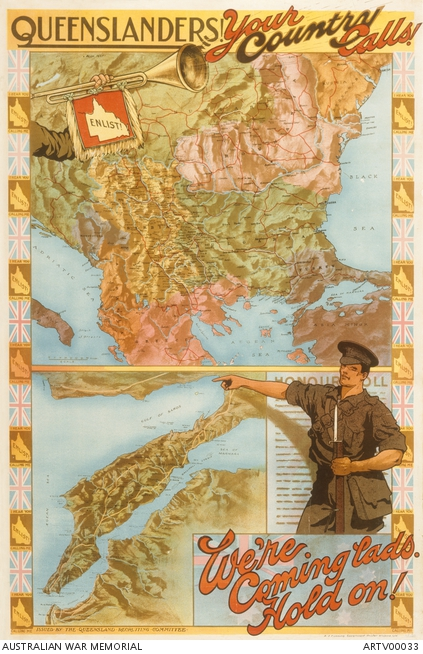
Military recruitment poster, circa 1915

The Cane Beetles March was a snowball march in April 1916 in North Queensland, Australia, to recruit men into the Australian Imperial Force during World War I at a time when enthusiasm to enlist had waned after the loss of life in the Gallipoli campaign. The march began at Mooliba on 20 April 1916 with 4 men and ended in Cairns 60 kilometers later with 29 recruits.

== Background ==
Following Britain's declaration of war on Germany on 4 August 1914, Australia and the other members of the British Empire were also at war. The first Australian to perish on the Western Front was Lieutenant William Malcolm Chisholm of the Lancashire Regiment, who died in the Battle of Le Cateau in France on 26 August 1914. Closer to home, Australian troops secured German New Guinea and the Bismarck Archipelago in September–October 1914. Australians landed on the Gallipoli Peninsula in Turkey on 25 April 1915. By October 1915, Australia had lost 7,279 men in the Gallipoli Campaign and thousands more were wounded. Although Australian troops were withdrawn from Gallipoli by 20 December 1915, more recruits were needed in the Middle East and on the Western Front.

== The march ==
The Cane Beetles March appears to have been the initiative of the Cairns Recruiting Committee. At that time, cane beetles were a major pest in the sugar industry in North Queensland and a banner was made showing the German Kaiser running away from a swarm of beetles, which appears to be the origin of the name of the march. However, the Gordonvale Recruiting Committee disliked the name due to their being a pest, but decided they were prepared to overlook the name in order to focus on "the brave fellows who have responded to the call of duty and are going forth to fight the battles of the Empire and to uphold liberty, freedom and justice".

The route for the march was from Mooliba via Babinda, Aloomba, Gordonvale, and Edmonton to Cairns.

At Mooliba on Thursday 20 April, there were four volunteers to commence the march under the leadership of Sergeant Bloom. There was an enthusiastic send-off with many speeches made. The party reached Babinda at 5.25 p.m. and were greeted there by the townspeople and school children. After speeches of welcome, the party were entertained at Mrs Whittaker's boarding house, followed by a social gathering at the Babinda Hall. Nine more volunteers joined The Beetles at Babinda.

On Friday 21 April (Good Friday), the volunteers left Babinda and marched for four miles through heavy rain (Babinda is known as one of the wettest places in Australia). At Bellenden Ker, the Beetles were served with milk and cake by Mr and Mr Healy, followed by lavish refreshments at Mr J. Hill's place. Lunch was served in a large pavilion at Ross's farm including 75 pounds of fresh fish from the Russell River followed by the usual toasts. On arrival at McDonald's Creek, the Kerrs provided refreshment and the volunteers saluted a Union Jack that had been through the Boer War. Arriving at Fishery Creek, local residents welcomed them with entertainment at Mr Thompson's place with Mr Booker making a fine speech, followed by cheers for the King and Empire. There was another large reception at Mount Sophia where the Beetles were entertained at Mrs O'Byrne's place with speeches and patriotic songs. At arrival at Aloomba at 5.20pm, the volunteers were escorted by the townspeople to a public reception. That night the Beetles were the guests of Mrs O'Reagan at her Aloomba Hotel. Four volunteers joined at Aloomba.

The Beetles left Aloomba at noon on Saturday 22 April and reached Gordonvale Bridge in the mid-afternoon where they were met by the townspeople including the rifle club, cadets, school children and Gordonvale band. The volunteers had a swim in the Mulgrave River. Then an arge procession was formed to march to Gordonvale Park, where members of the Gordonvale Recruiting Committee delivered speeches. A Red Cross social was held in the evening and the volunteers were presented with cigarettes and tobacco. Later that evening the Beetles were entertained at the Nelson Hotel and at the movies.

On Sunday 23 April (Easter Sunday), the Beetles spent the day in Gordonvale. In the morning the volunteers conducted a drill and in the afternoon paid visits by motorcar to the farms of the Messrs Cannon, Bastin and Alley, where they were royally entertained at each place. Then there was a parade to the Presbyterian Church. Six volunteers joined at Gordonvale.

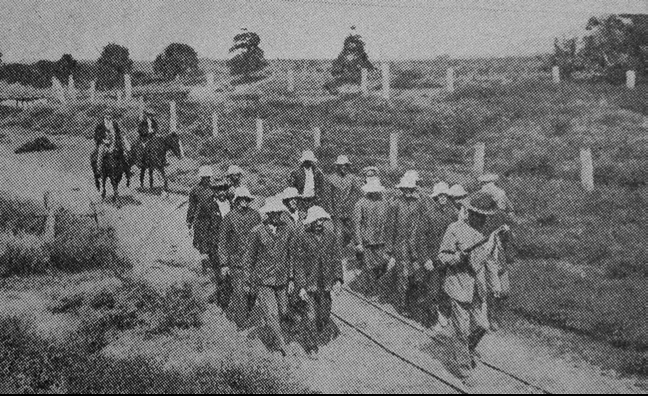
March of the Cane Beetles leaving Gordonvale, April 1916

On Monday 24 April, the Beetles marched out of Gordonvale, accompanied by the Gordonvale band to the outskirts of the town, where they were farewelled with more speeches. They left with a gift of a case of beer from Mr Lancaster of the Queen's Hotel. Arriving at McKinnon's Bridge at 12.20pm, the volunteers were escorted into Edmonton with musical accompaniment. A public reception was held at the Edmonton Hall followed by a splendid repast, completed with toasts and a stirring speech by Mr C Butler. In the afternoon, there was a rugby match between the Beetles and the Edmonton team, ending in a nil-all draw. In the evening the Beetles were entertained at both of Edmonton's hotels. Two recruits joined from Green Hill and three recruits joined from Edmonton.

On Tuesday 25 April (Anzac Day) the Beetles were presented with tobacco and cigarettes before departing Edmonton at 9.35am. The volunteers were met on arrival at Woree by Mr G R Mayers, the chairman of the Cairns Shire Council, where one final recruit joined the marchers. The Beetles arrived in Cairns by 2pm with a total of 29 recruits. The volunteers then marched in the Anzac Day parade in Cairns.

== Aftermath ==
Only 9 of the recruits were declared fit for military duty.

== Re-enactment ==
In 2016 as part of the First World War Centenary, Innisfail Canegrowers organised an re-enactment of the 63-kilometre (39 mi) march.
