= High Island =

High Island may refer to:

- High Island (Alaska), USA
- High Island, Texas, USA, a community
- High Island (Michigan), USA
  - High Island, Michigan, former community
- High Island (New York), USA
- High Island (Hong Kong) (Leung Shuen Wan, 糧船灣洲), Sai Kung District, New Territories
- High Island (Queensland), Australia
- High Island (Maryland), an island in Maryland, USA
- High Island (Rhode River), an island in Maryland, USA
- High Island in Torres Strait, Queensland, Australia
- High Island, one of the Thimble Islands in Connecticut, USA
- Ardoileán or High Island, Ireland
- East Wallabi Island, usually referred to as "High Island" in the context of the Batavia shipwreck

== See also ==
- high island, a geological term describing an island of volcanic origin
