= Bramston Beach =

Bramston Beach may refer to:

- Bramston Beach (politician) (1826–1901), long-serving British Member of Parliament
- Bramston Beach, Queensland, town in Australia
