= Aloomba, Queensland =

Aloomba
- Town
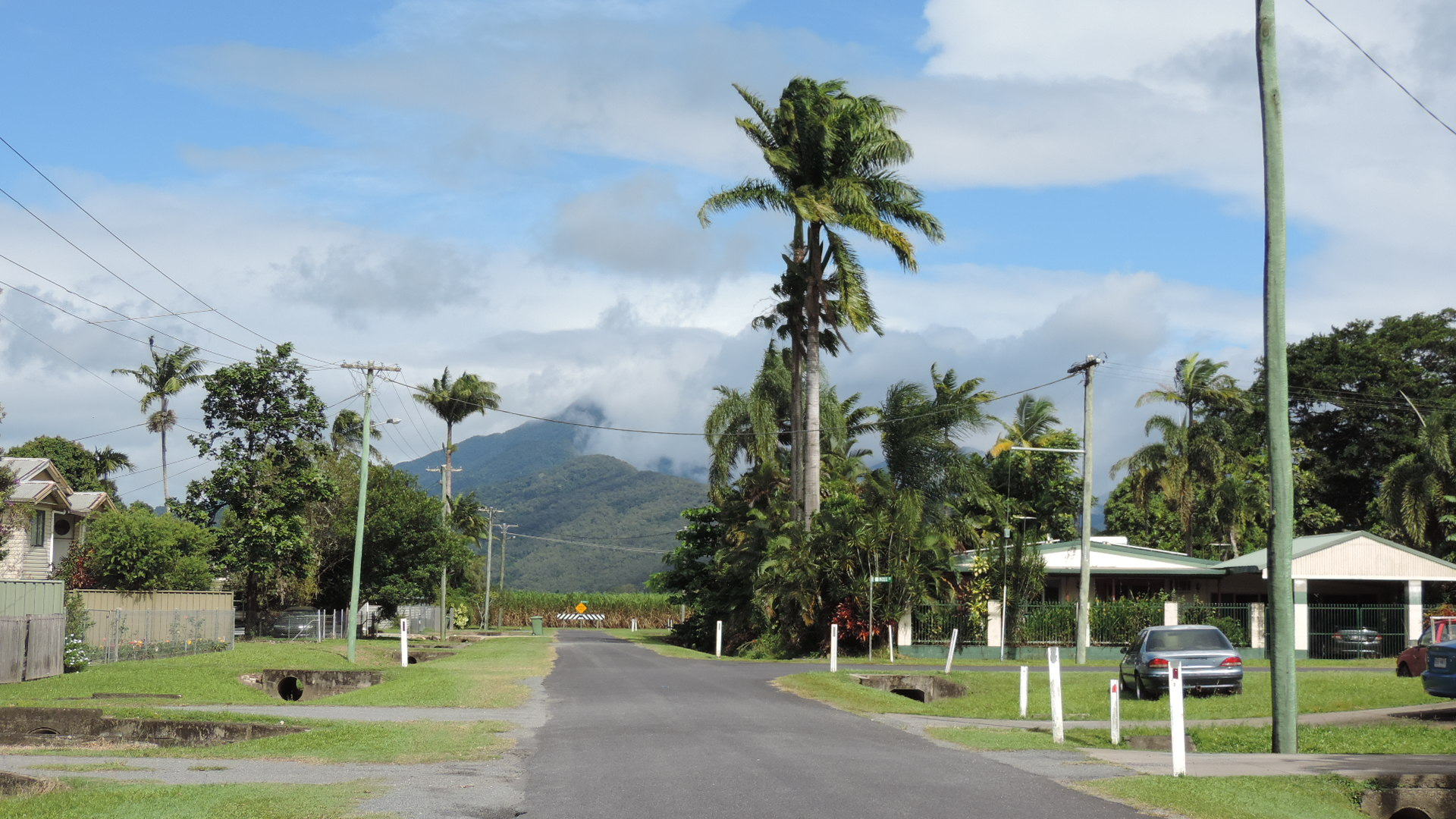
- Looking south down Nielsen Street, Alloomba, 2018

- Interactive map of Aloomba
- Coordinates: 17.11°S 145.8322°E
- Country: Australia
- State: Queensland
- LGA: Cairns Region
- Location: 6.7 km (4.2 mi) ESE of Gordonvale; 29.6 km (18.4 mi) S of Cairns CBD; 1,682 km (1,045 mi) NNW of Brisbane

Government
  - State electorate: Mulgrave
  - Federal division: Kennedy

Area
  - Total: 110.8 km^{2} (42.8 sq mi)

Population
  - Total: 576 (2021 census)
  - Density: 5.199/km^{2} (13.464/sq mi)
- Time zone: UTC+10:00 (AEST)
- Postcode: 4871
Localities around Aloomba
Gordonvale	Green Hill	Yarrabah
Wooroonooran	Aloomba	Yarrabah
Wooroonooran	Fishery Falls	Deeral

Aloomba is a rural town and a locality in the Cairns Region, Queensland, Australia. In the 2021 census, the locality of Aloomba had a population of 576 people.

== Geography ==
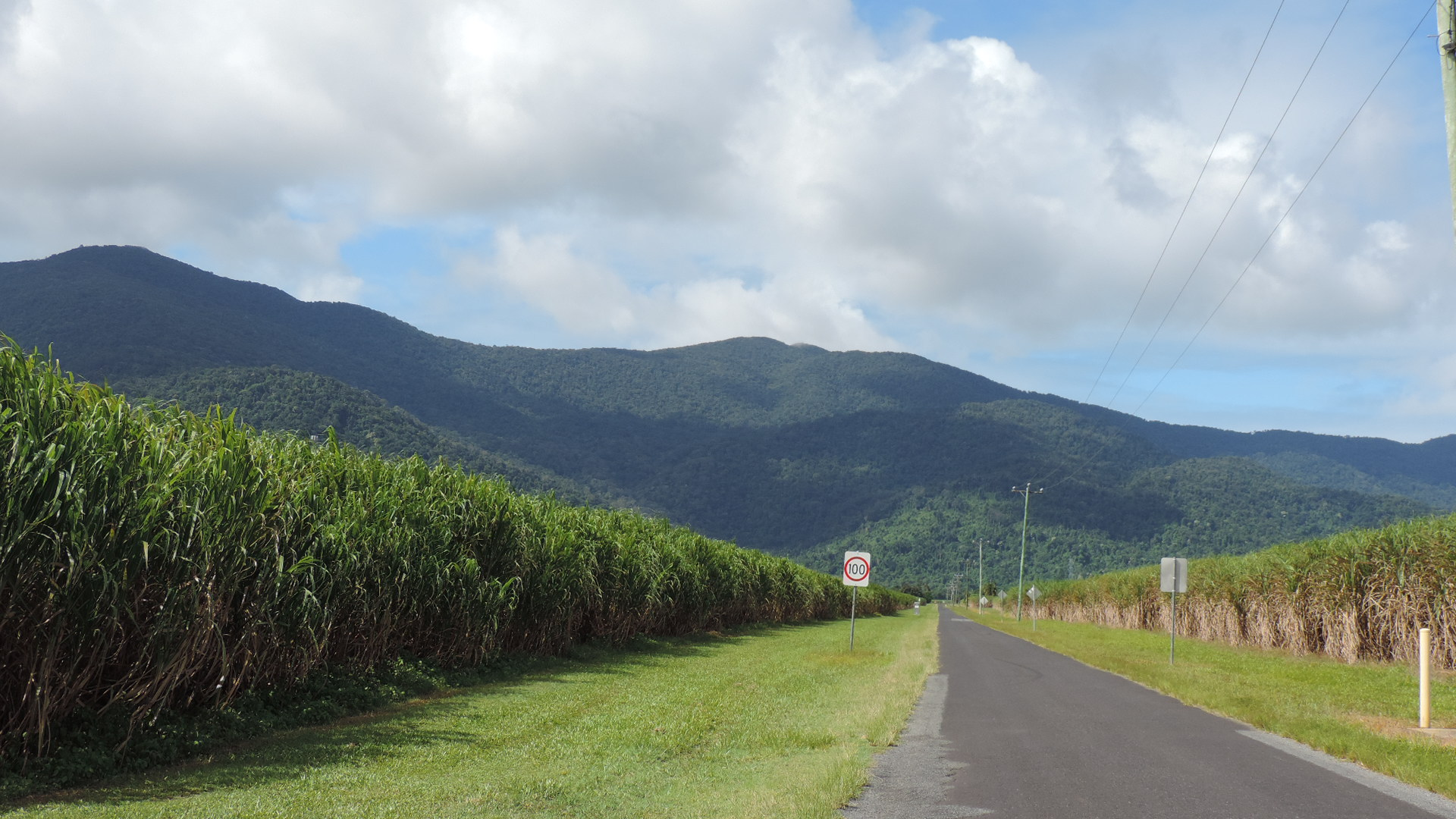
Looking east along Bennett Road, 2018

Aloomba is a long thin locality hemmed in east and west by mountain ranges. It is bounded to the north by the Mulgrave River which then passes through the west of the locality. The Bruce Highway passes through the west of the locality but not through the town which is about 2 kilometres (1.2 mi) east of the highway but about 4 kilometres (2.5 mi) away by road. The North Coast railway line enters the locality from the south immediately to the west of the highway but then veers to the east in order to pass through the town, after which the railway veers back towards the highway but does not rejoin it within the locality.

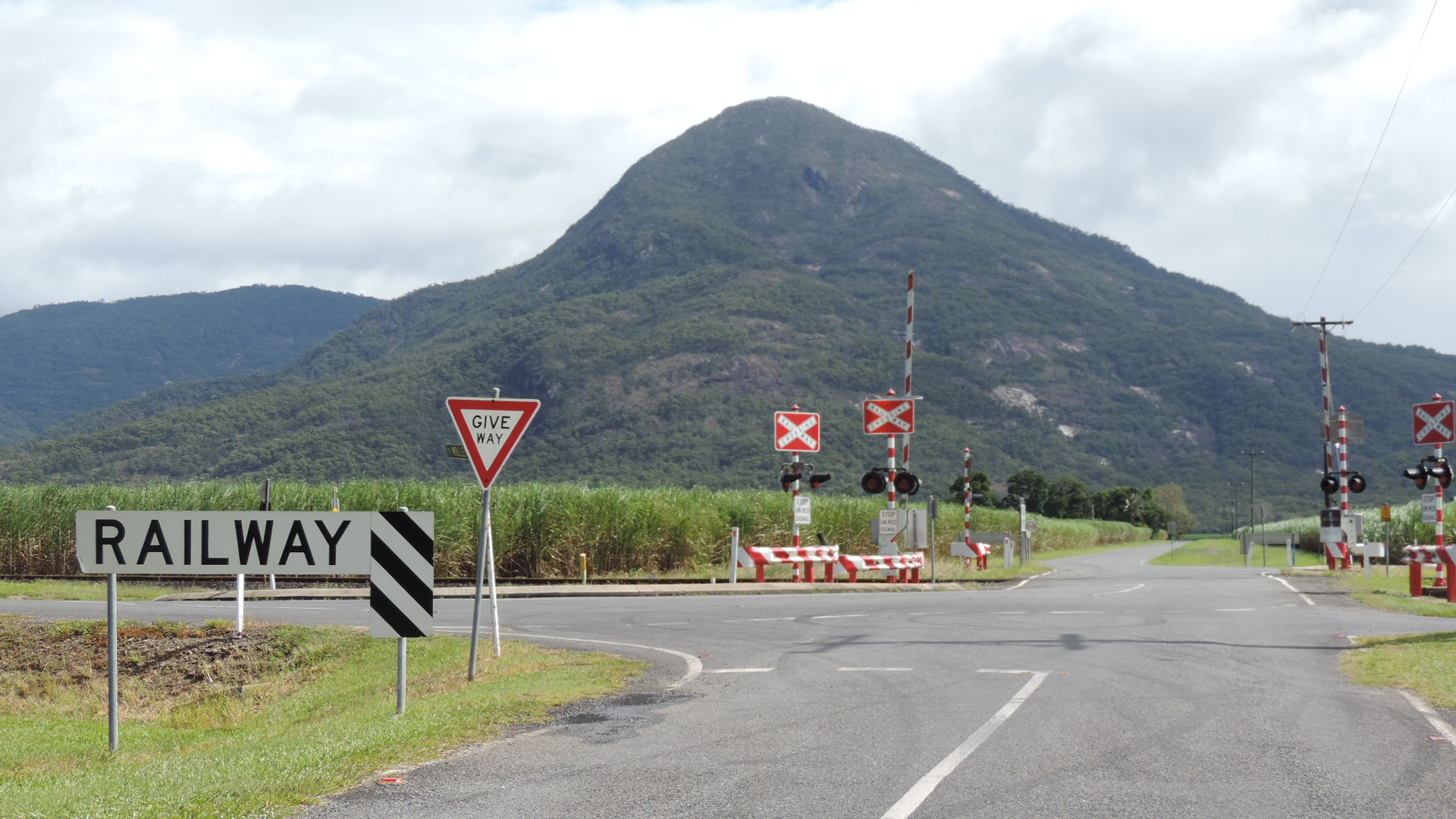
Looking west along Hesp Road across the North Coast railway line, 2018

The mountainous western part of the locality is within the Malbon Thompson Forest Reserve. The remainder is relatively flat freehold land used predominantly for farming, particularly growing sugarcane. There is a network of cane tramways to deliver the harvested sugarcane to the Mulgrave Sugar Mill in Gordonvale.

== History ==
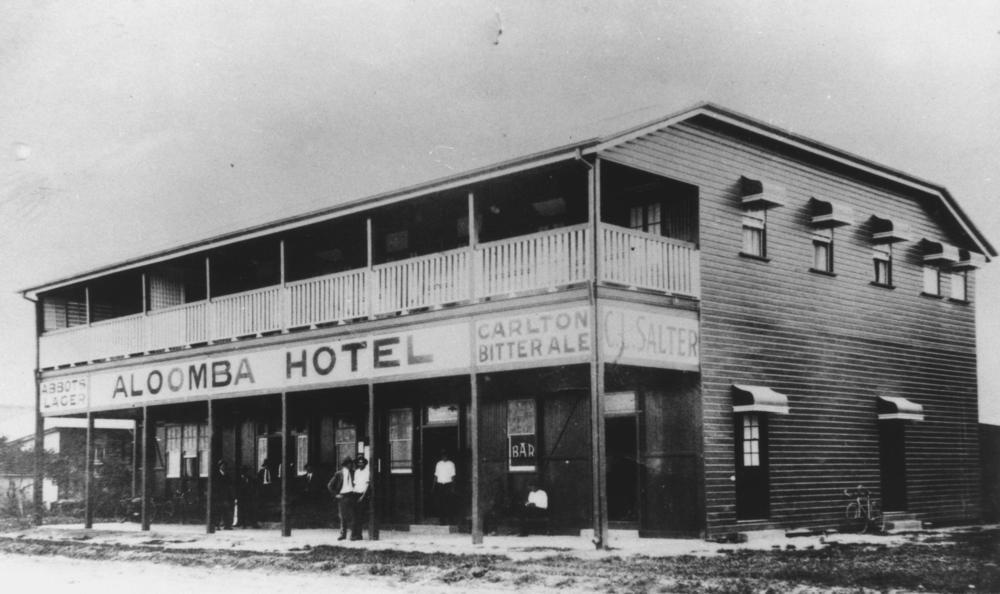
Aloomba Hotel, Aloomba, circa 1925

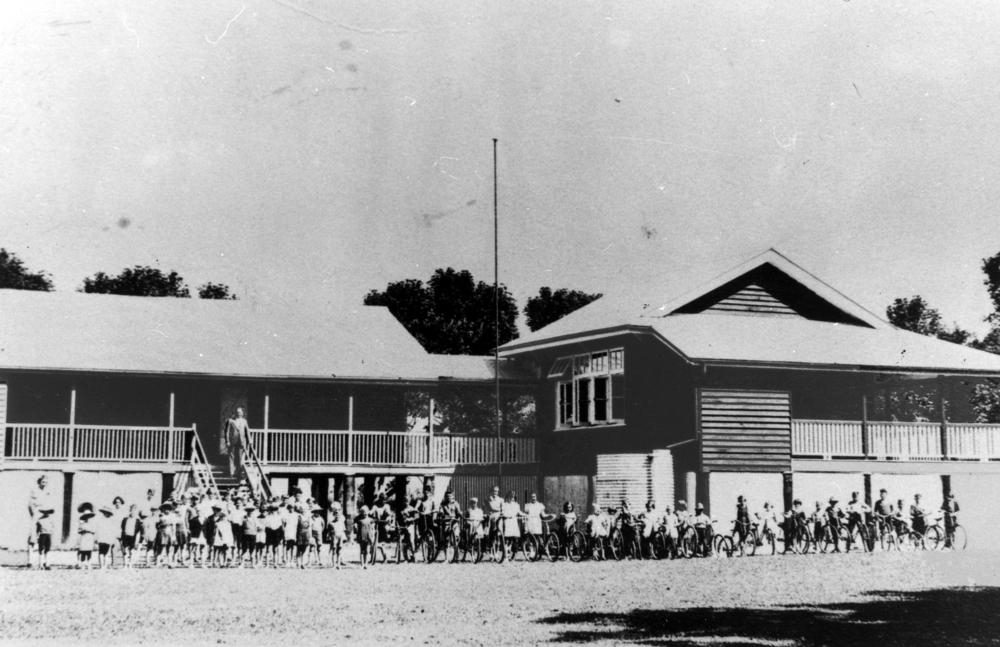
Aloomba State School, circa 1914

The town name is a corruption of the Yidinji word "Ngalumba", indicating hard milkwood tree (Alstonia muelleriana).

Aloomba Provisional School opened on 15 May 1899, becoming Aloomba State School on 1 January 1909.

On 20 April 1916, the Cane Beetles March commenced at Mooliba (now Mirriwinni). It was a snowball march to recruit men into the Australian Imperial Force during World War I at a time when enthusiasm to enlist had waned after the loss of life in the Gallipoli campaign. The march began at Mooliba with 4 men, passing through Babinda, Aloomba, Gordonvale, and Edmonton, and ending in Cairns 60 kilometres later with 29 recruits.

== Demographics ==
In the 2016 census, the locality of Aloomba had a population of 529 people.

In the 2021 census, the locality of Aloomba had a population of 576 people.

== Education ==
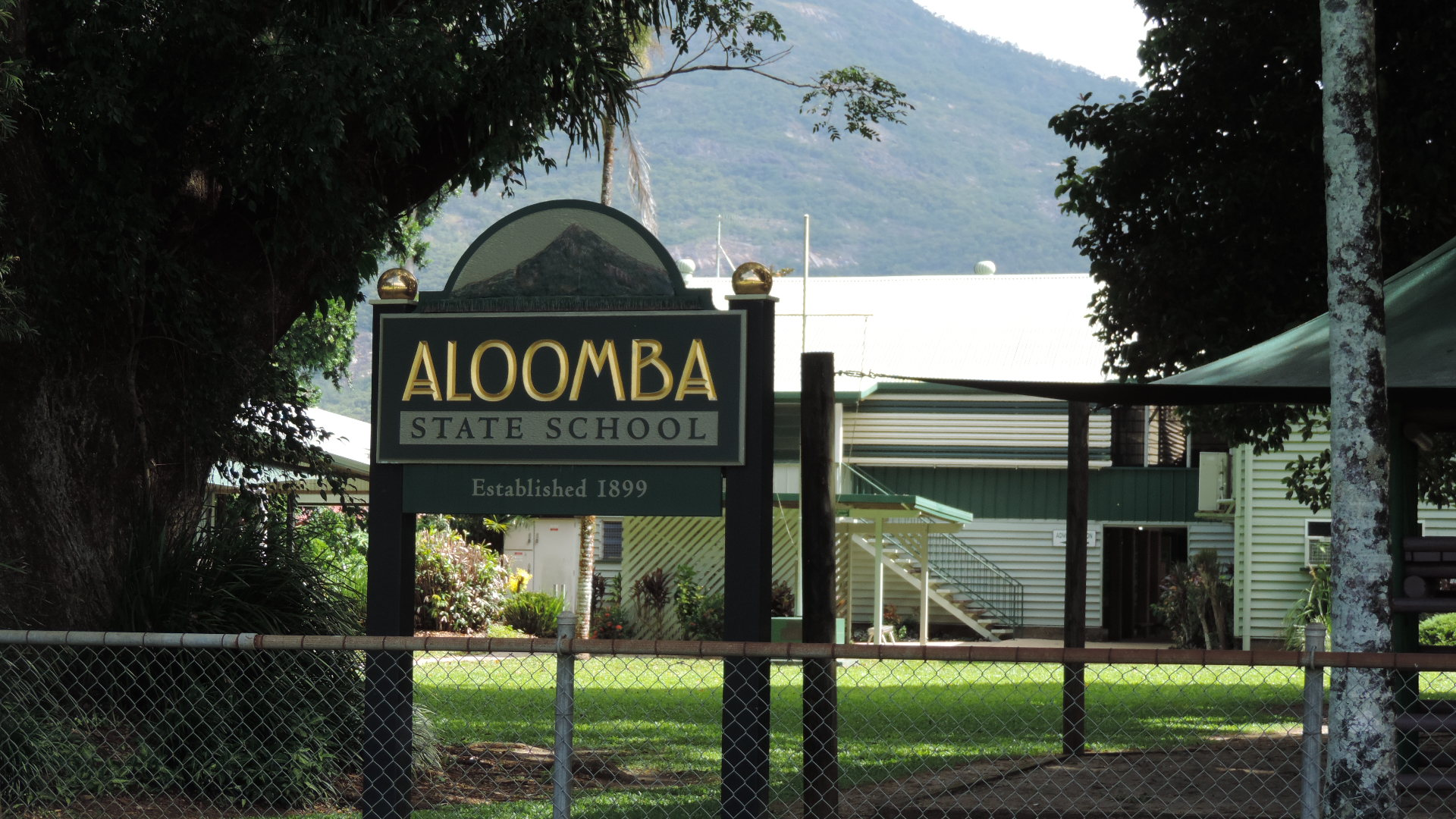
Aloomba State School, 2018

Aloomba State School is a government primary (Prep-6) school for boys and girls at Nielsen Street (17.1098°S 145.8319°E). In 2016, the school had an enrolment of 88 students with 7 teachers (6 full-time equivalent) and 8 non-teaching staff (3 full-time equivalent). In 2018, the school had an enrolment of 91 students with 7 teachers (6 full-time equivalent) and 9 non-teaching staff (3 full-time equivalent).

There are no secondary schools in Aloomba. The nearest government secondary school is Gordonvale State High School in neighbouring Gordonvale to the north-west.

== Amenities ==
Aloomba Community Hall is at 13-15 Anderson Road (next to Robert Rossi Park, 17.10846°S 145.83214°E). It is capable of seating up to 80 people and is operated by the Cairns Regional Council.

== Notable people ==
- Bunny Adair, Member of the Queensland Legislative Assembly for Cook attended Aloomba State School
