= Deeral, Queensland =

Deeral
- Town
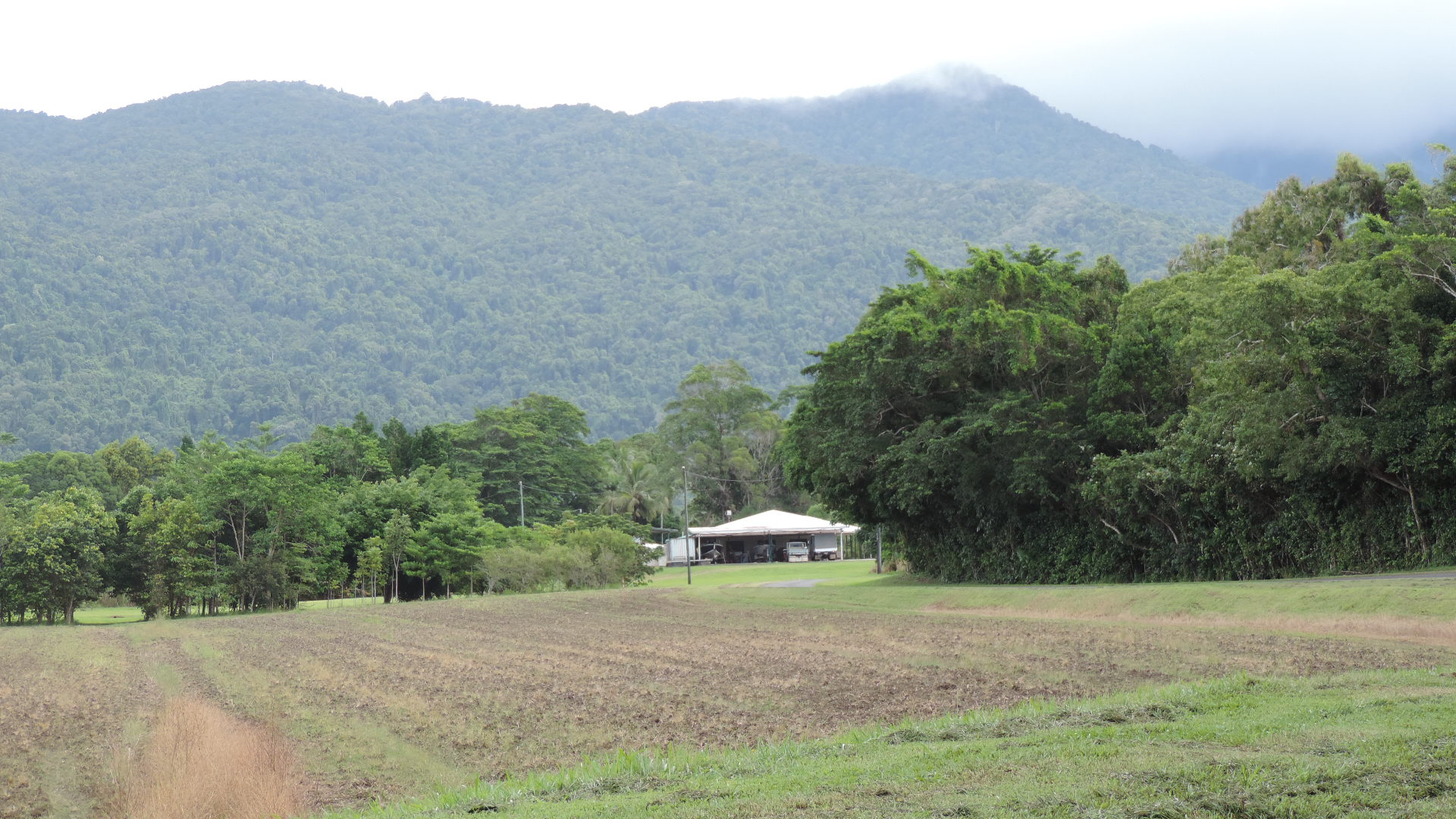
- Farm with Bellenden Ker Range in the background, 2018

- Interactive map of Deeral
- Coordinates: 17.2188°S 145.915°E
- Country: Australia
- State: Queensland
- LGA: Cairns Region
- Location: 15.1 km (9.4 mi) N of Babinda; 44.0 km (27.3 mi) SSE of Cairns; 303 km (188 mi) NNW of Townsville; 1,661 km (1,032 mi) NNW of Brisbane

Government
  - State electorate: Mulgrave
  - Federal division: Kennedy

Area
  - Total: 27.2 km^{2} (10.5 sq mi)

Population
  - Total: 151 (2021 census)
  - Density: 5.551/km^{2} (14.38/sq mi)
- Postcode: 4871
Localities around Deeral
Aloomba	Yarrabah	Coral Sea
Fishery Falls	Deeral	Coral Sea
Wooroonooran	Bellenden Ker	East Russell

Deeral is a town and coastal locality in the Cairns Region, Queensland, Australia. In the 2021 census, the locality of Deeral had a population of 151 people.

== Geography ==
Deeral has an unusual "J"-shape boundaries. The eastern part is a long section of beach facing the Coral Sea and its immediate hinterland; this land is undeveloped and controlled by the Queensland Government. The western part is a curved section of freehold land, cleared and used for farming especially sugarcane. Both of these areas are low-lying (less than 10 metres above sea level). In the very far west of the locality the land begins rising rapidly towards the adjacent Bellenden Ker Range in neighbouring Wooroonooran; this land is undeveloped.

The town is located in the south-western part of the locality. The Bruce Highway and the North Coast railway line traverse the locality, adjacent and parallel, from the south-west of the locality through to the north-west of the "curve of the J", passing through the town, which is served by the Deeral railway station (17.2222°S 145.9159°E) which was known as Munros Camp railway station from 1883 to 1912. Figtree Creek railway station (17.2064°S 145.9067°E) served the north of the locality but it is now abandoned.

The Mulgrave River forms the north-eastern boundary of the "curve", then crosses the locality to form the southern boundary of the eastern beach of the locality, entering the Mutchero Inlet and then to Coral Sea.

== History ==
The town was built on Yidinji tribal territory. The town's name was derived from its railway station's name which was named Deeral in 1912, an Aboriginal word in the Yidinyji language meaning teeth.

The locality also contains the town of Woolanmarroo, which was on the northern side of the Mutchero Inlet. Although land had been offered for sale in Woolanmarro since at least 1885, that land was never developed and remained in its natural state. The town site is now protected land within the Malbon Thompson Range National Park (created in June 2024).

== Demographics ==
In the 2016 census, the locality of Deeral had a population of 141 people.

In the 2021 census, the locality of Deeral had a population of 151 people.

== Education ==
There are no schools in Deeral. The nearest government primary schools are McDonnell Creek State School in neighbouring Fishery Falls to the west and Bellenden Ker State School in neighbouring Bellenden Ker to the south. The nearest government secondary school is Babinda State School in Babinda to the south. There is also a Catholic primary school in Babinda.

== Amenities ==
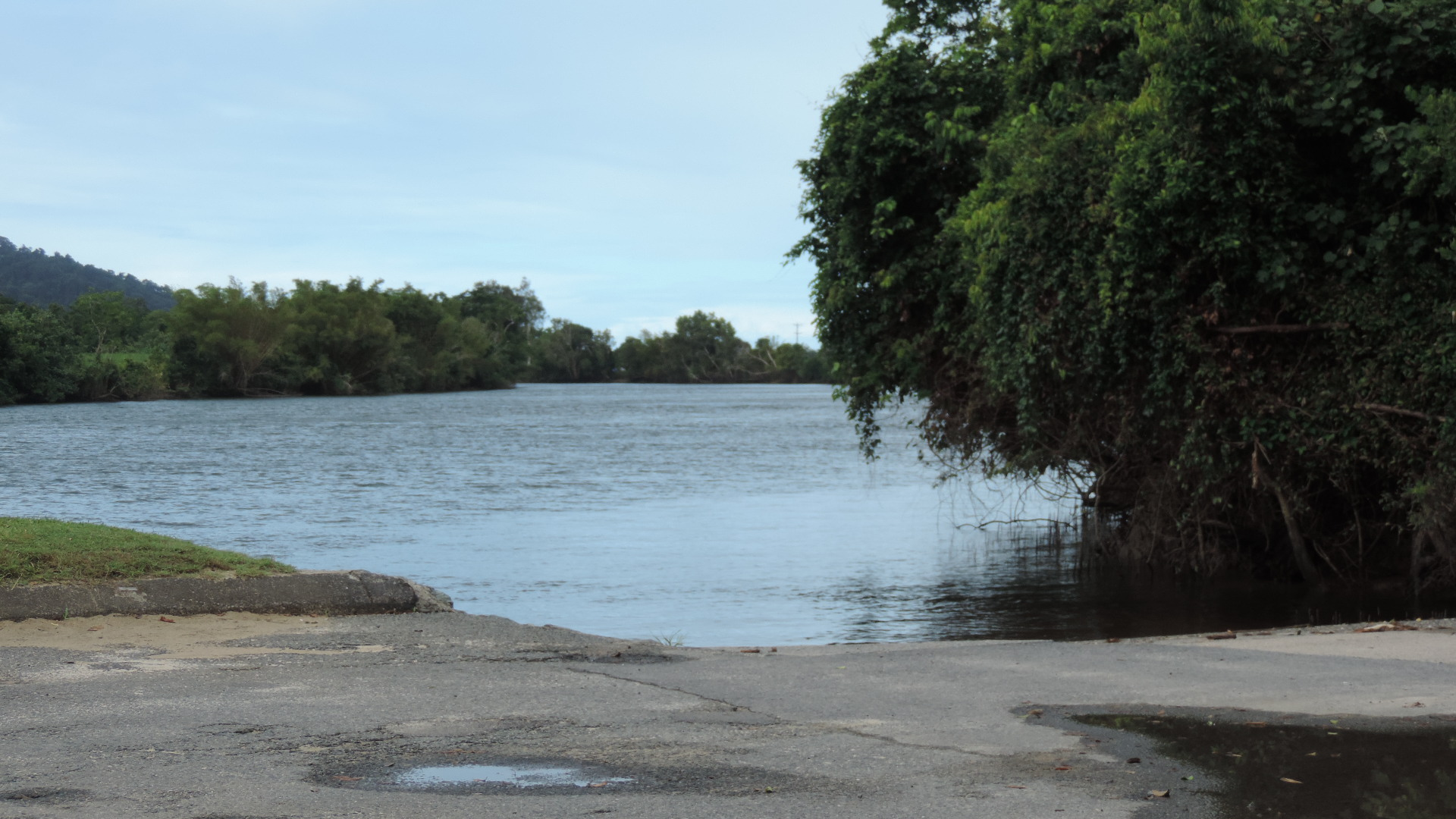
Boat ramp into the Mulgrave River, Ross Road, 2018

The Deeral branch of the Queensland Country Women's Association meets at the CWA Hall at 68925 Bruce Highway.

There is a boat ramp on Ross River on the south bank of the Mulgrave River (17.2172°S 145.9206°E). It is managed by the Cairns Regional Council.
