= Fishery Falls, Queensland =

Fishery Falls
- Suburb
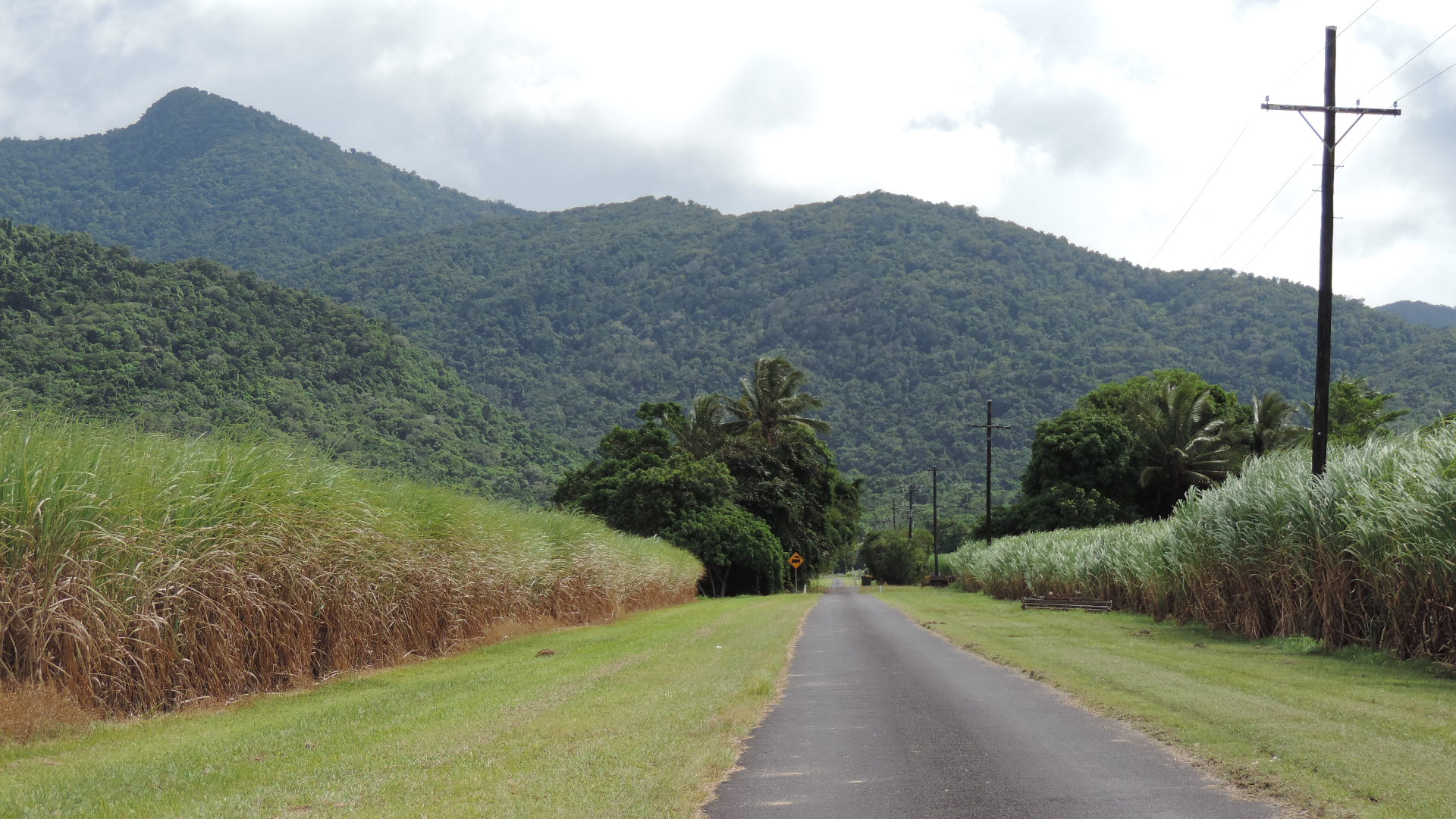
- Sugar cane fields, looking west along Stewart Road towards the Bellenden Ker Range, 2018

- Interactive map of Fishery Falls
- Coordinates: 17.1863°S 145.8908°E
- Country: Australia
- State: Queensland
- LGA: Cairns Region
- Location: 16.4 km (10.2 mi) SE of Gordonvale; 19.8 km (12.3 mi) N of Babinda; 39.3 km (24.4 mi) SSE of Cairns CBD; 1,670 km (1,040 mi) NNW of Brisbane

Government
  - State electorate: Mulgrave
  - Federal division: Kennedy

Area
  - Total: 14.8 km^{2} (5.7 sq mi)

Population
  - Total: 205 (2021 census)
  - Density: 13.85/km^{2} (35.87/sq mi)
- Time zone: UTC+10:00 (AEST)
- Postcode: 4871
Suburbs around Fishery Falls
Aloomba	Aloomba	Aloomba
Wooroonooran	Fishery Falls	Aloomba
Wooroonooran	Deeral	Deeral

Fishery Falls is a rural locality in the Cairns Region, Queensland, Australia. In the 2021 census, Fishery Falls had a population of 205 people.

== Geography ==
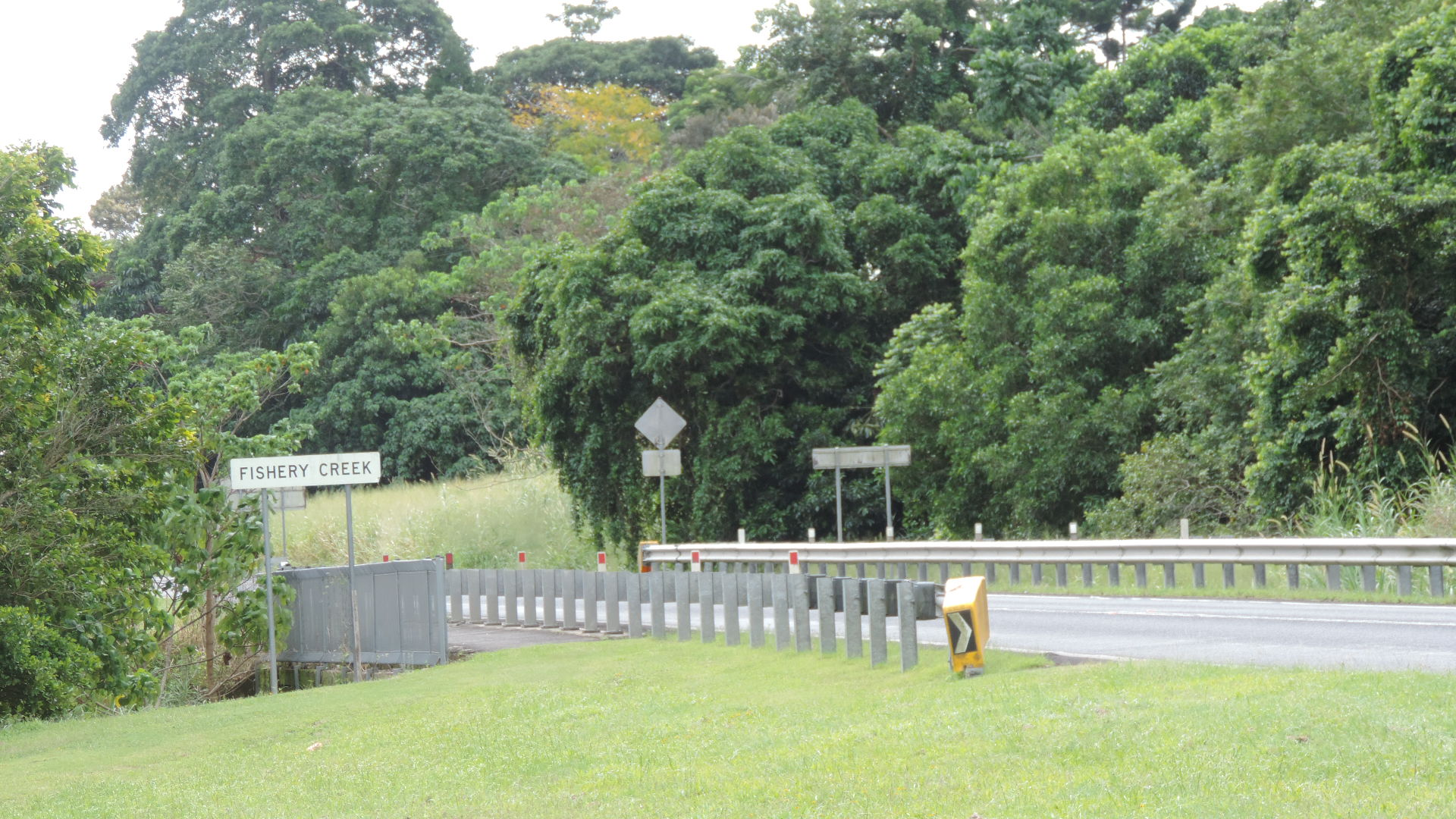
Bruce Highway crosses Fishery Creek, 2018

The Mulgrave River forms the eastern boundary of the locality; it flows into the Coral Sea in the neighbouring locality of Deeral. The land in the locality is flat (about 10 metres above sea level) and is predominantly freehold farming land with sugarcane the principal crop.

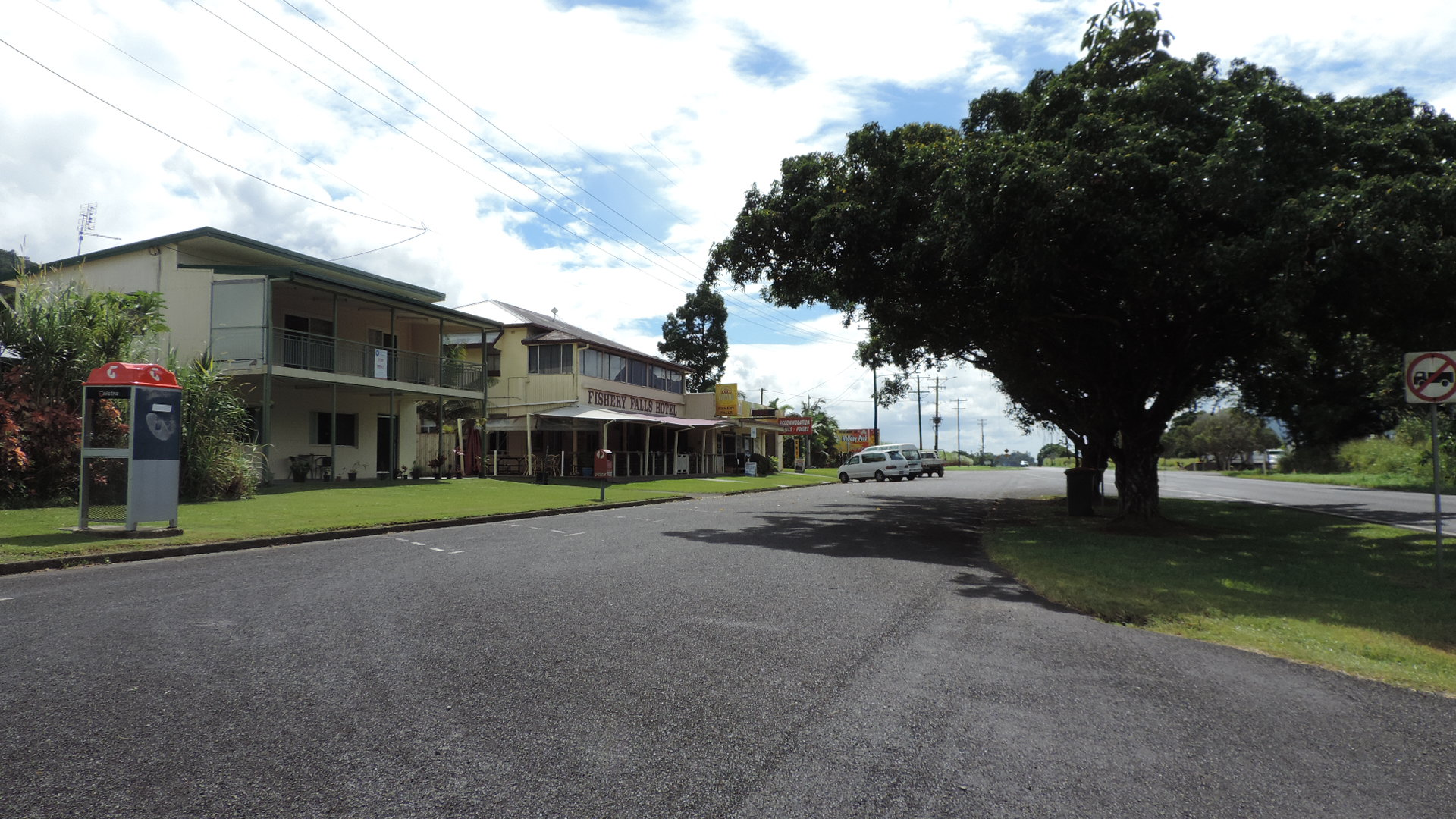
Fishery Falls township along the Bruce Highway, 2018

The Bruce Highway passes through the locality from south to north-west with the North Coast railway line running immediately parallel and east of the highway. Today, there is no railway station within Fishery Falls, but historically there were three, all now abandoned (from north to south):

- Mount Sophia railway station (17.1625°S 145.8763°E)
- Fishery Falls railway station (17.1814°S 145.8862°E)
- McDonnell Creek railway station (17.1924°S 145.8929°E)

There is also a cane tramway network within the area to deliver the sugarcane to the Mulgrave Sugar Mill in Gordonvale.

Although there is no official town, there is a hotel, a large caravan park, and a number of streets of houses clustered just west of the Bruce Highway at 17.1840°S 145.8862°E, although the school is located 2 km south of this township.

== History ==
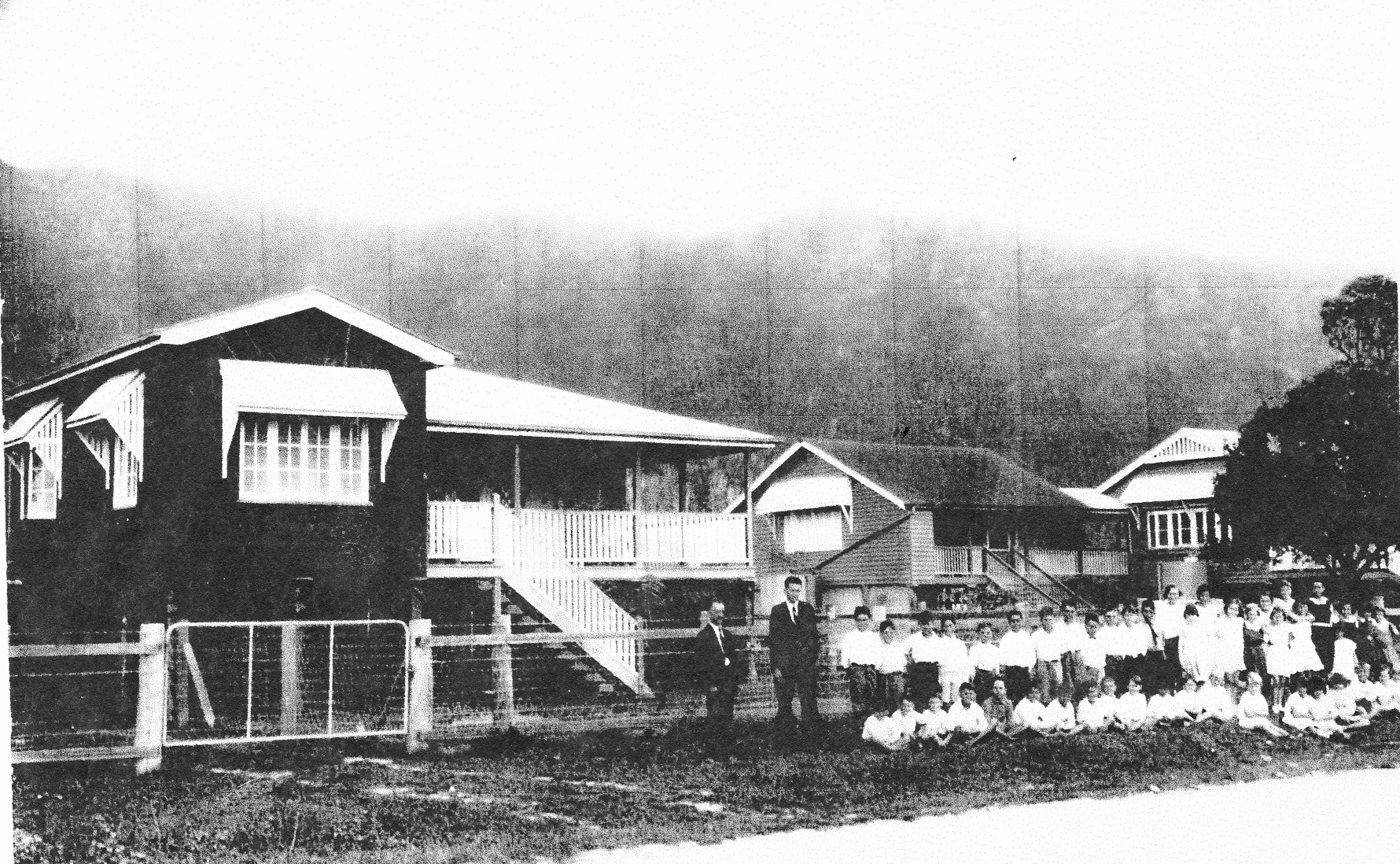
McDonnell Creek State School, 1942

The locality is presumed to be named after the waterfall of the same name which is located in neighboroughing Wooroonooran approximately 1 kilometre (0.62 mi) west of the locality of Fishery Falls.

McDonald's Creek State School opened on 22 September 1913. In 1916, the spelling was changed to McDonnell's Creek State School. It is now simply known as McDonnell Creek State School.

== Demographics ==
In the 2016 census, Fishery Falls had a population of 141 people.

In the 2021 census, Fishery Falls had a population of 205 people.

== Education ==
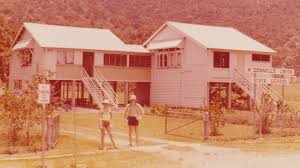
McDonnell Creek State School, circa 1970s

McDonnell Creek State School is a government primary (Prep-6) school for boys and girls at 69273 Bruce Highway (17.1966°S 145.8973°E). In 2016, the school had an enrolment of 25 students with 2 teachers (1 full-time equivalent) and 6 non-teaching staff (2 full-time equivalent). In 2018, the school had an enrolment of 14 students with 3 teachers (1 full-time equivalent) and 6 non-teaching staff (2 full-time equivalent).

As the name suggests, the school is located very near to McDonnell Creek approximately 2 kilometres (1.2 mi) south of the township.

There are no secondary schools in Fishery Falls. The nearest government secondary schools are Gordonvale State High School in Gordonvale to the north-west and Babinda State School in Babinda to the south.

== Attractions ==
The South Sea Islander Memorial at the corner of the Bruce Highway and McMahon Drive commemorates over 60,000 Kanakas who were contracted to work in the sugarcane plantations from 1863 to 1906. Although some came voluntarily, others were misinformed about their contracts or were kidnapped (a practice known as blackbirding).

== See also ==
- List of waterfalls
- List of waterfalls in Australia
