= High Island (Queensland) =

Island in Queensland, Australia

Nickname: Caparra Island
- Interactive map of High Island

Geography
- Coordinates: 17.158°S 146.010°E

Administration
- Australia
- State: Queensland
- City: Frankland Islands

High Island, in North Queensland, Australia is part of the Frankland Islands, 30 km northeast of Babinda, and 45 km southwest of Cairns.

The Frankland Islands are teeming with permanent and migratory marine life, especially the green sea turtle which nests on the island. Normanby Island, part of the Frankland Islands group, offers a comprehensive reef system with a tropical island.

The islands are very popular with reef tour operators working from Cairns.

The alternative name for this island is Caparra Island.

The island was used as a filming location in Ocean Girl.
