= Bramston Beach, Queensland =

Bramston Beach
- Town
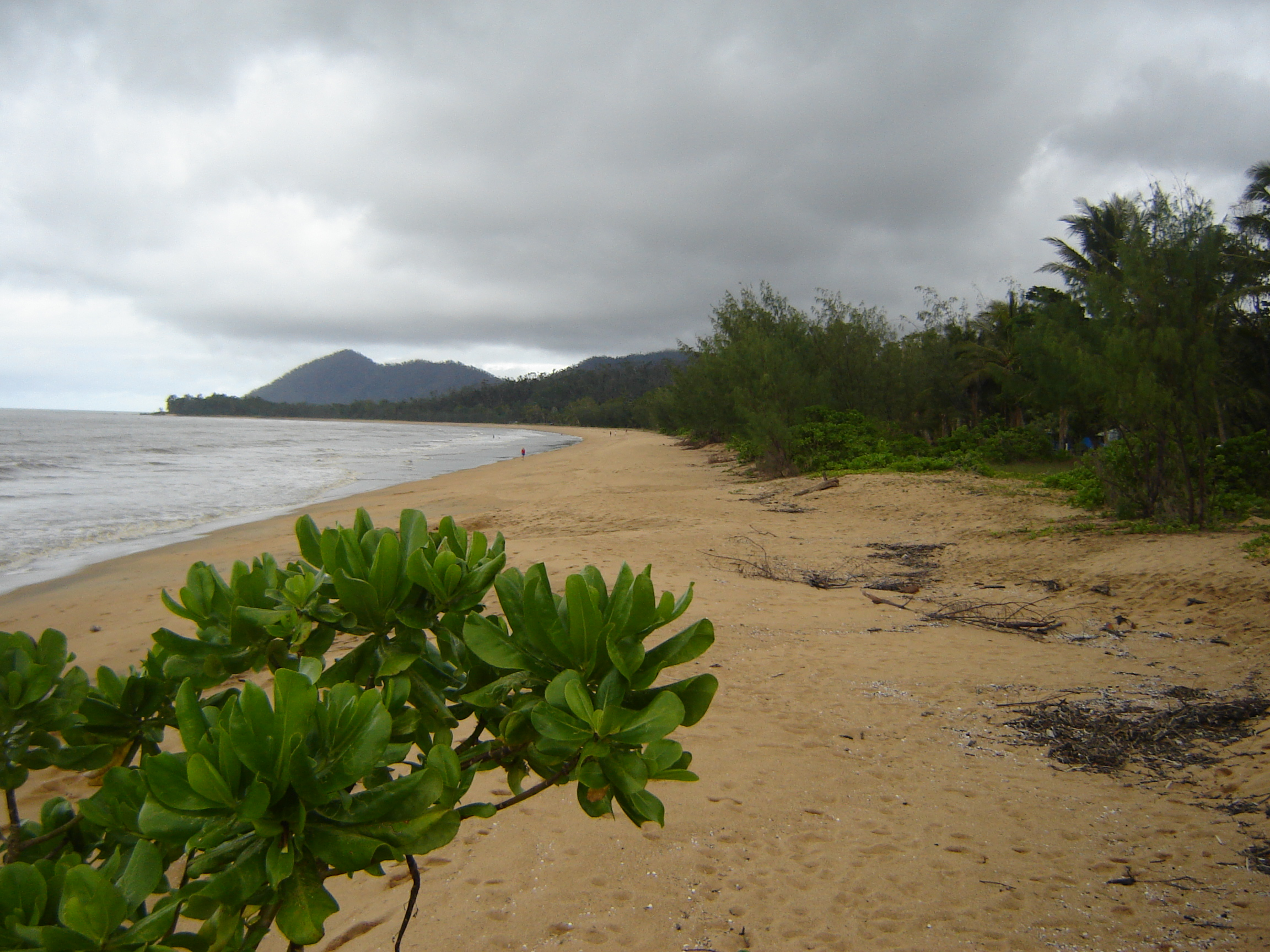
- Bramston Beach

- Interactive map of Bramston Beach
- Coordinates: 17.3538°S 146.0247°E
- Country: Australia
- State: Queensland
- LGA: Cairns Region
- Location: 24.1 km (15.0 mi) E of Babinda; 82.1 km (51.0 mi) SSE of Cairns; 298 km (185 mi) NNW of Townsville; 1,651 km (1,026 mi) NNW of Brisbane

Government
  - State electorate: Hill
  - Federal division: Kennedy

Area
  - Total: 55.6 km^{2} (21.5 sq mi)

Population
  - Total: 173 (2021 census)
  - Density: 3.112/km^{2} (8.059/sq mi)
- Time zone: UTC+10:00 (AEST)
- Postcode: 4871
Localities around Bramston Beach
East Russell	East Russell	Coral Sea
East Russell	Bramston Beach	Coral Sea
Eubenangee	Eubenangee	Eubenangee

Bramston Beach is a coastal town and rural locality in Cairns Region, Queensland, Australia. In the 2021 census, the locality of Bramston Beach had a population of 173 people.

== Geography ==
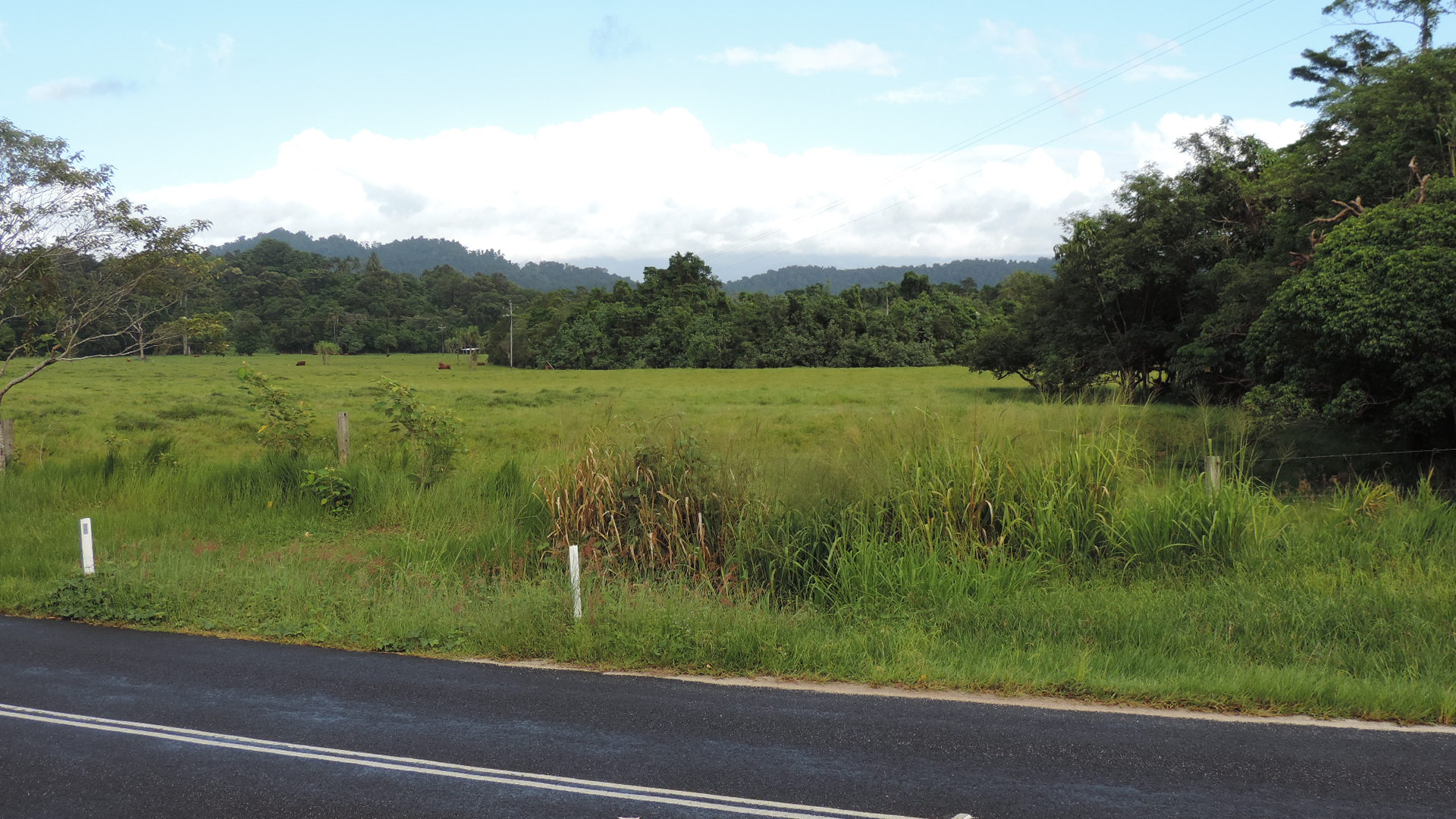
Looking west across fields from Bramston Beach Road, 2018

Bramston Beach is located 60 kilometres (37 mi) south of the regional centre of Cairns. It is located 17 kilometres (11 mi) east of the Bruce Highway and is accessed from the highway via Bramston Beach Road.

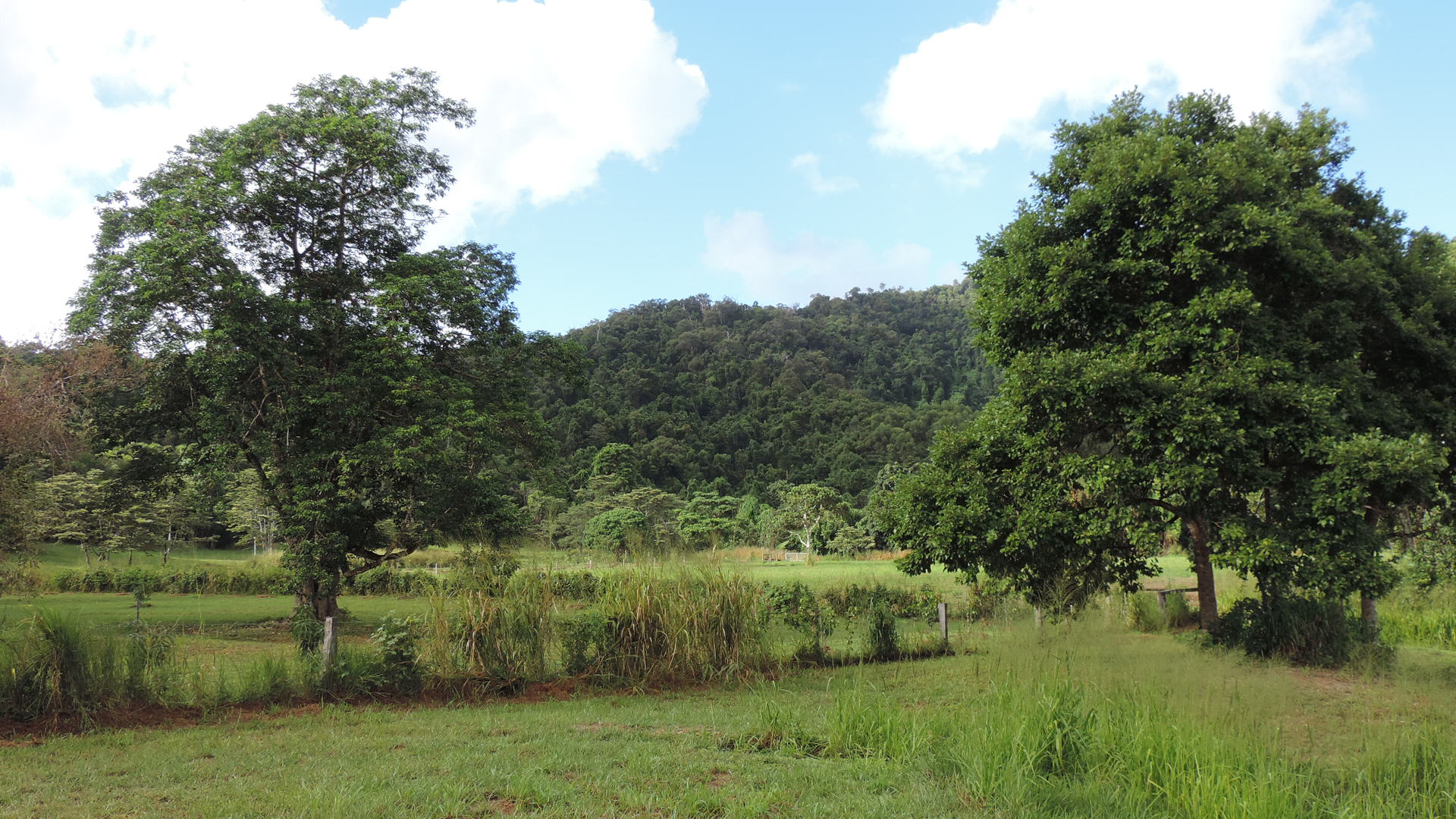
Looking south over fields from Bramston Beach Road, 2018

The Bramston Beach locality comprises two coastal plain areas each surrounded by small mountain ranges. The locality is bounded along the north-east by the Coral Sea and by the small mountain ranges.

The northern coastal plain is partly within the Russell River National Park with the remainder used for agriculture, principally grazing. Bramston Beach Road passes through the southern part of the northern coastal plain through to the sandy beach there. The small residential and camping area is located at the end of the road by the beach.

The southern coastal plain area also features a sandy beach but there are no formed roads through the area, only tracks. It is entirely freehold land used for agriculture, again principally grazing.

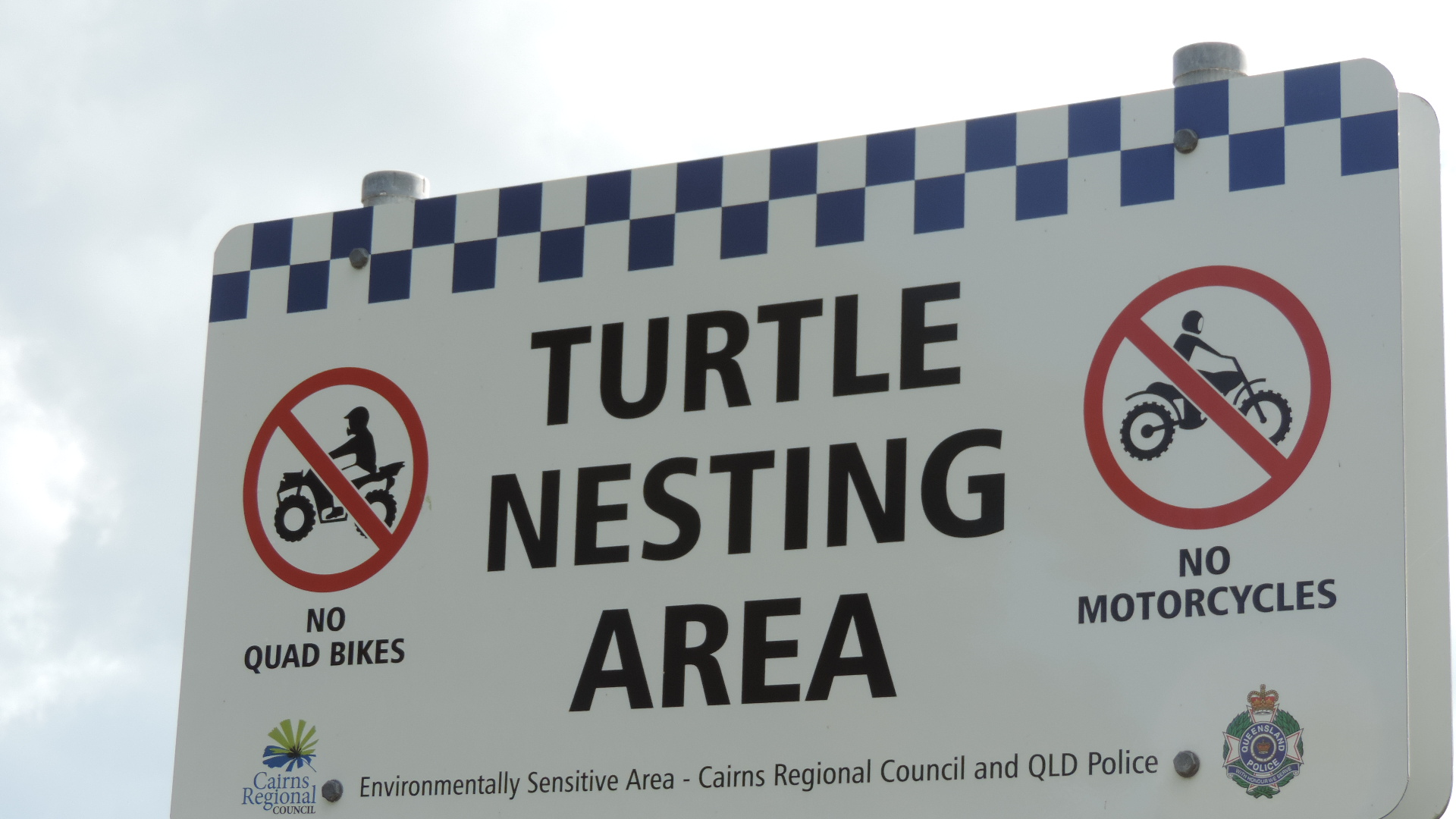
Turtle Nesting Area advisory sign, 2018

The beach at Bramston Beach is a turtle nesting area but is suffering from natural and manmade threats to the nesting area. There are also crocodiles in the area.

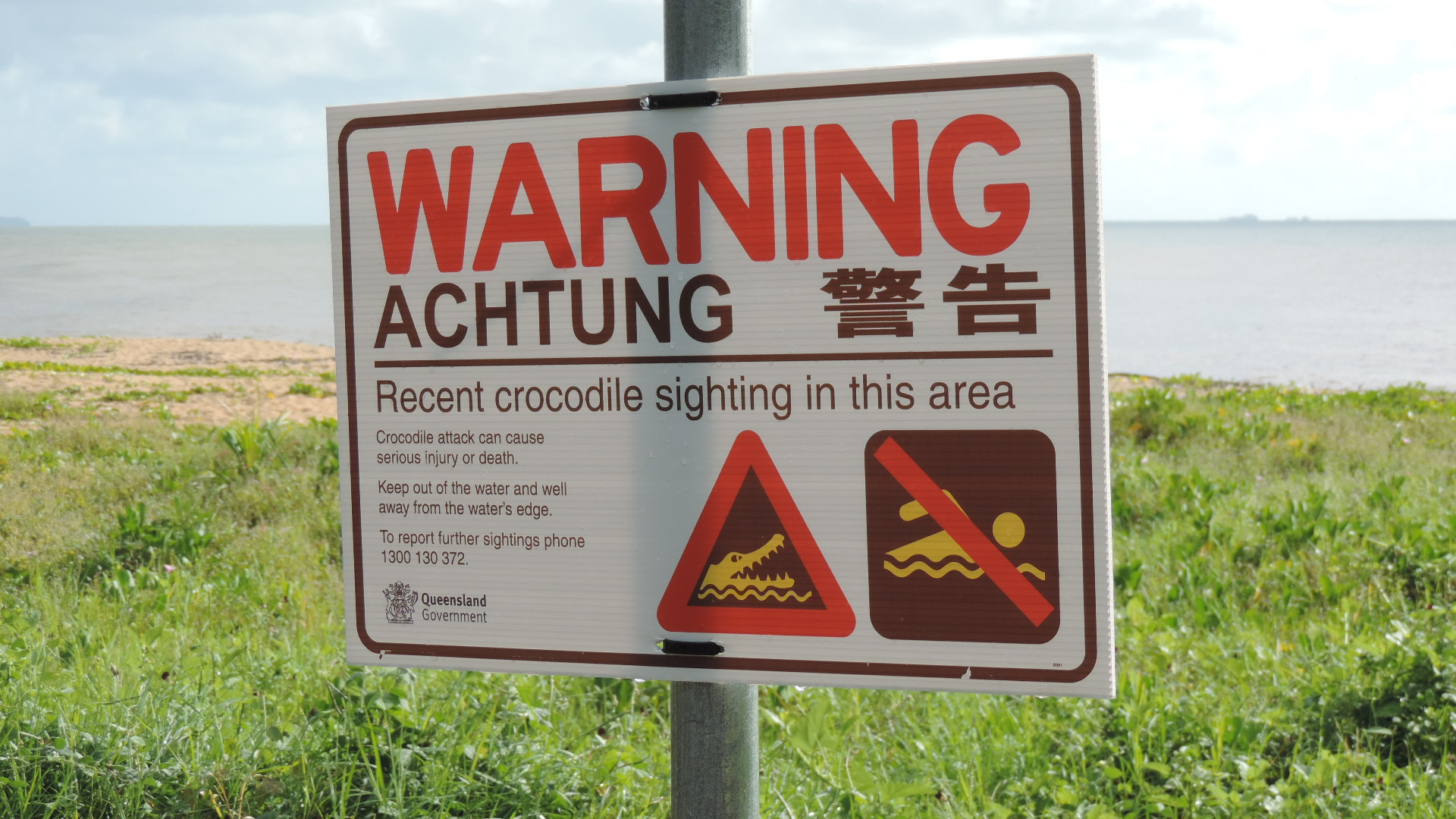
Crocodile warning sign, 2018

It is a popular spot with caravaners and is a good fishing location and has a slightly older than average population.

== History ==
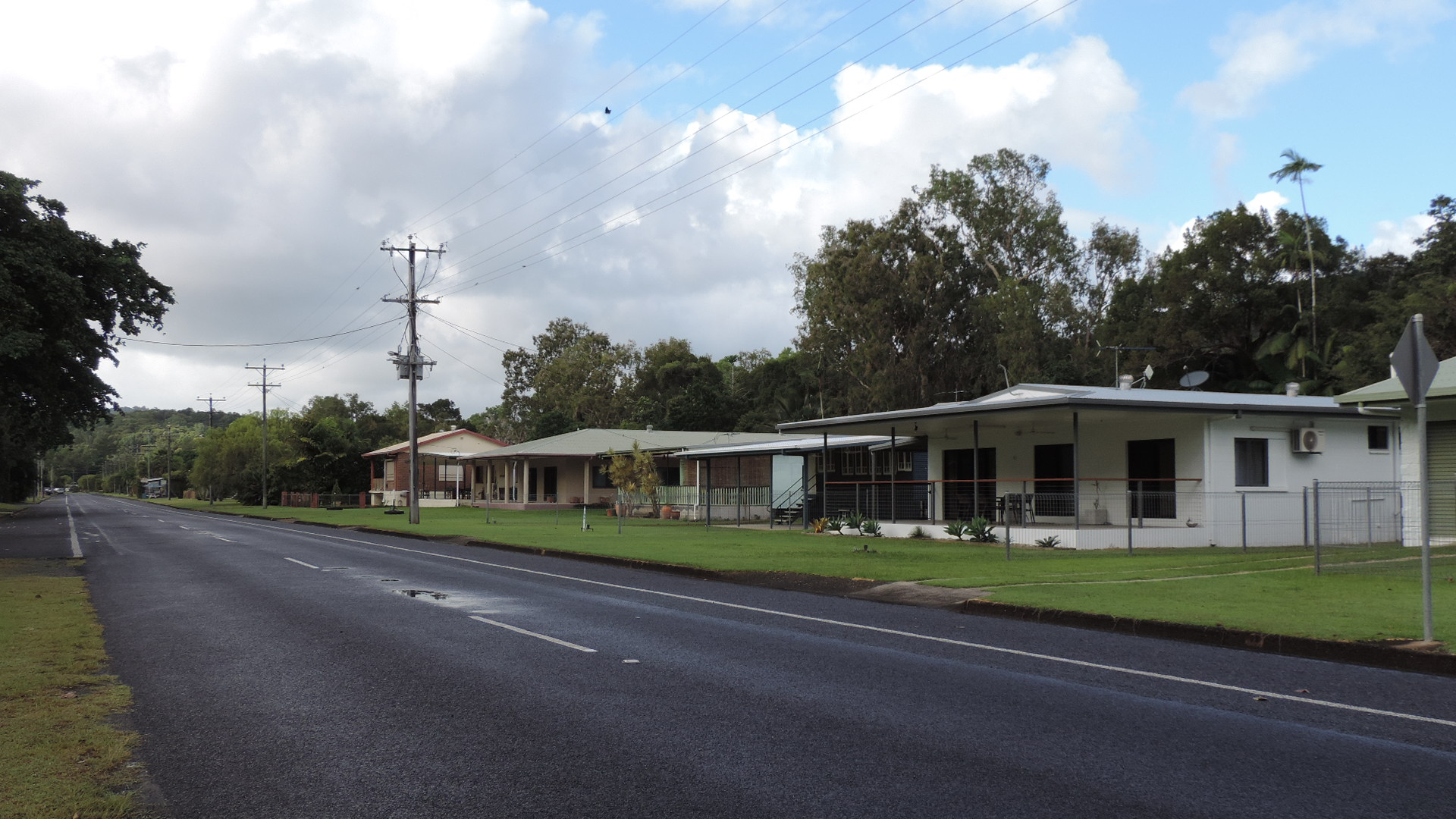
Houses, Evans Road, 2018

The town is named after Sir John Bramston, an early politician in Queensland.

In March 1872, after the wreck of The Maria on Bramble reef, one of the groups of survivors landed their raft just to the south of Cooper Point. The Djiru people in the area were exceedingly hospitable in feeding and sheltering this group until Captain John Moresby arrived in the Basilisk to return them to the British settlements further south. This group of survivors spent much of their time at a Djiru village that was located at modern day Bramston Beach. Some Djiru villages in the area consisted of quite large huts with multiple entrances. W.T. Forster, a member of this group of castaways recorded his experiences with the Djiru in a pamphlet published later on in 1872. Forster and some officials returned later to thank the Djiru and give gifts of blankets, but the village was devoid of people due to the Native Police having visited the locality the previous day.

The 1996 film, The Island of Dr. Moreau (1996_film), was filmed here.

The 1998 film, The Thin Red Line, was partially filmed on Bramston Beach.

== Demographics ==
In the 2006 census, the town of Bramston Beach had a population of 196 people.

In the 2011 census, the locality of Bramston Beach had a population of 154 people.

In the 2016 census, the locality of Bramston Beach had a population of 174 people.

In the 2021 census, the locality of Bramston Beach had a population of 173 people.

== Education ==
There are no schools in Bramston Beach. The nearest government primary school is Mirriwinni State School in Mirriwinni to the south-west. The nearest government secondary school is Babinda State School (to Year 12) in Babinda to the west.
