= Frankland Group National Park =

National park in Australia

- IUCN category II (national park)
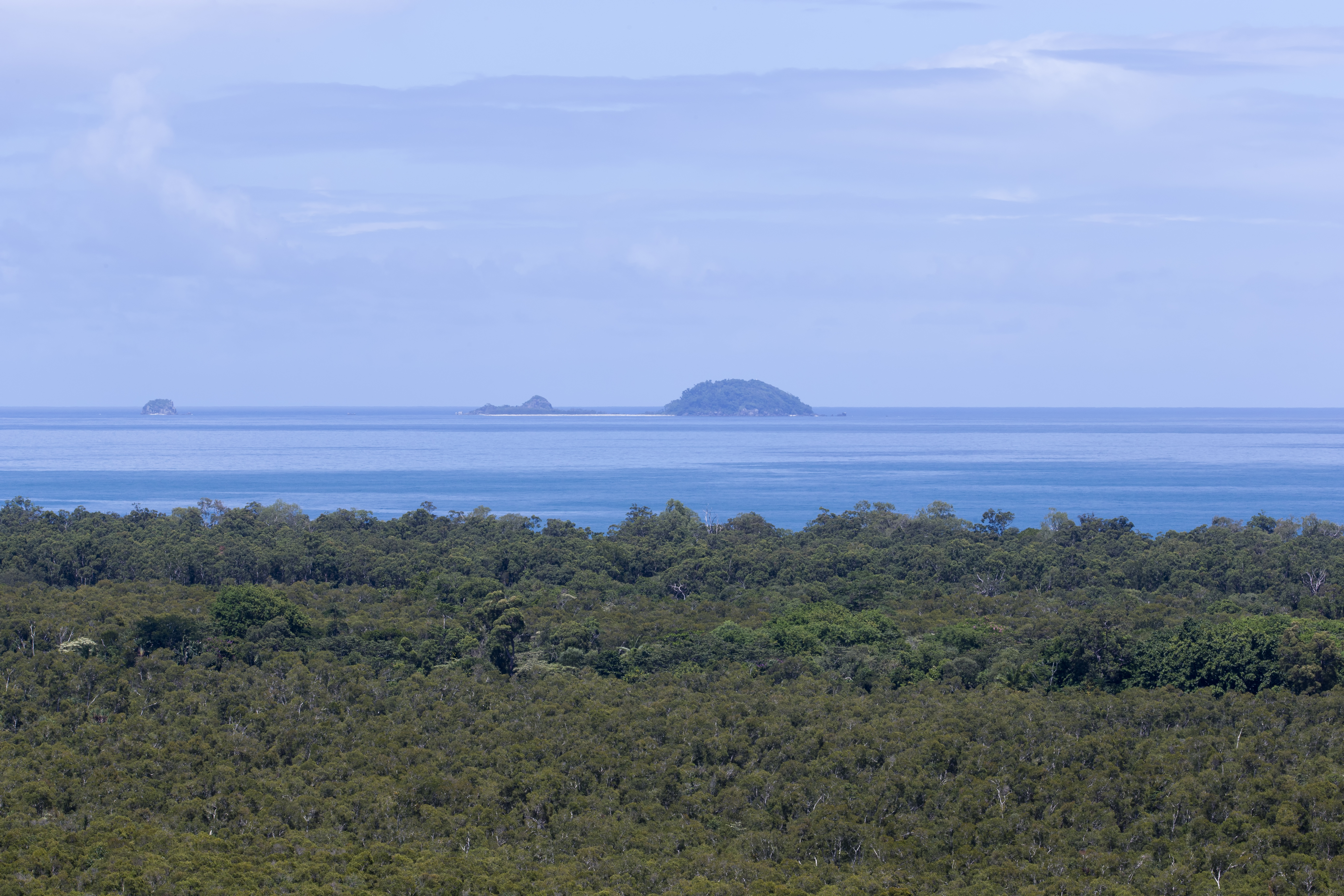
- Frankland Islands from Wyvuri Station

- Location within Queensland
- Location: Queensland
- Coordinates: 17°09′49″S 146°00′42″E
- Area: 77 ha (190 acres)
- Established: 1994
- Governing body: Queensland Parks and Wildlife Service
- Website: Official website

Frankland Group is a national park in Queensland, Australia, 1353 km northwest of Brisbane. The five continental islands of the Frankland Group are High Island, Normanby Island, Mabel Island, Round Island and Russell Island, which lie about 10 km offshore, and are about 45 km south east of Cairns. They are the traditional home of the Mandingalbay Yidinji, and the Gungandji Aboriginal peoples. On 9 June 1770, on the First voyage of James Cook, Cook named the island group after Admiral Sir Thomas Frankland, 5th Baronet (1718–1784).

A large number of birds are supported here, including numerous seabirds, as well as pied imperial pigeons, fruit doves, varied honeyeaters, and white-breasted woodswallows.

== See also ==
- Protected areas of Queensland
- Australian places named by James Cook

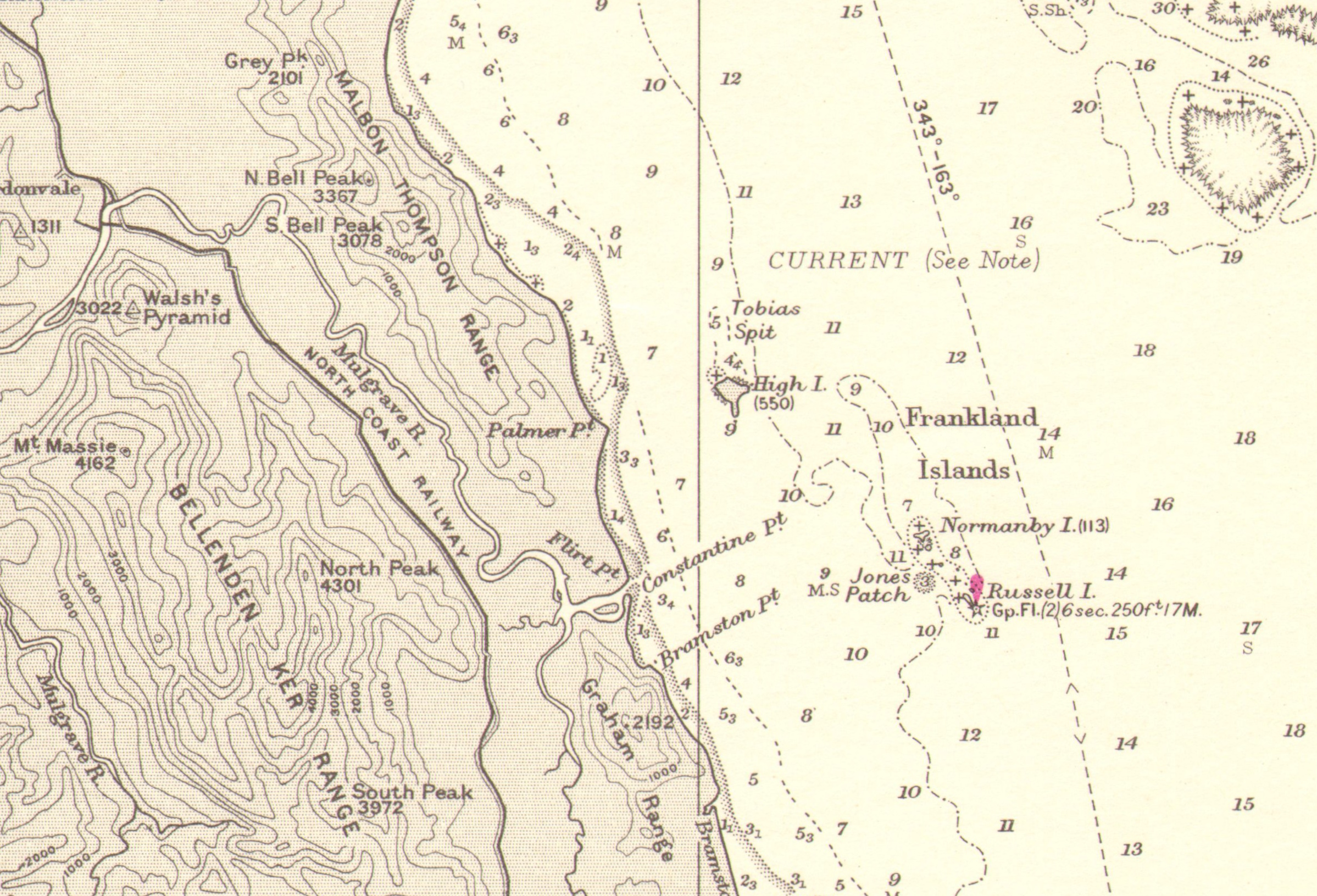
Frankland Islands from a 1959 nautical chart
