= Bellenden Ker, Queensland =

Bellenden Ker
- Town
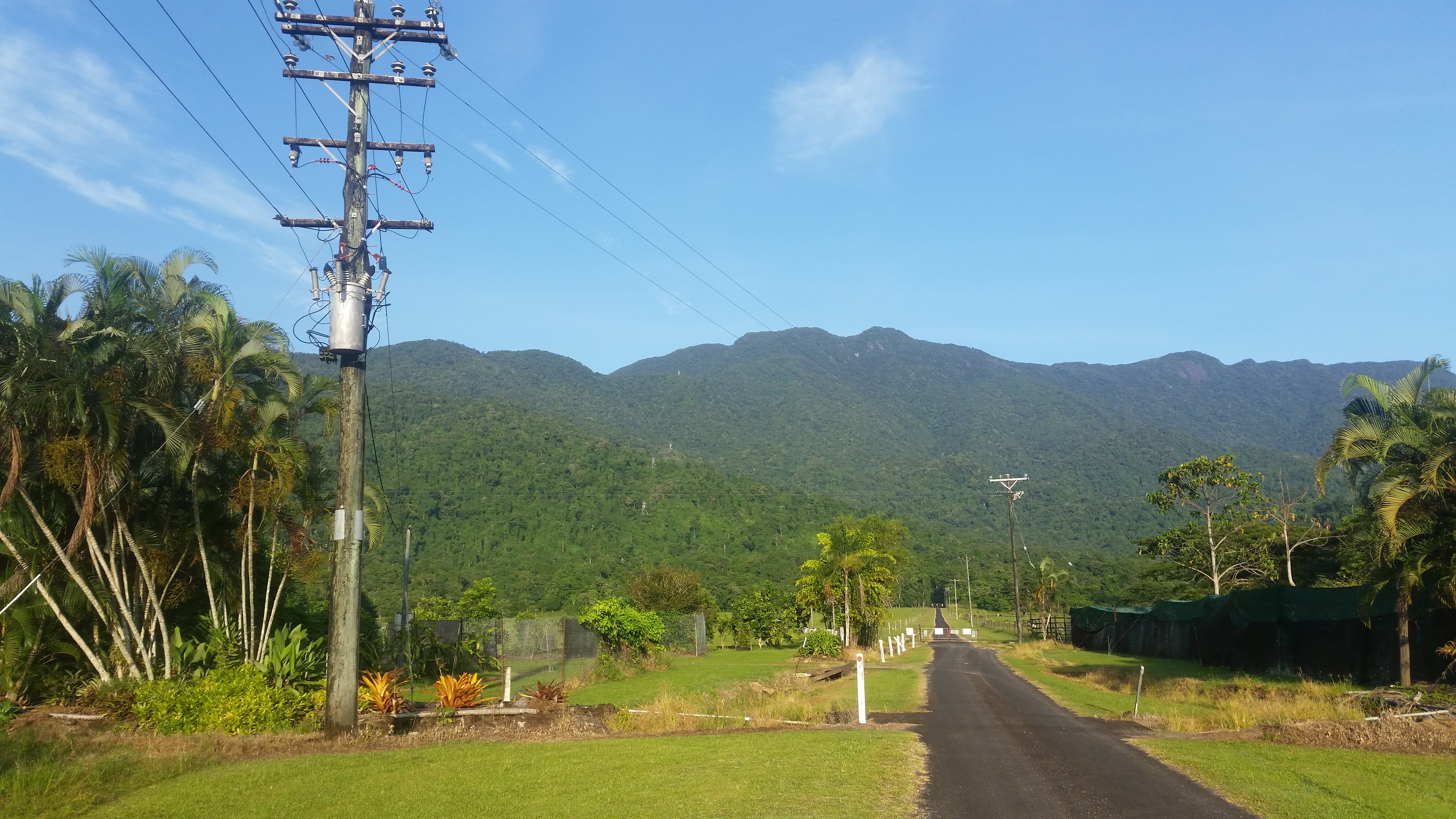
- Looking from Telecom Road in the locality of Bellenden Ker toward the mountain summit, 2018

- Interactive map of Bellenden Ker
- Coordinates: 17.2611°S 145.9252°E
- Country: Australia
- State: Queensland
- LGA: Cairns Region
- Location: 10.7 km (6.6 mi) N of Babinda; 26.7 km (16.6 mi) SE of Gordonvale; 49.6 km (30.8 mi) SSE of Cairns; 1,630 km (1,010 mi) NNE of Brisbane

Government
  - State electorate: Hill
  - Federal division: Kennedy

Area
  - Total: 31.9 km^{2} (12.3 sq mi)

Population
  - Total: 229 (2021 census)
  - Density: 7.179/km^{2} (18.59/sq mi)
- Time zone: UTC+10:00 (AEST)
- Postcode: 4871
Localities around Bellenden Ker
| Wooroonooran | Deeral | East Russell |
| Wooroonooran | Bellenden Ker | East Russell |
| Wooroonooran | Babinda | Babinda |

Bellenden Ker is a rural town and locality in the Cairns Region, Queensland, Australia. In the 2021 census, the locality of Bellenden Ker had a population of 229 people.

== Geography ==
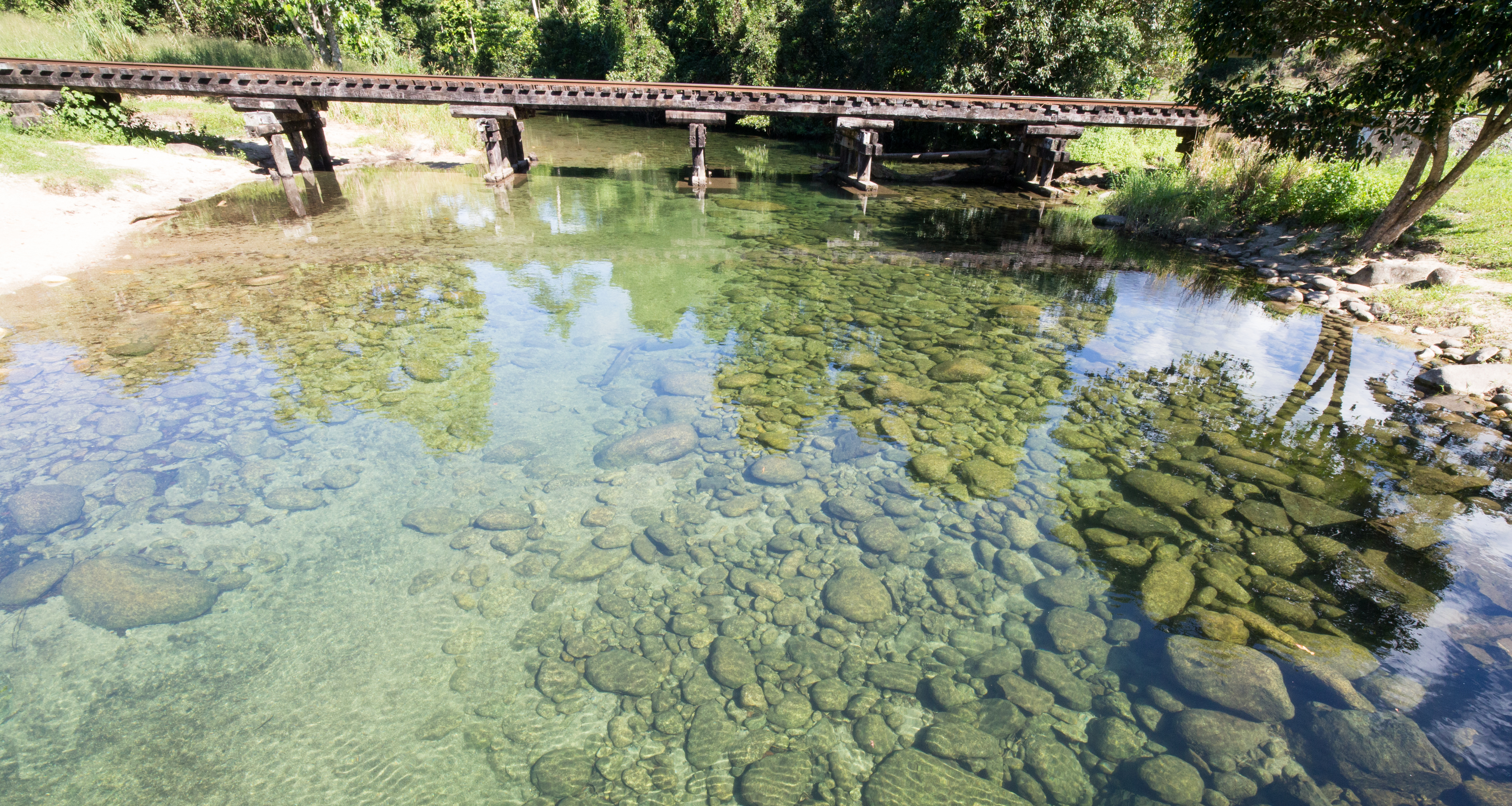
Looking along Harvey Creek towards the North Coast railway bridge at the Harvey Creek Scenic Reserve, 2014

The locality is bounded to the east by the Russell River and to the south by Frenchmans Creek (which becomes a tributary of the Russell River in the south-east of the locality). The locality is bounded to the west by the eastern extent of the Wooroonooran National Park. The Bellenden Ker Range runs through the national park where the three peaks of Mount Bellenden Ker are located (i.e. west of this locality which shares its name).

The Bruce Highway enters the locality from the south (Babinda) and exits to the north (Deeral). The North Coast railway also enters the locality from the south (Babinda) immediately east of the highway and also exits to the north (Deeral).

== History ==
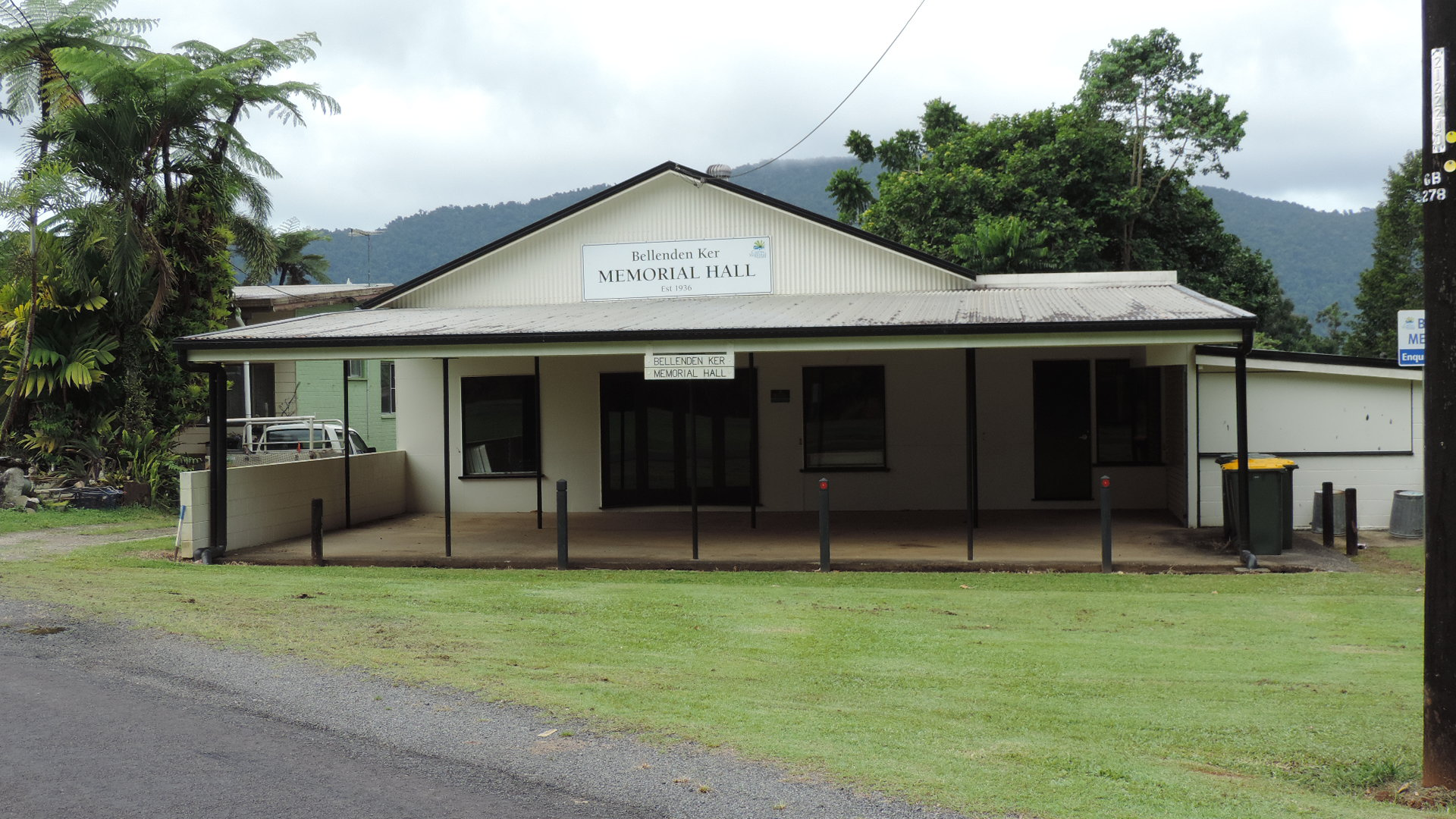
Bellenden Ker Memorial Hall, opened 1936

The town and locality take their names from the Bellenden Ker Range. The range in turn was named on 22 June 1819 by Lieutenant Phillip Parker King, the hydrographer on the HM Colonial Cutter Mermaid after botanist John Bellenden Ker at the suggestion of Allan Cunningham who was the botanist on board the Mermaid.

Bellenden Ker State School opened on 14 August 1922.

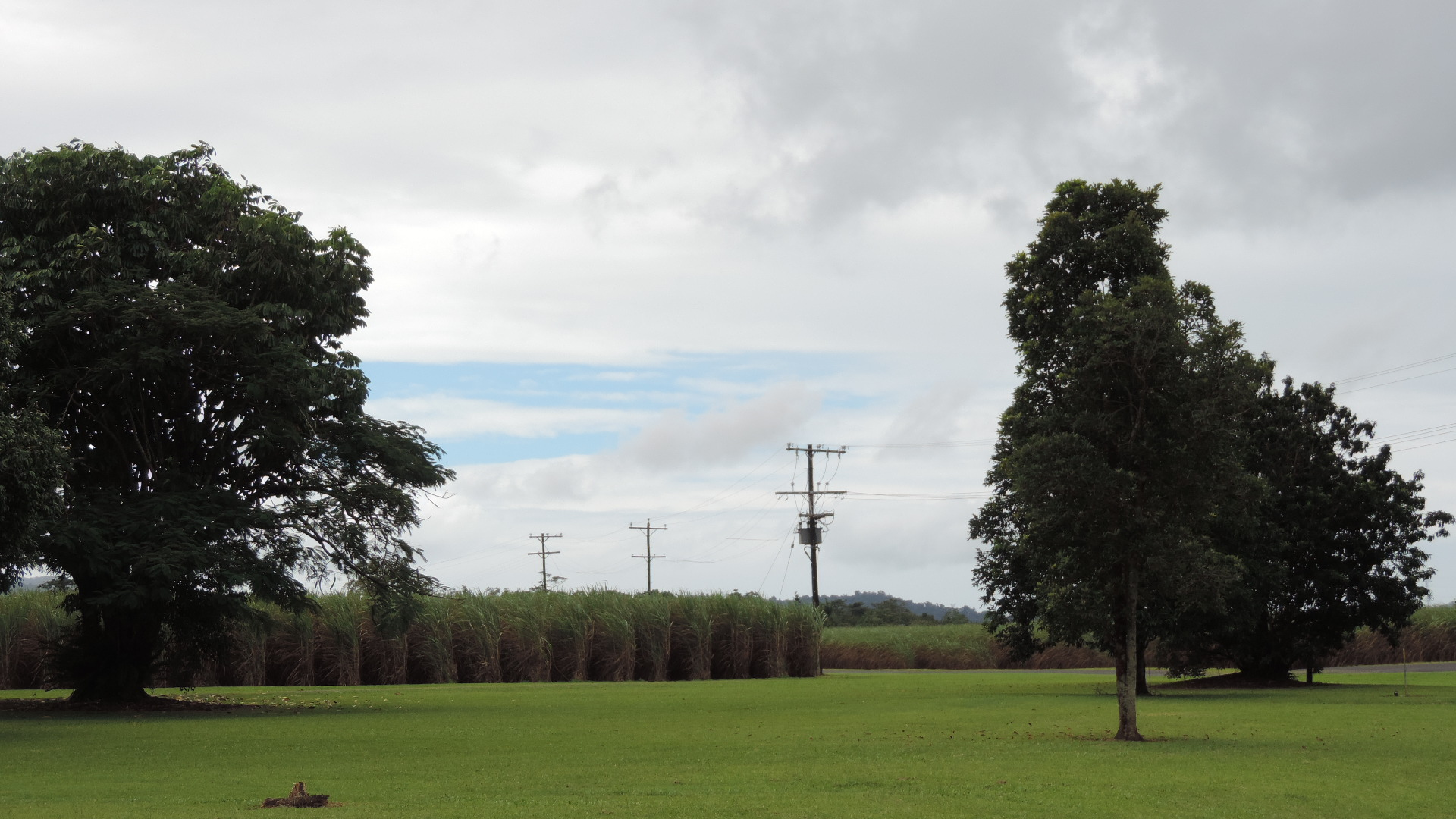
Sugar cane farming, Bellenden Ker, 2018

Bellenden Ker Post Office opened on 1 July 1936 and closed on 23 November 1974.

Bellenden Ker Memorial Hall opened on Saturday 5 December 1936 in the presence of over 300 people. The community had raised funds over a number of years to build the hall.

== Demographics ==
In the 2011 census, the locality of Bellenden Ker had a population of 475 people.

In the 2016 census, the locality of Bellenden Ker had a population of 252 people.

In the 2021 census, the locality of Bellenden Ker had a population of 229 people.

== Education ==
Bellenden Ker State School is a government primary (Prep-6) school for boys and girls at 77 Harvey Creek Road (17.2666°S 145.9251°E). In 2018, the school had an enrolment of 10 students with 2 teachers (1 full-time equivalent) and 4 non-teaching staff (1 full-time equivalent).

There are no secondary schools in Bellenden Ker. The nearest government secondary school is Babina State School in neighbouring Babinda to the south.

== Amenities ==
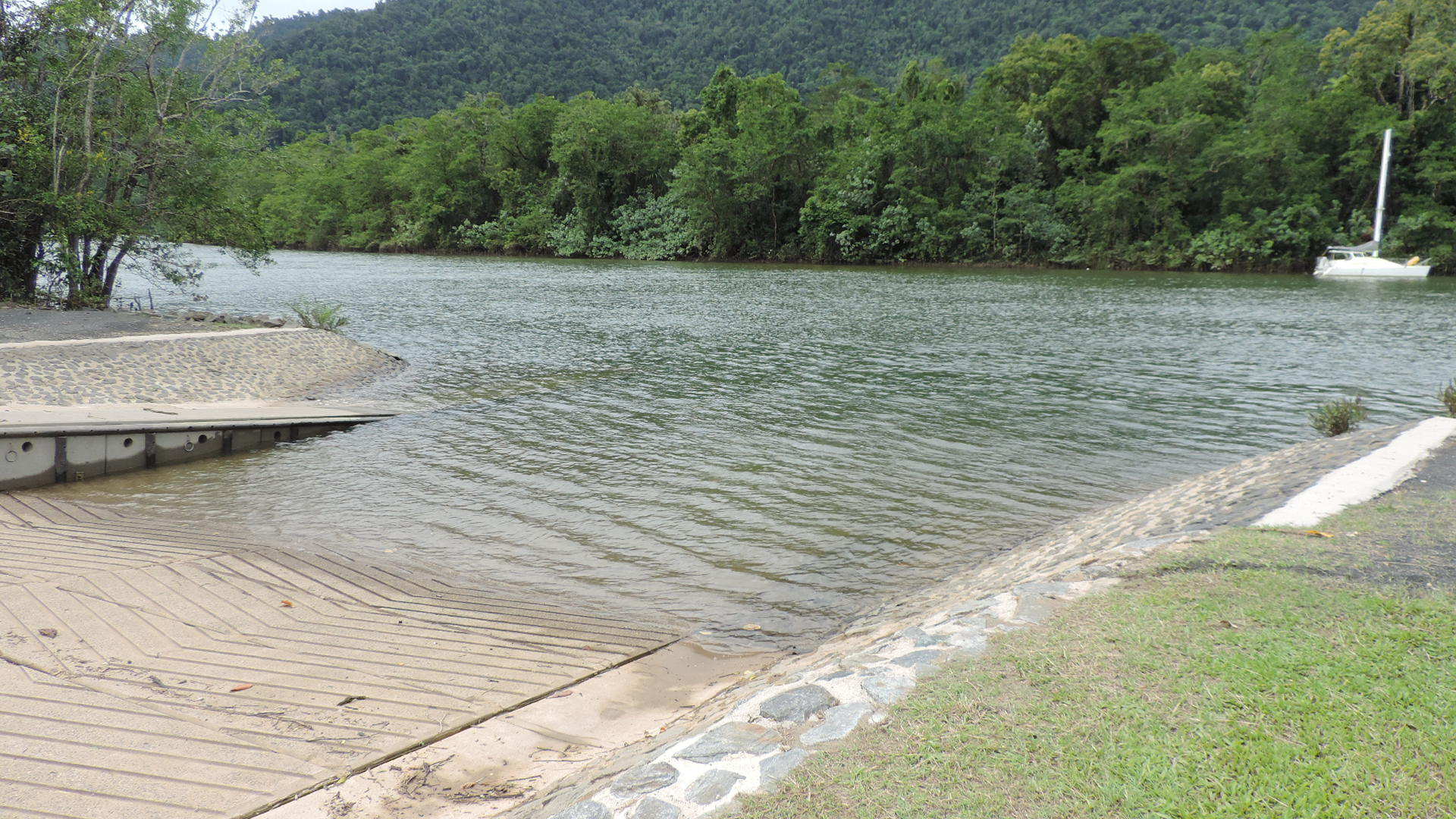
Boat ramp on Russell River Road, 2018

Bellenden Ker Memorial Hall is at 78 Harvey Creek Road (17.26722°S 145.92555°E).

There is a boat ramp with jetty on the Russell River Road on the north bank of the Russell River (17.2726°S 145.9484°E). It is managed by the Cairns Regional Council.
