= Mabel Island =

Island in Queensland, Australia

- Interactive map of Mabel Island

Geography
- Location: Northern Australia
- Coordinates: 17.210°S 146.078°E
- Area: 0.03 km^{2} (0.012 sq mi)

Administration
- Australia
- State: Queensland

Mabel Island in North Queensland, Australia is part of the Frankland Islands 30 km north-east of Babinda, and south-west of Cairns. It is around 3 hectares or 0.03 square km in size.

The Frankland Islands are teeming with permanent and migratory marine life, especially the green sea turtle which nests on the island. Normanby Island, part of the Frankland Islands group offers a comprehensive reef system with a tropical island.

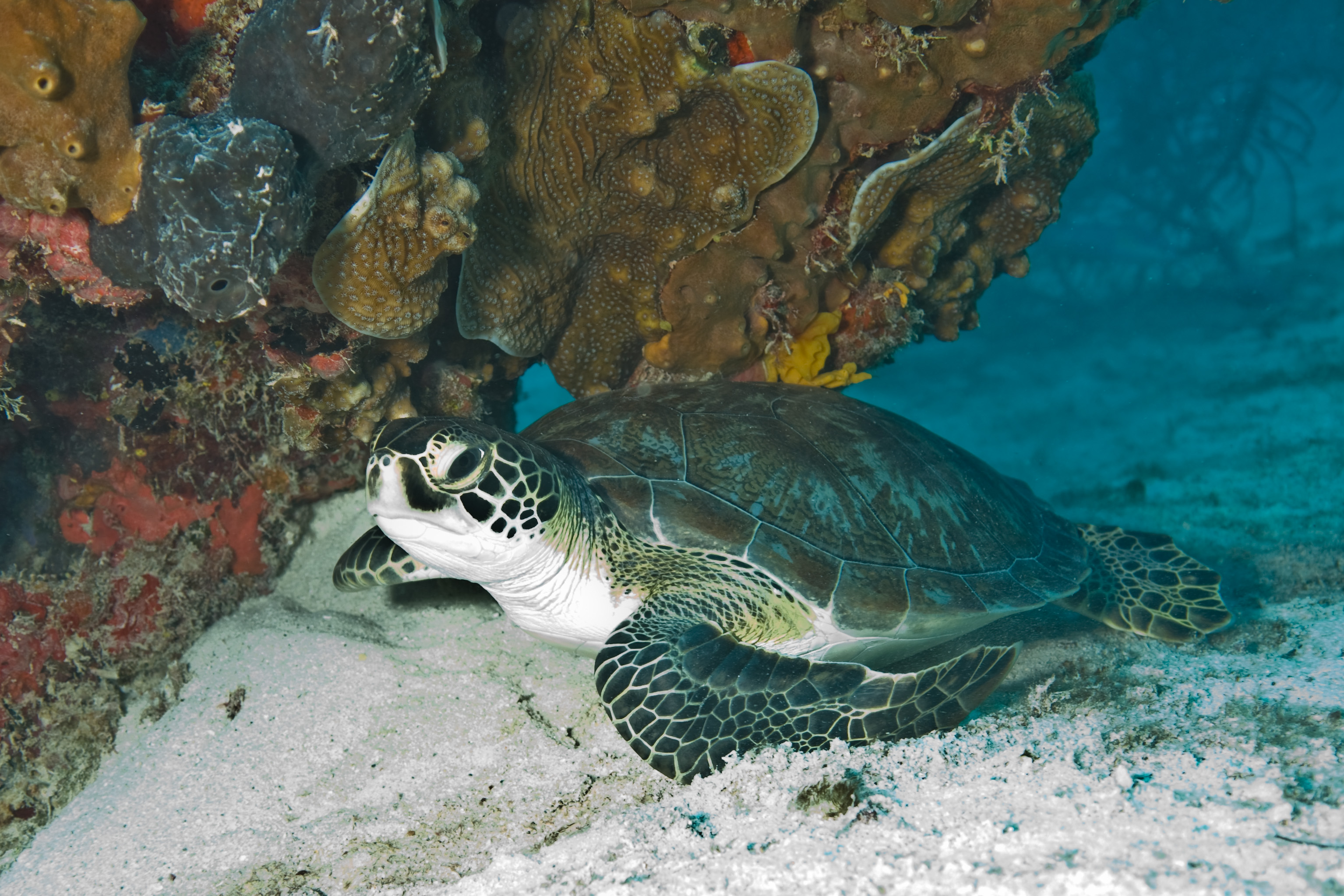
A green sea turtle (Chelonia mydas)

The islands are very popular with reef tour operators working from Cairns.
