= Round Island (Queensland) =

Part of Frankland Islands

- Interactive map of Round Island

Geography
- Location: Northern Australia
- Coordinates: 17.217°S 146.090°E
- Area: 0.04 km^{2} (0.015 sq mi)

Administration
- Australia
- State: Queensland

Round Island North Queensland is part of the Frankland Islands 30 km north-east of Babinda, and south-west of Cairns. It is around 4 hectares or 0.04 square km in size.

The Frankland Islands are teeming with permanent and migratory marine life, especially the green sea turtle which nests on the island. Normanby Island, part of the Frankland Islands group offers a comprehensive reef system with a tropical island.

The islands are very popular with reef tour operators working from Cairns.
