= Normanby Island (Queensland) =

Island in Queensland, Australia

- Interactive map of Normanby Island

Geography
- Location: Northern Australia
- Coordinates: 17.207°S 146.077°E
- Area: 0.07 km^{2} (0.027 sq mi)

Administration
- Australia
- State: Queensland

Normanby Island in north Queensland, Australia, is part of the Frankland Islands 30 km north-east of Babinda, and south-east of Cairns. The Frankland Islands are teeming with permanent and migratory marine life, especially the green sea turtle which nests on the island. Normanby Island, part of the Frankland Islands group offers a comprehensive reef system with a tropical island. The islands are very popular with reef tour operators working from Cairns. It is around 7 hectares or 0.07 square km in size.

== Australian Institute of Marine Science ==
Randomly located sites on the western sides of the Frankland Islands were surveyed early in 1995, and three sites with permanent markers were set up on the exposed eastern and the sheltered western faces in 1998. These sites were surveyed in January 1999, November 1999 and December 2001.

Sites on both faces of these islands were surveyed using fixed transects at the height of the bleaching in April 1998. Over 60% of the hard corals bleached. All coral groups except poritids were extensively bleached. Poritids were only slightly affected, with less than 10% of colonies bleaching. Coral death after bleaching led to significant reductions in the cover of all coral groups. Pocilloporids were most severely affected with almost 100% mortality, but even the cover of poritids declined slightly. Bleaching in 1998 reduced average hard coral cover on Frankland Is. fringing reefs from 67% to 37%. Reductions were similar on both the eastern and western reefs. Over 70% of soft corals (primarily Sinularia spp.) also bleached, but these apparently recovered and soft coral cover increased slightly between the 1998 and 1999 surveys. Eastern reefs were also affected by the crown-of-thorns starfish, Acanthaster planci (COTS) in 1998. Following the losses from bleaching and COTS, a few small pocilloporids recruits were recorded on both sides of the islands in December 2000.

== See also ==
- List of islands of Australia
