= Mighell, Queensland =

Mighell
- Suburb
- Interactive map of Mighell
- Coordinates: 17.5406°S 146.0167°E
- Country: Australia
- State: Queensland
- LGA: Cassowary Coast Region
- Location: 2.0 km (1.2 mi) S of Innisfail; 88.9 km (55.2 mi) S of Cairns; 258 km (160 mi) NNW of Townsville; 1,620 km (1,010 mi) NNW of Brisbane

Government
  - State electorate: Hill
  - Federal division: Kennedy

Area
  - Total: 4.3 km^{2} (1.7 sq mi)

Population
  - Total: 363 (2021 census)
  - Density: 84.4/km^{2} (218.6/sq mi)
- Time zone: UTC+10:00 (AEST)
- Postcode: 4860
Suburbs around Mighell
| Goondi Hill | Innisfail | East Innisfail |
| Bamboo Creek | Mighell | South Innisfail |
| Bamboo Creek | Mundoo | South Innisfail |

Mighell is a rural locality in the Cassowary Coast Region, Queensland, Australia. In the 2021 census, Mighell had a population of 363 people.

== Geography ==
The locality is bounded by the South Johnstone River to the east and by its tributary Bamboo Creek to the west and north.

The Bruce Highway enters the locality from the east (South Innisfail) crossing the South Johnstone River on the Centenary Bridge. Once in Mighell, the highway travels north along River Avenue, and then exits the locality to the north (Innisfail) crossing Bamboo Creek on an unnamed bridge.

The North Coast railway line enters the locality from the south (Mundoo) and exits to the north-west (Goondi Hill) crossing Bamboo Creek. There are no railway stations in the locality.

The land use is predominantly growing sugarcane and there is a network of cane tramways to transport the harvested sugarcane to the South Johnstone sugar mill in South Johnstone to the south. There is also grazing on native vegetation in the north-west of the locality.

The land use in the north and north-east of the locality is more suburban in character being an extension of the urban area of Innisfail to the north.

== History ==
The locality was named after Innisfail solicitor and businessman Norman Mighell.

Innisfail State High School opened on 24 January 1955 and operated until the end of 2009 at 2 Stitt Street (17.5367°S 146.0280°E). In 2010, it was amalgamated with the Innisfail Inclusive Education Centre (a special education facility) and Tropical North Queensland TAFE (Innisfail Campus) to form Innisfail State College using the site of the TAFE campus at Innisfail Estate. Innisfail State High School's website was archived.

== Demographics ==
In the 2016 census, Mighell had a population of 380 people.

In the 2021 census, Mighell had a population of 363 people.

== Education ==
There are no schools in Mighell. The nearest government primary schools are Innisfail State School in neighbouring Innisfail to the north and Mundoo State School in neighbouring Wangan to the south. The nearest government secondary school is Innisfail State College in Innisfail Estate to the north-east.

== Amenities ==
The Innisfail Conservatorium of Music (also known as the Con Theatre) is a performing arts centre at 5 River Avenue (17.5339°S 146.0304°E).

Innisfail Cultural Complex is a community centre off River Avenue (17.5337°S 146.0289°E).

Innisfail Cemetery is at 8 Scullen Avenue (17.5316°S 146.0276°E). It is operated by the Cassowary Coast Regional Council.
