= Basilisk, Queensland =

Basilisk
- Suburb
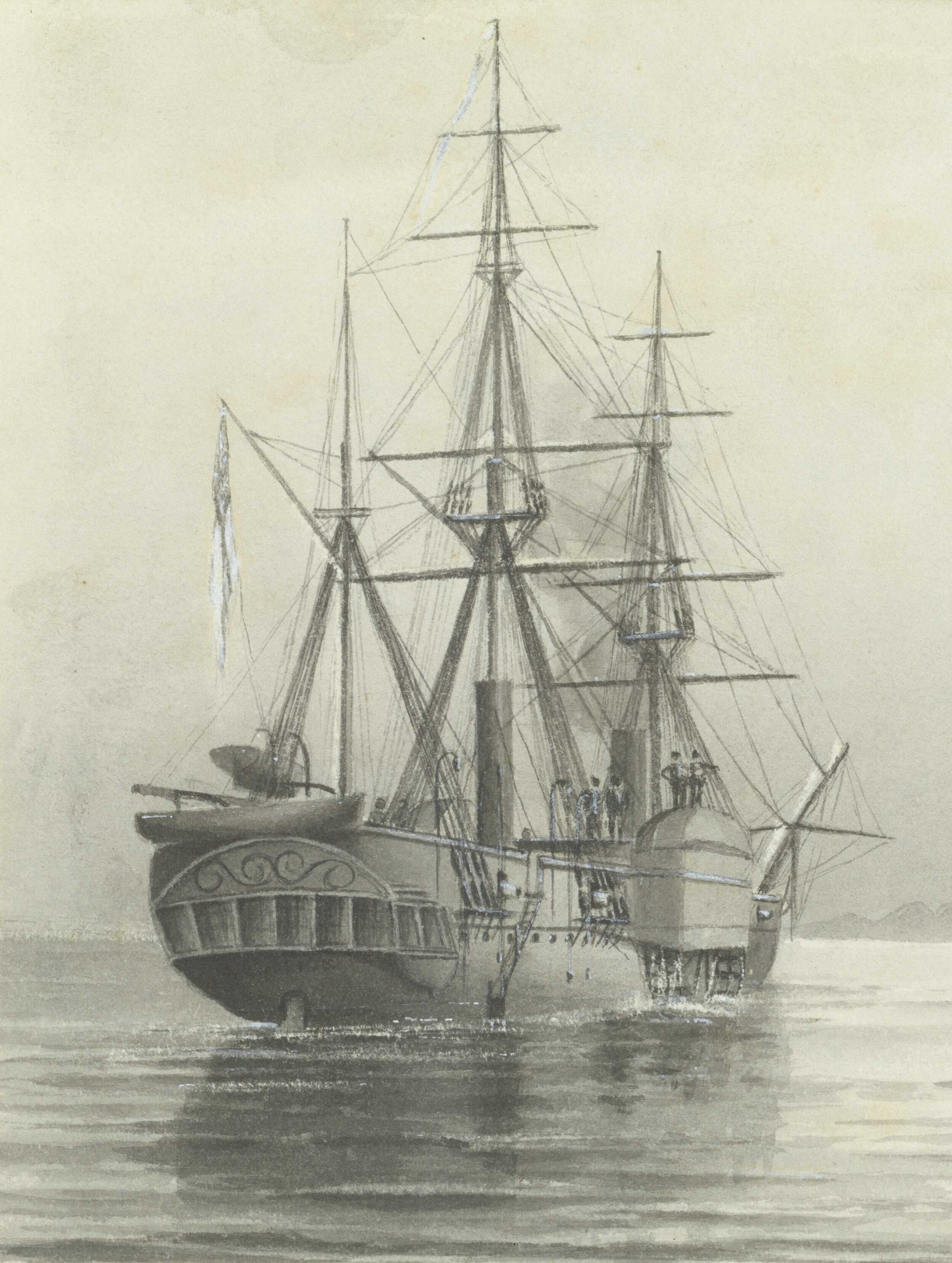
- HMS Basilisk, on the voyage from Brisbane to Cape York, 5 February 1871, after which the locality is named

- Interactive map of Basilisk
- Coordinates: 17.6708°S 145.9950°E
- Country: Australia
- State: Queensland
- LGA: Cassowary Coast Region
- Location: 16.5 km (10.3 mi) S of South Johnstone; 26.6 km (16.5 mi) S of Innisfail; 116 km (72 mi) S of Cairns; 255 km (158 mi) NNW of Townsville; 1,611 km (1,001 mi) NNW of Brisbane

Government
  - State electorate: Hinchinbrook
  - Federal division: Kennedy

Area
  - Total: 34.5 km^{2} (13.3 sq mi)

Population
  - Total: 0 (2021 census)
  - Density: 0.000/km^{2} (0.00/sq mi)
- Time zone: UTC+10:00 (AEST)
- Postcode: 4871
Suburbs around Basilisk
Mena Creek	Boogan; Camp Creek; Germantown	Moresby
Bombeeta	Basilisk	Warrubullen
Japoonvale; Walter Lever Estate	No 5 Branch; Warrubullen	Bombeeta

Basilisk is a rural locality in the Cassowary Coast Region, Queensland, Australia. In the 2021 census, Basilisk had "no people or a very low population".

== Geography ==
The locality is almost entirely composed of the Basilisk Range which rises from land close to sea level at the east to a series of unnamed peaks of from 200 to 400 metres. The central and southern area of the locality forms the Basilisk Range National Park. While the northern part of the locality is freehold land, it is mostly undeveloped. The land use in the west of the locality is grazing on native vegetation.

== History ==
The name Basilisk was the original name of the nearby town South Johnstone until 1954. The name comes from the Royal Navy ship HMS Basilisk which, under the command of Captain John Moresby, undertook hydrographic surveys off the coast in the early 1870s. The neighbouring locality of Moresby was named after the captain, while the nearby Mourilyan Harbour and related places are named after the ship's first lieutenant, Thomas Longley Mourilyan.

== Demographics ==
In the 2016 census, Basilisk had "no people or a very low population".

In the 2021 census, Basilisk had "no people or a very low population".

== Education ==
There are no schools in Basilisk. The nearest government primary schools are South Johnstone State School in South Johnstone to the north, Mourilyan State School in Mourilyan to the north-east, and Mena Creek State School in neighbouring Mena Creek to the west. The nearest government secondary school is Innisfail State College in Innisfail Estate to the north.

There are also non-government schools in South Johnstone and Innisfail's surburbs.
