= St Saviour's Anglican Church, South Johnstone =

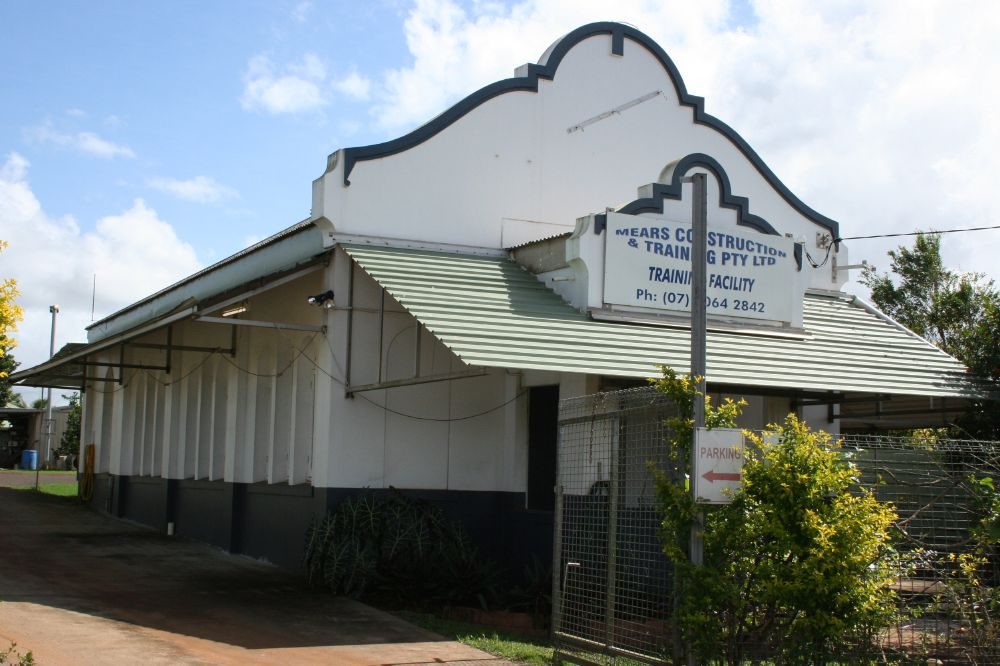
- St Saviour's Anglican Church, 2009

- Location within Queensland Location within Australia
- 17.5979°S 145.9949°E
- Location: 26 Hynes Street, South Johnstone, Cassowary Coast Region, Queensland, Australia

History
- Design period: 1919 - 1930s (interwar period)
- Built: 1938 - 1939

Site notes
- Architectural style: Spanish Mission

Queensland Heritage Register
- Official name: St Saviour's Anglican Church (former)
- Type: state heritage (built)
- Designated: 24 September 2004
- Reference no.: 602431
- Significant period: 1930s, 1960s (historical) ongoing (social)
- Significant components: views to, church, garden/grounds
- Builders: Mose Romano

St Saviour's Anglican Church is a heritage-listed former church building at 26 Hynes Street, South Johnstone, Cassowary Coast Region, Queensland, Australia. It was built from 1938 to 1939 by Mose Romano. It was added to the Queensland Heritage Register on 24 September 2004.

== History ==
St Saviour's Church in South Johnstone was completed in 1939 to serve Church of England (Anglican from 1981) parishioners at the southern end of the parish of Innisfail. Reputedly it was designed by Arthur Brown and constructed by local builder Mose Romano. Reverend John Feetham, Anglican Bishop of North Queensland, consecrated the church on Palm Sunday, 2 April 1939. It was used for Anglican religious service until 2003 and is currently privately owned.

South Johnstone is part of the Innisfail district (Innisfail was known as Geraldton until 1911). Thomas Henry Fitzgerald, who arrived on the banks of the Johnstone River to grow sugar cane on a 10,000 hectare land grant funded by the Roman Catholic Bishop of Brisbane and All Hallows' Sisters of Mercy, founded the port of Geraldton in 1880. Others arrived soon after and a community was soon established with an economy firmly based on sugar production. In 1882 a sugar mill was built at Mourilyan followed by the establishment of the South Johnstone Mill in 1916.

Sugar cane farming was labour-intensive, and as a result the region attracted a diverse racial mix of people including Pacific Islanders, Chinese, Italians, Malays, Japanese and Javanese. The prosperity of the sugar industry became dependent on the contract labour provided by Pacific Islanders in particular. The Chinese population, mainly failed miners from the Palmer River goldrush, established market gardens on the North and South Johnstone Rivers to supply goods for the workers in the sugar industry. The first Italian migrants arrived in North Queensland in December 1891 and were soon joined by friends and relatives to establish the strong Italian farming community that continues in the Innisfail region today.

The establishment of the South Johnstone Sugar Mill in 1916 provided the stimulus for the development of the town of South Johnstone. At the time of opening, 100 farmers supplied cane for the first crush, and by 1930 this had grown to 300 farms supplying cane to the South Johnstone Mill.

The First World War accentuated the decline of the western mineral fields of North Queensland, and a large population shift took place to the expanding coastal sugar production areas such as the Johnstone, Tully, Mackay, Cairns and Babinda areas where miners were reportedly in demand as preferred workers for the sugar mills and farms . Census information shows a steady increase in the population of Johnstone Shire from 1901 (population 2,924) to 1925 (population 8,000) and 1934–5 when the population was reported at 12,777. The population increase corresponds with a steady rise in sugar production in the Shire, particularly from 1924.

A cyclone in 1918 destroyed many buildings in the South Johnstone area, after which buildings were constructed of solid materials such as brick and concrete where possible. The Innisfail district, including South Johsntone, prospered in the 1920s due to the success of the local sugar industry. Sugar growing and milling also supported the area through the worldwide economic depression of the early 1930s. Many of the public and commercial buildings constructed in the area during the 1920s and 1930s, including St Savour's Church at South Johnstone, reflect the fashionable architectural and decorative styles of the interwar period, such as Mediterranean, Spanish Mission and "Art Deco".

The Bush Brotherhood of St Barnabas, an organisation of Anglican priests that had served the western mineral fields since its inception in Herberton in 1902, began to work in the developing coastal sugar areas after 1924 . Between 1926 and 1939 the Anglican Church, aided by the Bush Brotherhoods embarked on ambitious church building schemes in the developing sugar areas of North Queensland. Seven churches, including St Saviour's, were dedicated or consecrated during this time in coastal sugar towns such as Cairns, Tully, Innisfail, Mackay and South Johnstone .

The Brotherhood of St Barnabas was one of a group of Brotherhoods founded in 1896 to address the problems of providing pastoral care in the sparsely settled areas of Queensland. The Brothers were volunteers, recruited from England to work for five years in the developing colony of Queensland, travelling where they were needed, remaining unmarried for their time of service and receiving only board and lodging and an annual payment of £25 for personal items in return for their service in often difficult conditions .

South Johnstone Anglicans had been under the care of the priests serving the parishes of Cairns and Geraldton (later Innisfail), since the late 1890s. The first Church of England service in Geraldton was held in the Geraldton Division Board Hall in 1898, and was conducted by priests from the Parish of Cairns. In 1899 a timber church was constructed on the corner of Alice and Rankin Streets and a rectory was built on the corner of Alice and Owen Street in 1905. In 1900 the Parish of Geraldton was separated from the Parish of Cairns. The church was moved to a bigger site on Rankin Street in 1917, but this church, along with most of the town, was destroyed by the devastating cyclone of 1918. It was replaced by St Alban's church, on the corner of Rankin and Alice Streets, which was opened and dedicated on 5 October 1929.

Few Church of England rectors stayed longer than five years in the Parish of Innisfail and visiting priests such as the Bush Brotherhood were relied on heavily. From 1931 to 1933 members of the Bush Brotherhood of St Barnabas (Rev. HA Norton, Rev. EW Gribble and Rev. CG Brown) served the Parish, then members of the Bush Brotherhood of St Lawrence (Rev. NA Townsend, Rev. Ray Campbell and Rev. Underhill) took over the responsibility until 1938. Church records indicate that the building of St Saviour's Church was due to the efforts and enthusiasm of Brother Ray Campbell in particular .

On 22 October 1935 the Church of England purchased a 1,012 square metres (10,890 sq ft) block of land in South Johnstone for the erection of a daughter church to St Alban's. The site was purchased from Jose Maria for a cost of £65, and the concrete building was constructed in 1938–39 by Mose Romano at a cost of £1000. It is understood that the porch and vestry were added at a later date. The design, reputedly by Arthur Brown, was in Spanish Mission style.

The Bishop of North Queensland, Reverend John Olive Feetham, who ten years earlier had conducted a similar ceremony at St Alban's, dedicated St Saviour's Anglican Church on Palm Sunday, 2 April 1939. Half of the construction cost had been paid by this time. An active St Saviour's Ladies Guild subsequently raised funds through dances and other activities to help finance the remaining debt. Bequests also contributed to reduction of the debt.

Rev. EW Gribble returned as the incumbent rector in Innisfail parish from 1940 to 1945 after completing the required five years of voluntary service to the Brotherhood of St Barnabas.

St Saviour's provided a place of worship for Church of England parishioners at the southern end of the parish of Innisfail, with Holy Communion celebrated regularly on Sundays and weekdays. However, from the 1940s the population of South Johnstone began to decline. St Alban's Parish Notes of March 1946, records "notes from St Saviour's always seem to include accounts of farewell parties these days".

From the 1960s the building was shared as a place of worship by minority religions in the district. One parishioner remembers the Lutheran Church holding services (twice monthly) and Sunday school in St Saviour's for around 20 years from 1969. Pastor George Rosendale, from the Lutheran Mission of Hope Valley (now Hopevale), was one of the Ministers to serve the Lutheran congregation in South Johnstone. He was one of the first Aboriginal Lutheran pastors.

The Pew Bulletin in June 2003 noted the cost and on-going maintenance issues of parish properties and included an assessment of the Sunday ministry at St Saviour's. Because of these concerns the church was advertised for sale in July 2003 and subsequently was sold to a local business that currently uses the building as a training centre.

Internal furnishings, including the altar and pews, were removed when the church was sold in August 2003. Changes to the external fabric of the building, including removal of most of the front concrete fence, removal of the external crosses, removal and replacement of the front window architrave and the installation of air conditioning units, took place between the time of the sale and February 2004.

== Description ==
St Saviour's is a rendered masonry building with a corrugated iron roof. It is rectangular in plan with a separately-roofed front entrance porch and a northern rear vestry wing. It faces east onto Hynes Street, the main street of South Johnstone, and the symmetrically arranged facade, with its curved parapets to the front gable and front porch, and banks of windows with semi-circular arched fanlights, along the side elevations, makes an aesthetic contribution to the streetscape.

The front elevation has a six-paned timber framed casement window with semi-circular fanlight, either side of the centrally positioned front entrance porch, which is accessed from the north side via two concrete steps. The porch is enclosed with rendered masonry walls and has a flat corrugated iron roof concealed by a curved parapet, which mimics the front gable to the main building. There is a semi-circular arched window in the south wall of the porch, in-filled partly with glass and metal louvers and partly with a timber panel. The front wall of the porch until very recently had a grouped arched opening comprising three six-paned timber-framed casement windows with fanlights. The windows had been removed at the time of inspection, leaving a large open space in the wall with the central fanlight still in place. The porch gives access to the main entrance to the church, which consists of arched timber French doors.

The side walls extend 15 metres (49 ft) from the front to the rear of the building, with three grouped arched openings consisting of three six-paned timber-framed casement windows, the central window in each group being taller than the others, and one six-paned timber-framed casement window to the rear, on each side wall. There are two single six-paned timber-framed casement windows in the rear wall. All windows, other than the louvre window in the porch, have semi-circular fanlights and textured glass. There are five buttresses along each wall.

A vestry wing extends 4 metres (13 ft) out from the northern wall at the rear of the building. There is a timber door on the eastern side of the wing, facing the street, which permits external access to the vestry. The doorway has a trim consisting of a painted red arch with a red cross above the door, inside the arch. There are three concrete steps, painted red, leading up to the door.

Externally the building is painted white with red trim on the external windowsills, fascia and on the trim below the top of the parapet. Gutters are painted green.

Internally the walls are painted light green with white window frames and white ceilings. The floors of the nave, sanctuary and vestry are of concrete. There is an angled wood-panelled ceiling in the nave. Three overhead fans are suspended from the nave ceiling.

The sanctuary is separated from the nave by a small step, a timber partition that drops from the ceiling, and folding timber doors. An arched opening leads through the northern wall to the vestry. A bench with a sink and laminate cupboard are against one wall of the vestry. This furniture is not significant. The western end of the vestry has been enclosed for a toilet.

No original church furniture remains inside the building.

The grounds consist of lawn with a gravel access driveway along the southern side of the building. A concrete path leads from the building to the gate. Two gate posts and the two external posts from the original front concrete fence remain in place and have embossed crosses. The remainder of the front fence has been replaced with cyclone wire fencing and a new gate, retaining the view of the church from the street. Neither the wire elements of the front fence nor the new green Colourbond fence along the rear and side boundary of the block have heritage significance.

== Heritage listing ==
The former St Saviour's Anglican Church was listed on the Queensland Heritage Register on 24 September 2004 having satisfied the following criteria.

The place is important in demonstrating the evolution or pattern of Queensland's history.

St Saviour's Anglican Church, erected in 1938–39 to service the then expanding population of the Innisfail district, is important in demonstrating the pattern of settlement associated with the growth of North Queensland's sugar industry. In particular it illustrates how the growth of the North Queensland sugar industry during the interwar period generated prosperity in small communities such as South Johnstone, enabling parishioners to construct their places of worship in masonry rather than the more usual timber. It is important also as surviving evidence of the work of the priests of the Bush Brotherhoods of St Barnabas and St Lawrence, who served the Anglican parish of Innisfail from 1931 to 1938.

The place is important in demonstrating the principal characteristics of a particular class of cultural places.

The substantial, rendered masonry church in the Spanish Mission style remains largely intact. It is important in demonstrating the principal characteristics of its type, and is illustrative of its era.

The place has a special association with the life or work of a particular person, group or organisation of importance in Queensland's history.

As a rare and surviving church building constructed by the Bush Brotherhood of St Barnabas and St Lawrence, the former St Saviour's Anglican Church, South Johnstone, has a special association with the work of the Bush Brotherhood, who were important in the Anglican Church's (Church of England) presence in remote areas of Queensland.
