= Camp Creek, Queensland =

Camp Creek
- Suburb
- Interactive map of Camp Creek
- Coordinates: 17.6183°S 145.9561°E
- Country: Australia
- State: Queensland
- LGA: Cassowary Coast Region
- Location: 7.3 km (4.5 mi) SW of South Johnstone; 17.1 km (10.6 mi) SW of Innisfail; 108 km (67 mi) S of Cairns; 260 km (160 mi) NNW of Townsville; 1,618 km (1,005 mi) NNW of Brisbane

Government
  - State electorate: Hill
  - Federal division: Kennedy

Area
  - Total: 19.8 km^{2} (7.6 sq mi)

Population
  - Total: 128 (2021 census)
  - Density: 6.46/km^{2} (16.74/sq mi)
- Time zone: UTC+10:00 (AEST)
- Postcode: 4871
Suburbs around Camp Creek
Utchee Creek	No. 6 Branch	South Johnstone; Boogan
Utchee Creek	Camp Creek	Basilisk
Utchee Creek	Germantown	Basilisk

Camp Creek is a rural locality in the Cassowary Coast Region, Queensland, Australia. In the 2021 census, Camp Creek had a population of 128 people.

== Demographics ==
In the 2016 census, Camp Creek had a population of 186 people.

In the 2021 census, Camp Creek had a population of 128 people.

== Education ==
There are no schools in Camp Creek. The nearest government primary schools are Mena Creek State School in Mena Creek to the south and South Johnstone State School in neighbouring South Johnstone to the north-east. The nearest government secondary school is Innisfail State College in Innisfail Estate to the north-east.
