= No. 6 Branch, Queensland =

No. 6 Branch
- Suburb
- Interactive map of No. 6 Branch
- Coordinates: 17.5947°S 145.9486°E
- Country: Australia
- State: Queensland
- LGA: Cassowary Coast Region
- Location: 15.9 km (9.9 mi) SE of Innisfail; 106 km (66 mi) S of Cairns; 258 km (160 mi) NNW of Townsville; 1,589 km (987 mi) NNW of Brisbane

Government
  - State electorate: Hill
  - Federal division: Kennedy

Area
  - Total: 15.3 km^{2} (5.9 sq mi)

Population
  - Total: 73 (2021 census)
  - Density: 4.77/km^{2} (12.36/sq mi)
- Time zone: UTC+10:00 (AEST)
- Postcode: 4859
Suburbs around No. 6 Branch
Coorumba	Pin Gin	Currajah
Mamu	No. 6 Branch	South Johnstone
Utchee Creek	Camp Creek	Camp Creek

No. 6 Branch is a rural locality in the Cassowary Coast Region, Queensland, Australia. In the 2021 census, No. 6 Branch had a population of 73 people.

== Geography ==
The locality is bounded by the South Johnstone River to the west, north-west, and north, but then the river flows south through the locality and then forms part of the southern boundary.

The land in the locality varies in elevation from 10 to 170 metres (33 to 558 ft).

Sugarcane is grown in the flatter land in the north and east of the locality around the South Johnstone River and also in the south of the locality around Mundiburra Creek. The sugarcane from the east of the locality is transported by a cane tramway to the South Johnstone Sugar Mill in South Johnstone.

In other areas, the predominant land use is grazing on native vegetation.

== Demographics ==
In the 2016 census, No. 6 Branch had a population of 50 people.

In the 2021 census, No. 6 Branch had a population of 73 people.

== Education ==
There are no schools in No. 6 Branch. The nearest government primary schools are South Johnstone State School in neighbouring South Johnstone to the east and Mundoo State School in Wangan to the north-east. The nearest government secondary school is Innisfail State College in Innisfail Estate to the north-east.
