= New Harbourline =

- Suburb
- Interactive map of New Harbourline
- Coordinates: 17.6241°S 146.0647°E
- Country: Australia
- State: Queensland
- LGA: Cassowary Coast Region
- Location: 12.8 km (8.0 mi) S of Innisfail; 100 km (62 mi) S of Cairns; 252 km (157 mi) NNW of Townsville; 1,613 km (1,002 mi) NNW of Brisbane

Government
  - State electorate: Hill
  - Federal division: Kennedy

Area
  - Total: 15.4 km^{2} (5.9 sq mi)

Population
  - Total: 218 (2021 census)
  - Density: 14.16/km^{2} (36.66/sq mi)
- Time zone: UTC+10:00 (AEST)
- Postcode: 4858
Suburbs around New Harbourline
Mourilyan	Mourilyan	Mourilyan Harbour
Martyville	New Harbourline	Mourilyan Harbour
Moresby	Moresby	Cowley Beach

New Harbourline is a rural locality in the Cassowary Coast Region, Queensland, Australia. In the 2021 census, New Harbourline had a population of 218 people.

== Geography ==
The locality is bounded to the south by the Moresby River.

The land is flat and low-lying (just above sea level). The land use is predominantly growing sugarcane. There is some rural residential housing in the north-west of the locality.

The main road through the locality is New Harbourline Road and there are some cane tramways in the locality to transport the harvested sugarcane to the South Johnstone sugar mill.

== History ==
North East Harbour Line State School opened on 3 February 1936. It closed in December 1941. The school was located on the northern side of New Harbourline Road (approx 17.6139°S 146.0611°E).

== Demographics ==
In the 2016 census, New Harbourline had a population of 198 people.

In the 2021 census, New Harbourline had a population of 218 people.

== Education ==
There are no schools in Harbourline. The nearest government primary school is Mourilyan State School in neighbouring Mourilyan to the north-west. The nearest government secondary school is Innisfail State College in Innisfail Estate to the north.
