= Japoonvale =

- Suburb
- Interactive map of Japoonvale
- Coordinates: 17.7283°S 145.9085°E
- Country: Australia
- State: Queensland
- LGA: Cassowary Coast Region
- Location: 28.8 km (17.9 mi) SW of Innisfail; 37.9 km (23.5 mi) N of Tully; 118 km (73 mi) S of Cairns; 244 km (152 mi) NW of Townsville; 1,575 km (979 mi) NNW of Brisbane

Government
  - State electorate: Hill
  - Federal division: Kennedy

Area
  - Total: 36.0 km^{2} (13.9 sq mi)

Population
  - Total: 107 (2021 census)
  - Density: 2.972/km^{2} (7.70/sq mi)
- Time zone: UTC+10:00 (AEST)
- Postcode: 4856
Suburbs around Japoonvale
Mamu	Mamu	Bombeeta; Basilisk
Mamu	Japoonvale	Walter Lever Estate
Gulngai	Gulngai	No 4 Branch

Japoonvale is a rural locality in the Cassowary Coast Region, Queensland, Australia. In the 2021 census, Japoonvale had a population of 107 people.

The town of Japoon is in the north-east of the locality (17.7177°S 145.9394°E).

== History ==
The town was named by surveyor W.J. Callendar and is an Aboriginal word meaning eels.

Stratvell State School opened on 2 August 1916 and closed on 31 December 2002. The school was located at 34 Stratvell Road (17.7239°S 145.9221°E).

Japoon West State School opened on 14 April 1925 and closed on 1 June 1927. The school building was relocated to Euramo.

== Demographics ==
In the 2016 census, Japoonvale had a population of 141 people.

In the 2021 census, Japoonvale had a population of 107 people.

== Education ==
There are no schools in Japoonvale. The nearest government primary schools are Silkwood State School in Silkwood to the east and Mena Creek State School in Mena Creek to the north. The nearest government secondary school are Innisfail State College in Innisfail Estate to the north-east and Tully State High School in Tully to the south.
