= Germantown, Queensland =

Germantown
- Suburb
- Interactive map of Germantown
- Coordinates: 17.6438°S 145.9661°E
- Country: Australia
- State: Queensland
- LGA: Cassowary Coast Region
- Location: 17.0 km (10.6 mi) SW of Innisfail; 103 km (64 mi) S of Cairns; 256 km (159 mi) NNW of Townsville; 1,619 km (1,006 mi) NNW of Brisbane

Government
  - State electorate: Hill
  - Federal division: Kennedy

Area
  - Total: 6.3 km^{2} (2.4 sq mi)

Population
  - Total: 52 (2021 census)
  - Density: 8.25/km^{2} (21.4/sq mi)
- Time zone: UTC+10:00 (AEST)
- Postcode: 4871
Suburbs around Germantown
Camp Creek	Camp Creek	Basilisk
Utchee Creek	Germantown	Basilisk
Mena Creek	Mena Creek	Basilisk

Germantown is a rural locality in the Cassowary Coast Region, Queensland, Australia. In the 2021 census, Germantown had a population of 52 people.

== Geography ==
The locality is bounded to the north-west by Utchee Creek, to the north by Camp Creek Road, to the east by Stewart Creek, and to the south by the watercourse Mena Creek.

The Innisfail Japoon Road enters the locality from the north (the locality Camp Creek) and exits to the south-west (the locality Mena Creek).

The land use is agricultural, a mix of crop growing (with sugarcane being widely grown) and grazing on native vegetation. There is a cane tramway network through the locality to transport the harvested sugarcane to the South Johnstone sugar mill.

== History ==
After the First World War, many German settlers settled here (hence the place name). It was mainly a sugar cane farming community until the early 2010s, at which time a large portion of Germantown was converted from sugar cane into open cattle country. Another portion of Germantown was recently converted into a Banana farm.

== Demographics ==
In the 2016 census, Germantown had a population of 64 people.

In the 2021 census, Germantown had a population of 52 people.

== Education ==
There are no schools in Germantown. The nearest government primary school is Mena Creek State School in neighbouring Mena Creek to the south. The nearest government secondary school is Innisfail State College in Innisfail Estate to the north-east.
