= Bombeeta, Queensland =

Bombeeta
- Suburb
- Interactive map of Bombeeta
- Coordinates: 17.6930°S 145.9613°E
- Country: Australia
- State: Queensland
- LGA: Cassowary Coast Region
- Location: 21.7 km (13.5 mi) SE of Innisfail; 111 km (69 mi) S of Cairns; 251 km (156 mi) NNW of Townsville; 1,583 km (984 mi) NNW of Brisbane

Government
  - State electorate: Hill
  - Federal division: Kennedy

Area
  - Total: 18.0 km^{2} (6.9 sq mi)

Population
  - Total: 147 (2021 census)
  - Density: 8.17/km^{2} (21.15/sq mi)
- Time zone: UTC+10:00 (AEST)
- Postcode: 4871
Suburbs around Bombeeta
Mena Creek	Mena Creek	Basilisk
Mamu	Bombeeta	Basilisk
Japoonvale	Japoonvale	Basilisk

Bombeeta is a rural locality in the Cassowary Coast Region, Queensland, Australia. In the 2021 census, Bombeeta had a population of 147 people.

== History ==
Bombeeta State School opened on 7 March 1922. It closed in 1939. It was located at the Eight Mile Siding on the Japoon Tramline via Innisfail.

== Demographics ==
In the 2016 census, Bombeeta had a population of 136 people.

In the 2021 census, Bombeeta had a population of 147 people.

== Education ==
There are no schools in Bombeeta. The nearest government primary school is Mena Creek State School in neighbouring Mena Creek to the north. The nearest government secondary school is Innisfail State College in Innisfail Estate to the north-east.
