= Etty Bay, Queensland =

Etty Bay
- Town
- Interactive map of Etty Bay
- Coordinates: 17.5569°S 146.0886°E
- Country: Australia
- State: Queensland
- LGA: Cassowary Coast Region
- Location: 11.8 km (7.3 mi) SSE of Innisfail; 99.3 km (61.7 mi) SSE of Cairns; 256 km (159 mi) NNW of Townsville; 1,587 km (986 mi) NNW of Brisbane

Government
  - State electorate: Hill
  - Federal division: Kennedy

Area
  - Total: 14.2 km^{2} (5.5 sq mi)

Population
  - Total: 486 (2021 census)
  - Density: 34.23/km^{2} (88.6/sq mi)
- Time zone: UTC+10:00 (AEST)
- Postcode: 4858
Localities around Etty Bay
Mourilyan	Coquette Point	Coral Sea
Mourilyan	Etty Bay	Coral Sea
Mourilyan	Mourilyan	Mourilyan Harbour

Etty Bay is a coastal town and a locality in the Cassowary Coast Region, Queensland, Australia. In the 2021 census, the locality of Etty Bay had a population of 486 people.

== Attractions ==
Etty Bay is a popular beach for locals and tourists. It features a swimming net to protect from the seasonal Jelly Fish. Etty bay also has a prominent cassowary population that can be regularly seen on the beach.

== Demographics ==
In the 2016 census, the locality of Etty Bay had a population of 397 people.

In the 2021 census, the locality of Etty Bay had a population of 486 people.

== Education ==
There are no schools in Etty Bay. The nearest government primary school is Mourilyan State School in neighbouring Mourilyan to the south-west. The nearest government secondary school is Innisfail State College is Innisfail Estate, Innisfail, to the north-west.
