= Martyville, Queensland =

Martyville
- Suburb
- Interactive map of Martyville
- Coordinates: 17.615°S 146.0369°E
- Country: Australia
- State: Queensland
- LGA: Cassowary Coast Region
- Location: 12.3 km (7.6 mi) S of Innisfail; 99.8 km (62.0 mi) S of Cairns; 248 km (154 mi) NNW of Townsville; 1,595 km (991 mi) NNW of Brisbane

Government
  - State electorate: Hill
  - Federal division: Kennedy

Area
  - Total: 4.3 km^{2} (1.7 sq mi)

Population
  - Total: 116 (2021 census)
  - Density: 27.0/km^{2} (69.9/sq mi)
- Time zone: UTC+10:00 (AEST)
- Postcode: 4858
Suburbs around Martyville
Boogan	Mourilyan	New Harbourline
Boogan	Martyville	New Harbourline
Moresby	New Harbourline	New Harbourline

Martyville is a rural locality in the Cassowary Coast Region, Queensland, Australia. In the 2021 census, Martyville had a population of 116 people.

== Geography ==
The locality is bounded to the west (in part) by the Bruce Highway and to east (in part) by Flynn Road. Martyville Road is a curved road which begins and ends at the Bruce Highway passing through the locality. The Moresby River enters the locality from the west (Boogan) and flows east across the locality and then forms a small part of the south-east boundary of the locality before exiting to the south-east (Moresby / New Harbourline).

The land is relatively flat and low-lying being approxinately 5 metres (16 ft) above sea level. The predominant land use is crop growing with both sugarcane and bananas in the northern and western parts of the locality. There is grazing on native vegetation in the west of the locality.

Martyville Aquaculture Farm is in the south of the locality and raises saltwater barramundi. It has 16.6 hectares (41 acres) of aerated ponds and can produce 460 tonnes of fish annually.

== Demographics ==
In the 2016 census, Martyville had a population of 119 people.

In the 2021 census, Martyville had a population of 116 people.

== Education ==
There are no schools in Martyville. The nearest government primary school are Mourilyan State School in neighbouring Mourilyan to the north. The nearest government secondary school is Innisfail State College in Innisfail Estate to the north.
