= Mamu, Queensland =

Mamu
- Suburb
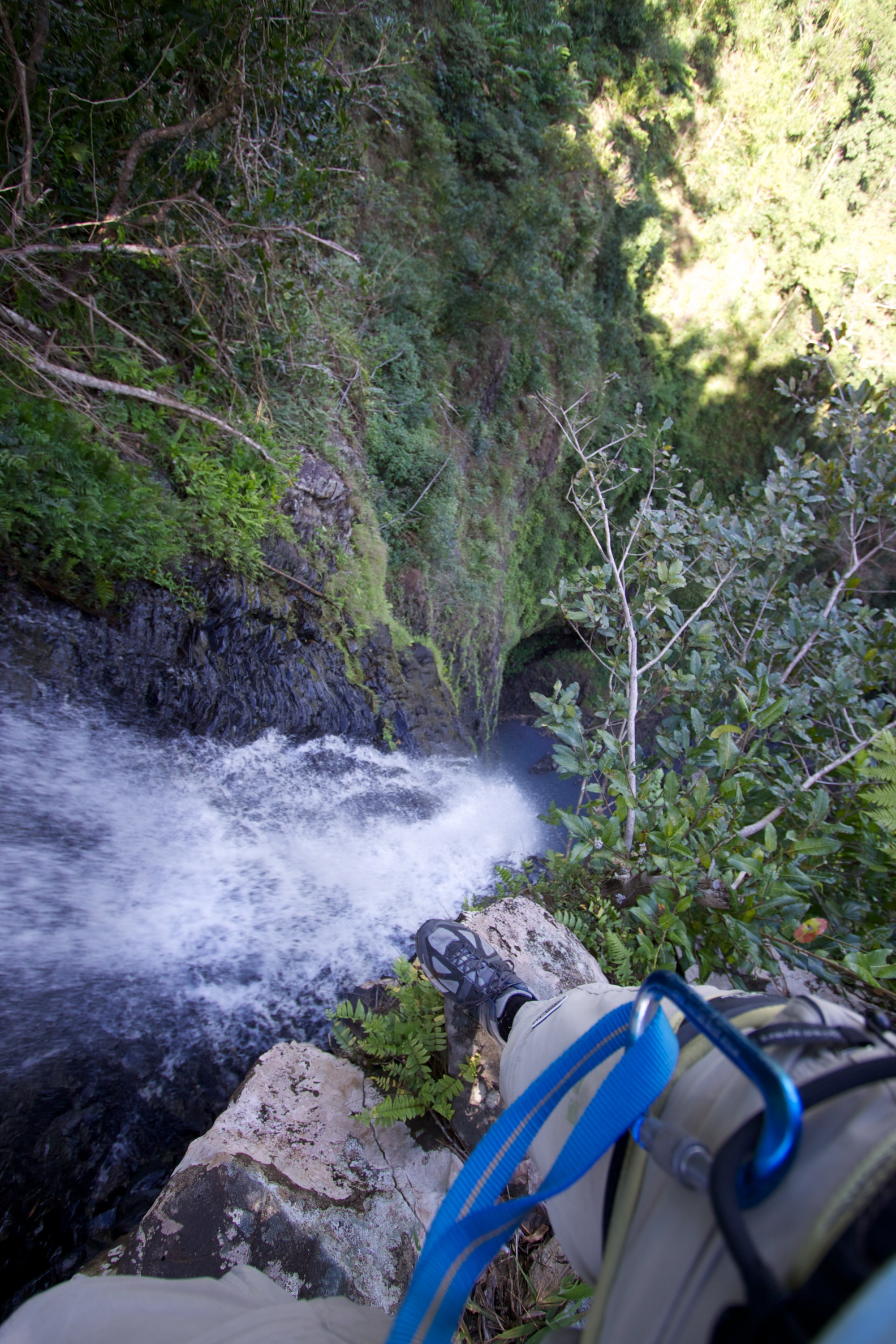
- Cowley Falls

- Interactive map of Mamu
- Coordinates: 17.6611°S 145.8219°E
- Country: Australia
- State: Queensland
- LGA: Cassowary Coast Region
- Location: 37 km (23 mi) SW of Innisfail; 127 km (79 mi) S of Cairns; 272 km (169 mi) NNW of Townsville; 1,628 km (1,012 mi) NNW of Brisbane

Government
  - State electorate: Hill
  - Federal division: Kennedy

Area
  - Total: 185.9 km^{2} (71.8 sq mi)
- Elevation: 130–820 m (430–2,690 ft)

Population
  - Total: 0 (2021 census)
  - Density: 0.0000/km^{2} (0.000/sq mi)
- Time zone: UTC+10:00 (AEST)
- Postcode: 4871
Suburbs around Mamu
Wooroonooran	East Palmerston	Coorumba; No 6 Branch
Palmerston	Mamu	Utchee Creek; Mena Creek
Gulngai	Gulngai	Bombeeta; Japoonvale

Mamu is a rural locality in the Cassowary Coast Region, Queensland, Australia. In the 2021 census, Mamu had "no people or a very low population". Mamu’s postcode is 4871.

== Geography ==
The locality lies completely within three protected areas. The western part of the locality is within the Wooroonooran National Park which extends into neighbouring localities of Wooroonooran, Palmerston and Gulngai. The eastern part of the locality is within the Japoon National Park and Japoon State Forest. The Japoon National Park extends into neighbouring Mena Creek and Gulngai.

The terrain within the locality is mountainous, ranging from 130 to 820 metres (430 to 2,690 ft) above sea level with one named peak:

- Mount Utchee (17.6436°S 145.8828°E) at 531 metres (1,742 ft)

Beehive Island is a 2.05-hectare (5.1-acre) island in the South Johnstone River (17.5884°S 145.9064°E) which extends into neighbouring Coorumba.

== Demographics ==
In the 2016 census, Mamu had "no people or a very low population".

In the 2021 census, Mamu had "no people or a very low population".

== Attractions ==
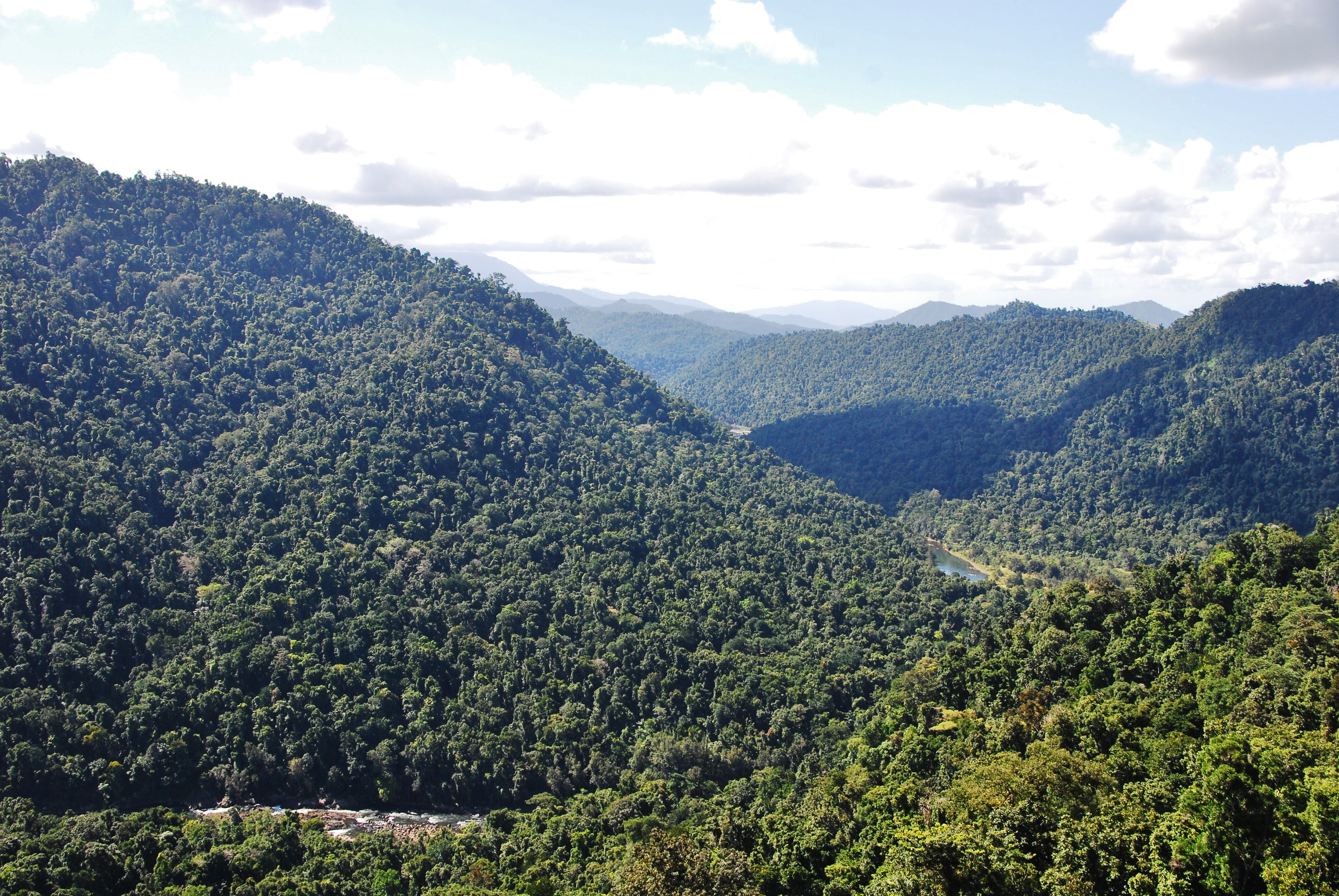
View from the Mamu Tropical Skywalk of the rainforest and Johnstone River, 2017

There are two lookouts:

- Crawfords Lookout (17.6166°S 145.8°E), named after Vic Crawford
- McNamee Lookout (17.7166°S 145.8166°E)

Despite the name, the Mamu Rainforest Tropical Skywalk is actually just outside of the locality in neighbouring Wooroonooran (17.6129°S 145.7979°E). It is on the Palmerston Highway not far from Crawfords Lookout.

There are two waterfalls. Binda Falls is on the South Johnstone River (17.6363°S 145.7725°E). Cowley Falls on Mitcha Creek (17.6302°S 145.8061°E) and are named after Ebenezer Cowley, the horticulturalist and overseer of the Kamerunga State Nursery. Cowley Falls can be reached by a 2.6-kilometre (1.6 mi) track from the Palmerston Highway (17.62605°S 145.81209°E).
