= Currajah, Queensland =

Currajah
- Suburb
- Interactive map of Currajah
- Coordinates: 17.5786°S 145.985°E
- Country: Australia
- State: Queensland
- LGA: Cassowary Coast Region
- Location: 10.5 km (6.5 mi) SW of Innisfail; 94.9 km (59.0 mi) S of Cairns; 258 km (160 mi) NNW of Townsville; 1,619 km (1,006 mi) NNW of Brisbane

Government
  - State electorate: Hill
  - Federal division: Kennedy

Area
  - Total: 8.9 km^{2} (3.4 sq mi)

Population
  - Total: 57 (2021 census)
  - Density: 6.40/km^{2} (16.59/sq mi)
- Time zone: UTC+10:00 (AEST)
- Postcode: 4871
Suburbs around Currajah
Bamboo Creek	Bamboo Creek	Wangan
Pin Gin Hill	Currajah	Stockton
No 6 Branch	South Johnstone	Boogan

Currajah is a rural locality in the Cassowary Coast Region, Queensland, Australia. In the 2021 census, Currajah had a population of 57 people.

== Geography ==
The locality is bounded to the east by the North Coast railway line, entering from the south-west (Boogan) and existing to the north-west (Wangan).

The land use is a mixture of crop growing and grazing on native vegetation. Sugarcane is a major crop in the locality. There is a network of cane tramways through the locality to transport the sugarcane to the South Johnstone sugar mill in neighbouring South Johnstone to the south.

== History ==
The locality takes its name from a tramway station (later a railway station) and is an Aboriginal word meaning running water.

== Demographics ==
In the 2016 census, Currajah had a population of 60 people.

In the 2021 census, Currajah had a population of 57 people.

== Education ==
There are no schools in Currajah. The nearest government primary schools are Mundoo State School in neighbouring Wangan to the north-east and South Johnstone State School in South Johnstone to the south. The nearest government secondary school is Innisfail State College in Innisfail Estate to the north-east.
