= Utchee Creek, Queensland =

Utchee Creek
- Suburb
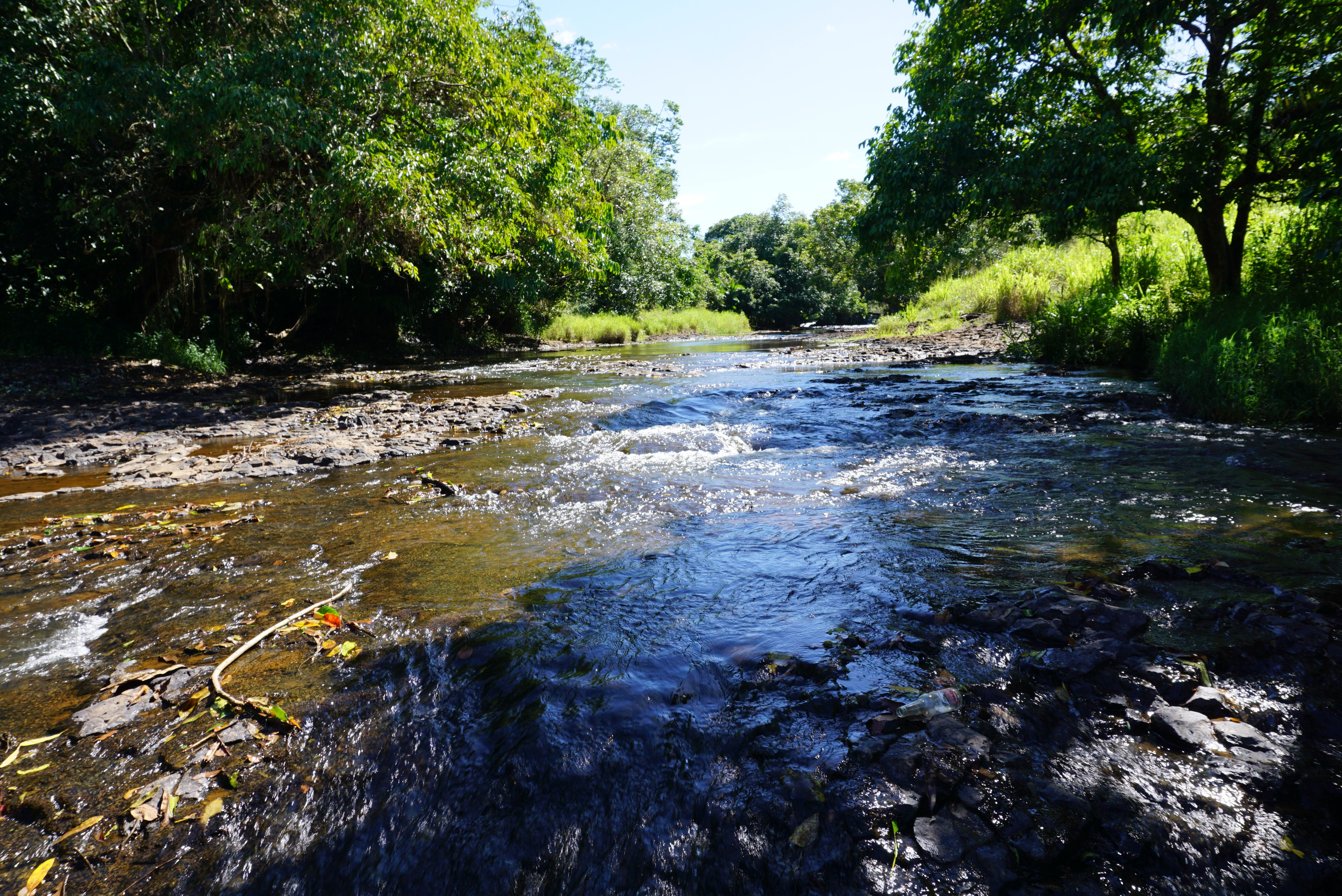
- Utchee Creek, 2021

- Interactive map of Utchee Creek
- Coordinates: 17.6311°S 145.9236°E
- Country: Australia
- State: Queensland
- LGA: Cassowary Coast Region
- Location: 22.4 km (13.9 mi) SW of Innisfail; 112 km (70 mi) S of Cairns; 259 km (161 mi) NNW of Townsville; 1,610 km (1,000 mi) NNW of Brisbane

Government
  - State electorate: Hill
  - Federal division: Kennedy

Area
  - Total: 28.6 km^{2} (11.0 sq mi)

Population
  - Total: 256 (2021 census)
  - Density: 8.95/km^{2} (23.18/sq mi)
- Time zone: UTC+10:00 (AEST)
- Postcode: 4871
Suburbs around Utchee Creek
Mamu	No 6 Branch	Camp Creek
Mamu	Utchee Creek	Germantown
Mena Creek	Mena Creek	Mena Creek

Utchee Creek is a rural locality in the Cassowary Coast Region, Queensland, Australia. In the 2021 census, Utchee Creek had a population of 256 people.

== Geography ==
Utchee Creek is a farming area. It has many locally owned banana farms along with various other crops.

The locality presumably takes its name from the watercourse Utchee Creek which rises near Mount Utchee in neighbouring Mamu to the west, then meanders through the southern part of the locality of Utchee Creek, briefly forms a part of the eastern boundary of the locality, and then flows into neighbouring Camp Creek to the north-east where it becomes a tributary of Boolabah Creek, just before Boolabah Creek becomes a tributary of the South Johnstone River.

== Demographics ==
In the 2016 census, Utchee Creek had a population of 255 people.

In the 2021 census, Utchee Creek had a population of 256 people.

== Education ==
There are no schools in Utchee Creek. The nearest government primary school is Mena Creek State School in neighbouring Mena Creek to the south-east. The nearest government secondary school is Innisfail State College in Innisfail Estate, Innisfail.
