= Boogan, Queensland =

Boogan
- Suburb
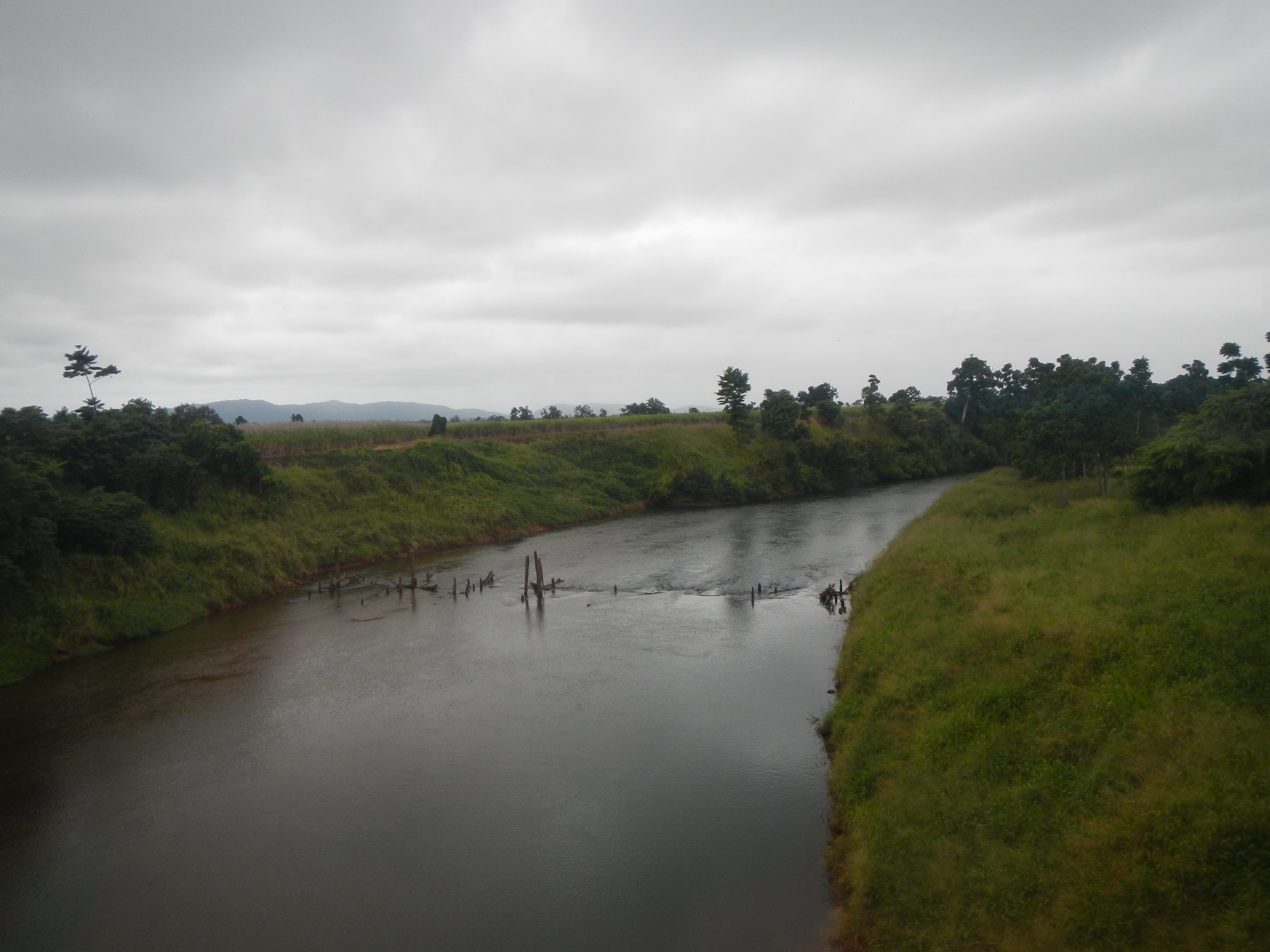
- South Johnstone River at Boogan, 2013

- Interactive map of Boogan
- Coordinates: 17.6086°S 146.0119°E
- Country: Australia
- State: Queensland
- LGA: Cassowary Coast Region
- Location: 11.9 km (7.4 mi) SSW of Innisfail; 99.1 km (61.6 mi) S of Cairns; 250 km (160 mi) NNW of Townsville; 1,608 km (999 mi) NNW of Brisbane

Government
  - State electorate: Hill
  - Federal division: Kennedy

Area
  - Total: 13.0 km^{2} (5.0 sq mi)

Population
  - Total: 138 (2021 census)
  - Density: 10.62/km^{2} (27.49/sq mi)
- Time zone: UTC+10:00 (AEST)
- Postcode: 4871
Suburbs around Boogan
Currajah	Stockton	Mourilyan
South Johnstone; Camp Creek	Boogan	Martyville
Basilisk	Moresby	Martyville

Boogan is a rural locality in the Cassowary Coast Region, Queensland, Australia. In the 2021 census, Boogan had a population of 138 people.

== Geography ==
The Bruce Highway forms part of the eastern boundary of the locality, while the South Johnstone River forms the north-western boundary. The land is relatively flat and low-lying (10–20 metres (33–66 ft) above sea level) and is predominantly used for cropping, particularly sugarcane. The North Coast railway line passes from south to north through the middle of the locality with the locality served by the Boogan railway station i (17.6075°S 146.0129°E). There is also a cane tramway to transport harvested sugarcane to the local sugar mills.

== History ==
The locality takes its name from the Boogan railway station named by the Queensland Railways Department on 12 September 1920. Boogan is an Aboriginal word meaning either forest country or dog.

Boogan State School opened on 15 July 1929 and closed on 14 December 1979. It was on a 1-acre-2-rood-5-perch (0.62 ha) site between the North Coast railway line and Kate Boylan Road (approx 17.60197°S 146.01144°E).

== Demographics ==
In the 2016 census, Boogan had a population of 119 people.

In the 2021 census, Boogan had a population of 138 people.

== Education ==
There are no schools in Boogan. The nearest government primary schools are South Johnstone State School in neighbouring South Johnstone to the west and Mourilyan State School in neighbouring Mourilyan to the north-east. The nearest government secondary school is Innisfail State College in Innisfail Estate to the north.
