= Cullinane, Queensland =

Cullinane
- Suburb
- Interactive map of Cullinane
- Coordinates: 17.5127°S 146.0213°E
- Country: Australia
- State: Queensland
- LGA: Cassowary Coast Region
- Location: 1.7 km (1.1 mi) N of Innisfail; 87.9 km (54.6 mi) SSE of Cairns; 261 km (162 mi) NNW of Townsville; 1,596 km (992 mi) NNW of Brisbane

Government
  - State electorate: Hill
  - Federal division: Kennedy

Area
  - Total: 1.7 km^{2} (0.66 sq mi)

Population
  - Total: 551 (2021 census)
  - Density: 324/km^{2} (839/sq mi)
- Time zone: UTC+10:00 (AEST)
- Postcode: 4860
Suburbs around Cullinane
Goondi	Sundown	Innisfail Estate
Goondi Bend	Cullinane	Innisfail Estate
Goondi Hill	Innisfail	Innisfail Estate

Cullinane is a rural locality in the Cassowary Coast Region, Queensland, Australia. In the 2021 census, Cullinane had a population of 551 people.

== Geography ==
Cullinane is bounded by the North Coast railway line to the west, See Poy Road to the north, Johnstone River to the east and Campbell Street to the south-east.

The land is flat and below 10 metres (33 ft) above sea level. There is some suburban housing in the east of the suburb but the remainder of the suburb is used for agriculture, predominantly sugarcane farming.

== History ==
The locality name was adopted in August 1996. It was proposed by the Johnstone Shire Council, after pioneer farmer Michael Cullinane.

== Demographics ==
In the 2016 census, Cullinane had a population of 524 people.

In the 2021 census, Cullinane had a population of 551 people.

== Education ==
There are no schools in Cullinane. The nearest government primary school is Innisfail State School in neighbouring Innisfail to the south. The nearest government secondary school is Innisfail State College in Innisfail Estate across the river to the east. There are Catholic primary and secondary schools in Innisfail.
