= Hudson, Queensland =

Hudson
- Suburb
- Interactive map of Hudson
- Coordinates: 17.5263°S 145.9975°E
- Country: Australia
- State: Queensland
- LGA: Cassowary Coast Region
- Location: 2.7 km (1.7 mi) W of Innisfail; 86.6 km (53.8 mi) SSE of Cairns; 262 km (163 mi) NNW of Townsville; 1,765 km (1,097 mi) NNW of Brisbane

Government
  - State electorate: Hill
  - Federal division: Kennedy

Area
  - Total: 2.2 km^{2} (0.85 sq mi)
- Elevation: 10–20 m (33–66 ft)

Population
  - Total: 238 (2021 census)
  - Density: 108.2/km^{2} (280/sq mi)
- Time zone: UTC+10:00 (AEST)
- Postcode: 4860
Suburbs around Hudson
Goondi	Goondi	Goondi Bend
Belvedere	Hudson	Goondi Bend
Stoters Hill	Bamboo Creek	Bamboo Creek

Hudson is a rural locality in the Cassowary Coast Region, Queensland, Australia. In the 2021 census, Hudson had a population of 238 people.

== Geography ==
The locality is on the western edge of the town of Innisfail.

The Bruce Highway enters the locality from the north-east (Goondi Bend), forms the northern boundary of the locality and exits to the north-west (Belvedere / Goondi). The locality is bounded to the east by Swampy Creek.

The land is very flat, approx 10 metres (33 ft) above sea level except for an area in the east of the locality which is on a small hill approx 20 metres (66 ft) above sea level. The land use is predominantly crop growing, a mixture of bananas and sugarcane. The hill in the east of the locality is used for suburban housing. There is some grazing on native vegetation in the south-west of the locality.

There is a cane tramway through the locality to transport the harvested sugarcane to the local sugar mill.

== History ==
The locality was named after selector Gilbert Francis Hudson.

== Demographics ==
In the 2016 census, Hudson had a population of 236 people.

In the 2021 census, Hudson had a population of 238 people.

== Education ==
There are no schools in Hudson. The nearest government primary school is Goondi State School in neighbouring Goondi Bend to the east. The nearest government secondary school is Innisfail State College in Innisfail Estate to the east.
