= Goondi Hill, Queensland =

Goondi Hill
- Suburb
- Interactive map of Goondi Hill
- Coordinates: 17.5286°S 146.0138°E
- Country: Australia
- State: Queensland
- LGA: Cassowary Coast Region
- Location: 1.7 km (1.1 mi) W of Innisfail; 86.8 km (53.9 mi) S of Cairns; 261 km (162 mi) NNW of Townsville; 1,592 km (989 mi) NNW of Brisbane

Government
  - State electorate: Hill
  - Federal division: Kennedy

Area
  - Total: 2.3 km^{2} (0.89 sq mi)

Population
  - Total: 437 (2021 census)
  - Density: 190/km^{2} (492/sq mi)
- Time zone: UTC+10:00 (AEST)
- Postcode: 4860
Suburbs around Goondi Hill
Goondi Bend	Cullinane	Cullinane
Goondi Bend	Goondi Hill	Innisfail
Bamboo Creek	Bamboo Creek	Mighell

Goondi Hill is a semi-urban locality in the Cassowary Coast Region, Queensland, Australia. In the 2021 census, Goondi Hill had a population of 437 people.

== Geography ==
Goondi Hill is bounded by Bamboo Creek and North Bamboo Creek to the south and south-west. The land is flat, mostly below 10 metres (33 ft) above sea level.

Immediately west of Innisfail, it has some residential overflow from Innisfail including a retirement village in the north of the locality. In the south of the locality the land use is predominantly agricultural, mostly growing sugarcane. Most of the locality contains various civic amenities, such as the race course, the golf course and the showground.

The Bruce Highway enters the locality from the east (along Edith Street, Innisfail) and exits to the west (along Palmerston Drive, Goondi Bend).

The North Coast railway line enters the locality from the south (Mighell) and exits the locality to the north-west (Goondi Bend / Cullinane) with Innisfail railway station within the locality (17.5264°S 146.0189°E).

== History ==
The name Goondi is believed to be an Aboriginal word meaning elbow, referring to the bend in the South Johnstone River.

In June 1912 there was a meeting that resulted in the creation of the Johnstone River Agricultural Association with the intention to hold their first agricultural show that same year. The first show was held on Friday 11 and Saturday 12 October 1912 in recreation ground (now Callender Park) with exhibits in the Shire Hall and the Oddfellows Hall. In 1935 the show needed more space and the present showgrounds were established with purpose-built buildings and a show ring. The show was held annually apart from 1942 and 1942 when, due to World War II, the army was using the showground. In 1986 many of the showgound's buildings were badly damaged by Cyclone Winifred with further damage sustained during Cyclone Larry in 2006. In 2002 the show introduced a banana packing competition which was very popular.

== Demographics ==
In the 2016 census, Goondi Hill had a population of 510 people.

In the 2021 census, Goondi Hill had a population of 437 people.

== Education ==
There are no schools in Goondi Hill. The nearest government primary schools are Goondi State School in neighbouring Goondi Bend to the west and Innisfail State School in neighbouring Innisfail to the east. The nearest government secondary school is Innisfail State College in Innisfail Estate to the east. Catholic primary and secondary schooling is available in Innisfail.

== Amenities ==
All accessible from the Bruce Highway are the following amenities:

- Innisfail Showground (17.5257°S 146.0162°E)
- Innisfail Racecourse (17.5277°S 146.0147°E)
- Innisfail Golf Course (17.5300°S 146.0178°E)
