= Stockton, Queensland =

Stockton
- Suburb
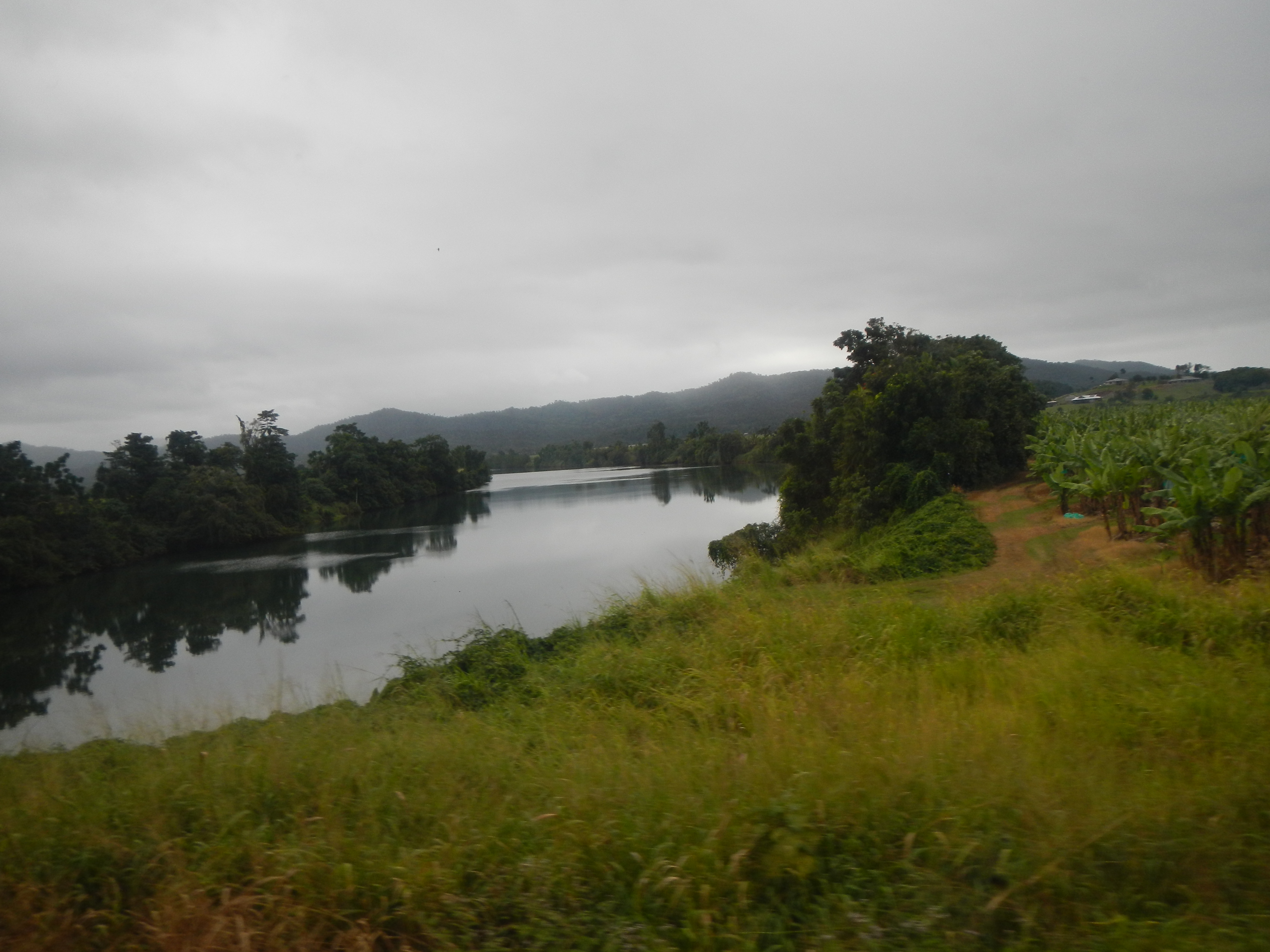
- South Johnstone River, Stockton, 2013

- Interactive map of Stockton
- Coordinates: 17.5797°S 146.0208°E
- Country: Australia
- State: Queensland
- LGA: Cassowary Coast Region
- Location: 7.8 km (4.8 mi) SSW of Innisfail; 94.7 km (58.8 mi) SSE of Cairns; 257 km (160 mi) NNW of Townsville; 1,607 km (999 mi) NNW of Brisbane

Government
  - State electorate: Hill
  - Federal division: Kennedy

Area
  - Total: 3.7 km^{2} (1.4 sq mi)

Population
  - Total: 57 (2021 census)
  - Density: 15.4/km^{2} (39.9/sq mi)
- Time zone: UTC+10:00 (AEST)
- Postcode: 4871
Suburbs around Stockton
Wangan	Mundoo	Comoon Loop
Wangan	Stockton	Mourilyan
Currajah	Boogan	Mourilyan

Stockton is a rural locality in the Cassowary Coast Region, Queensland, Australia. In the 2021 census, Stockton had a population of 57 people.

== Geography ==
The South Johnstone River bounds the locality to the south-west, south, south-east, east, and north-east.

The land use is predominantly crop growing (mostly sugarcane and bananas) with some grazing on native vegetation.

== Demographics ==
In the 2016 census, Stockton had a population of 29 people.

In the 2021 census, Stockton had a population of 57 people.

== Education ==
There are no schools in Stockton. The nearest government primary school is Mundoo State School in neighbouring Wangan to the west. The nearest government secondary school is Innisfail State College in Innisfail Estate, Innisfail, to the north-east.
