= Bamboo Creek, Queensland =

Bamboo Creek
- Suburb
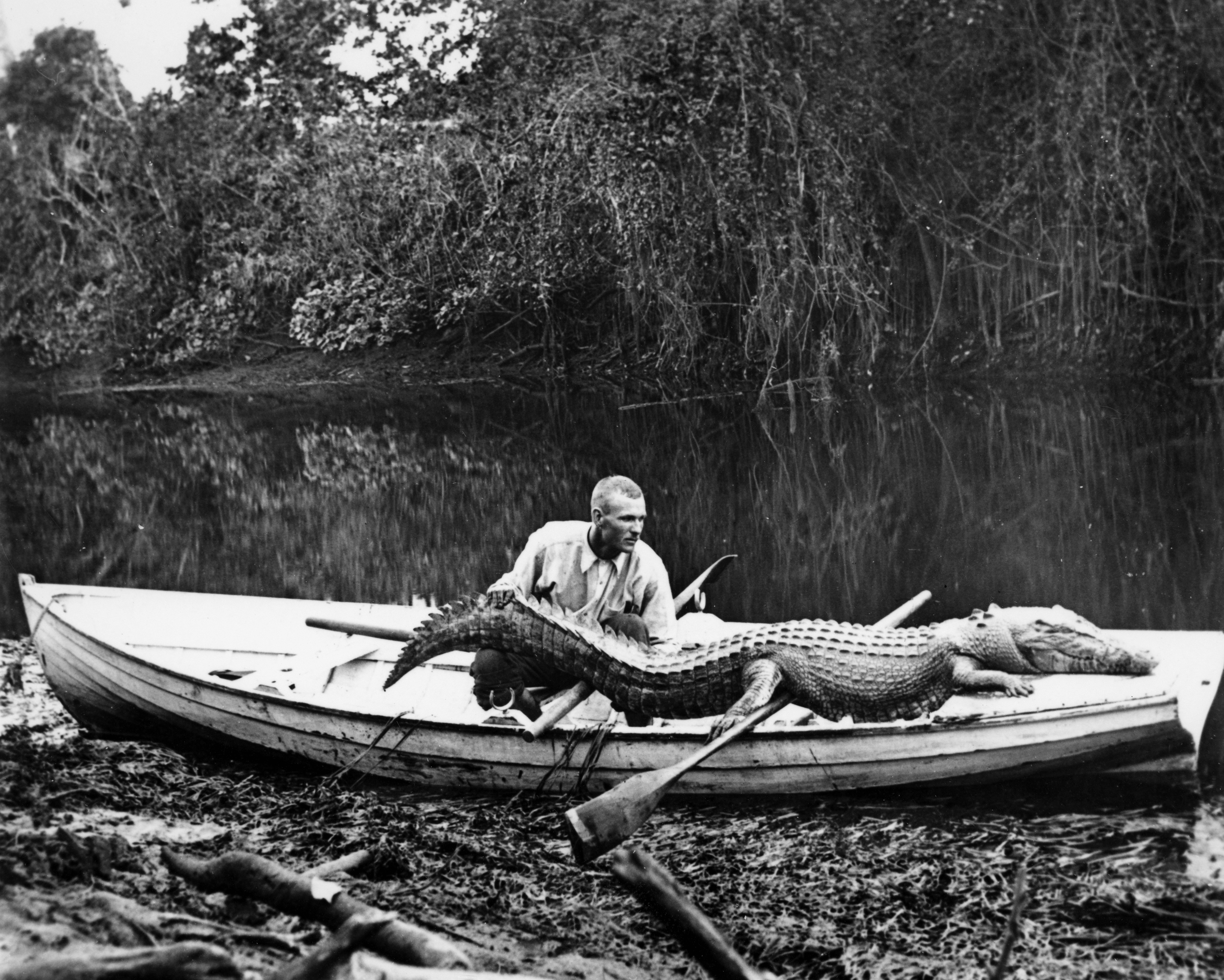
- Crocodile hunter with his catch in his dinghy, Bamboo Creek

- Interactive map of Bamboo Creek
- Coordinates: 17.5527°S 145.9891°E
- Country: Australia
- State: Queensland
- LGA: Cassowary Coast Region
- Location: 7.6 km (4.7 mi) SW of Innisfail; 91.6 km (56.9 mi) S of Cairns; 258 km (160 mi) NNW of Townsville; 1,616 km (1,004 mi) NNW of Brisbane

Government
  - State electorate: Hill
  - Federal division: Kennedy

Area
  - Total: 12.8 km^{2} (4.9 sq mi)

Population
  - Total: 88 (2021 census)
  - Density: 6.88/km^{2} (17.81/sq mi)
- Time zone: UTC+10:00 (AEST)
- Postcode: 4860
Suburbs around Bamboo Creek
Stoters Hill	Hudson	Goondi Bend; Goondi Hill
Pin Gin Hill	Bamboo Creek	Mundoo; Mighell
Currajah	Wangan	Wangan

Bamboo Creek is a rural locality in the Cassowary Coast Region, Queensland, Australia. In the 2021 census, Bamboo Creek had a population of 88 people.

== Geography ==
The locality is bounded to the north-east by the north branch of the watercourse Bamboo Creek and to east and partly to the south by south branch of Bamboo Creek. The creek is a tributary of the South Johnstone River.

The land use is agricultural and split between crop growing and grazing on native vegetation. The predominant crop is sugarcane, grown mostly in the north and east of the locality.

== History ==
Large crocodiles have been seen and caught in the watercourse Bamboo Creek over the years.

== Demographics ==
In the 2016 census, Bamboo Creek had a population of 94 people.

In the 2021 census, Bamboo Creek had a population of 88 people.

== Education ==
The nearest government primary schools are Goondi State School in neighbouring Goondi Bend to north-east and Mundoo State School in neighbouring Wangan to the south-east. The nearest government secondary school is Innisfail State College in Innisfail Estate, Innisfail, to the north-east.
