= Mundoo, Queensland =

Mundoo
- Town
- Interactive map of Mundoo
- Coordinates: 17.5588°S 146.0169°E
- Country: Australia
- State: Queensland
- LGA: Cassowary Coast Region
- Location: 5.6 km (3.5 mi) S of Innisfail; 93.1 km (57.8 mi) S of Cairns; 261 km (162 mi) NNW of Townsville; 1,595 km (991 mi) NNW of Brisbane

Government
  - State electorate: Hill
  - Federal division: Kennedy

Area
  - Total: 4.4 km^{2} (1.7 sq mi)

Population
  - Total: 197 (2021 census)
  - Density: 44.8/km^{2} (116.0/sq mi)
- Time zone: UTC+10:00 (AEST)
- Postcode: 4860
Localities around Mundoo
Bamboo Creek	Mighell	South Innisfail
Bamboo Creek	Mundoo	Comoon Loop
Bamboo Creek	Wangan	Stockton

Mundoo is a rural town and locality in the Cassowary Coast Region, Queensland, Australia. In the 2021 census, the locality of Mundoo had a population of 197 people.

== Geography ==
The locality of Mundoo is to the south of the regional centre of Innisfail.

The locality is bounded to the west by the South Johnstone River. The town of Mundoo is roughly in the centre of the locality and has a small collection of houses. The town is on the north-eastern side of the Mundoo Aerodrome (17.5594°S 146.0122°E).

The vast majority of Mundoo is currently under sugar cane cultivation, the main agricultural crop for the region. There are also small pockets of bananas and other tropical fruits such as pawpaw.

The North Coast railway line enters the locality from the south (Wangan), passes through the town which was served by the now-abandoned Mundoo railway station (17.5590°S 146.0172°E), and exits to the north (Mighell). There is also a network of cane tramways through the locality to transport the harvested sugarcane to the local sugar mills.

== History ==
The town takes its name from the Mundoo railway station which was named by the Queensland Railways Department on 21 August 1919. It is believed to be the name of a local Aboriginal clan.

Mundoo Post Office opened on 1 July 1927 (a receiving office had been open from 1895), closed in 1931, reopened in 1953 and closed again in 1974.

Mundoo Provisional School opened on 5 August 1895. On 1 January 1909 it became Mundoo State School.

== Demographics ==
In the 2006 census, the locality of Mundoo and the surrounding area had a population of 121 people.

In the 2016 census, the locality of Mundoo had a population of 224 people.

In the 2021 census, the locality of Mundoo had a population of 197 people.

== Education ==
There are no schools in Mundoo. Despite the name, Mundoo State School is within the neighbouring locality of Wangan to the south and is the nearest government primary school. The nearest government secondary school is Innisfail State College in Innisfail Estate, Innisfail.
