= Wangan, Queensland =

Wangan
- Town
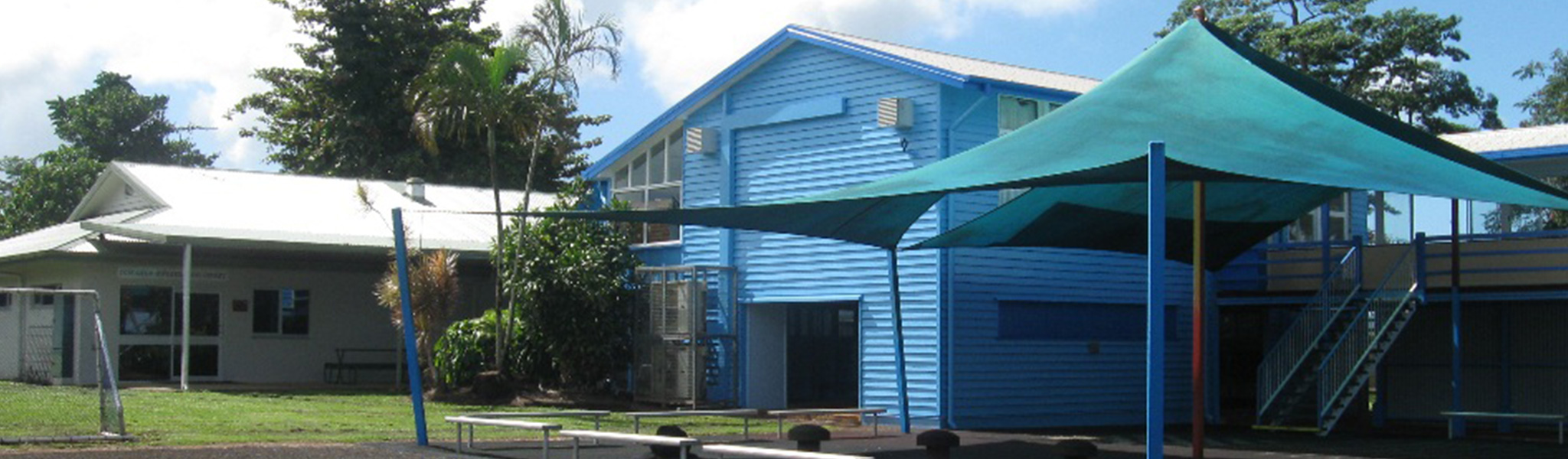
- Mundoo State School at Wangan, 2023

- Interactive map of Wangan
- Coordinates: 17.5738°S 146.0102°E
- Country: Australia
- State: Queensland
- LGA: Cassowary Coast Region
- Location: 7.4 km (4.6 mi) SSW of Innisfail; 94.6 km (58.8 mi) S of Cairns; 256 km (159 mi) NNW of Townsville; 1,608 km (999 mi) NNW of Brisbane

Government
  - State electorate: Hill
  - Federal division: Kennedy

Area
  - Total: 3.3 km^{2} (1.3 sq mi)

Population
  - Total: 612 (2021 census)
  - Density: 185.5/km^{2} (480/sq mi)
- Time zone: UTC+10:00 (AEST)
- Postcode: 4871
Localities around Wangan
Bamboo Creek	Mundoo	Mundoo
Currajah	Wangan	Stockton
Currajah	Currajah	Stockton

Wangan is a town and a locality in the Cassowary Coast Region, Queensland, Australia. In the 2021 census, the locality of Wangan had a population of 612 people.

== Geography ==
The locality is bounded to the north-west by the south branch of Bamboo Creek and to the south-east by Scheu Creek. The town is central within the locality. Outside of the town, the land is used for crop-growing, predominately sugarcane.

The North Coast railway line enters the locality from the south-east (Stockton), passes along the western edge of the town, and exits to the north-east (Mundoo). The Wangan railway station on the North Coast line is now abandoned (17.5753°S 146.0139°E).

There is a network of cane tramways through the locality for transporting the harvested sugarcane to the South Johnstone sugar mill. The Currajah railway siding (17.5783°S 146.0060°E) in on this network.

== History ==
Mundoo Provisional School opened on 5 August 1895. It became Mundoo State School on 1 January 1909.

St Paul's Catholic Church was built in 1956 from timber. It later closed. It was in Meyer Street (approx 17.576784°S 146.009527°E).

== Demographics ==
In the 2016 census, the locality of Wangan had a population of 641 people.

In the 2021 census, the locality of Wangan had a population of 612 people.

== Education ==
Mundoo State School is a government primary (Prep-6) school for boys and girls at 100 Cardier Road (17.5667°S 146.0112°E) on the boundary with neighbouring Mundoo. In 2017, the school had an enrolment of 25 students with 3 teachers (2 full-time equivalent) and 5 non-teaching staff (3 full-time equivalent). In 2018, the school had an enrolment of 27 students with 4 teachers (3 full-time equivalent) and 5 non-teaching staff (3 full-time equivalent). In 2022, the school had an enrolment of 47 students.

There are no secondary schools in Wangan. The nearest government secondary school is Innisfail State College in Innisfail Estate to the north.

== Community groups ==
The East Palmerston branch of the Queensland Country Women's Association meets at the Currajah Hotel in Grima Street.
