= Paronella Park =

Park in Mena Creek, Queensland, Australia

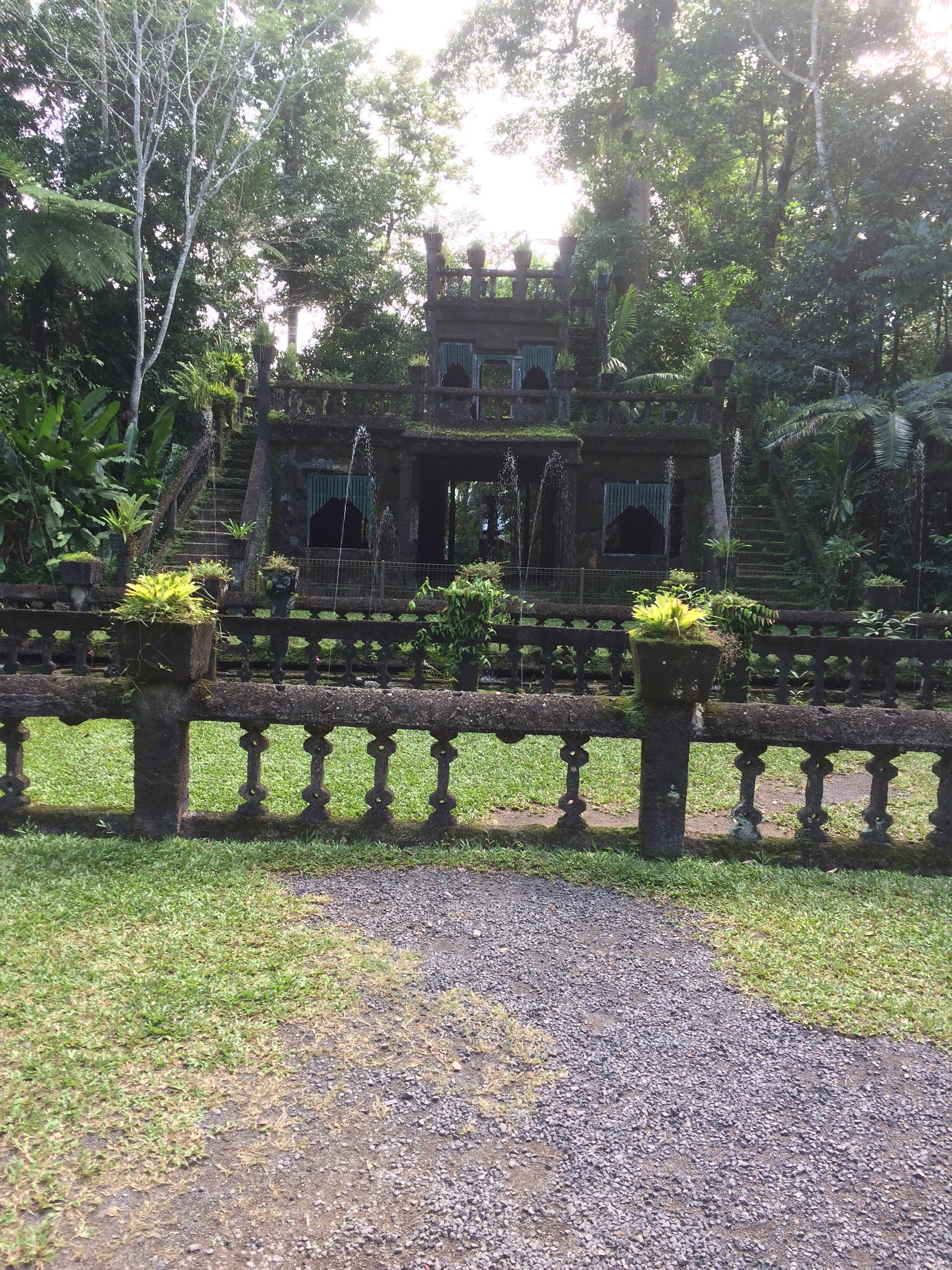
- Paronella Park Refreshment Rooms, 2016
- Interactive map of Paronella Park
- Location: Mena Creek, Queensland, Australia
- Nearest city: Innisfail, Queensland
- Coordinates: 17°39′09″S 145°57′23″E
- Area: 13 acres (5.3 ha)
- Established: 1929
- Founder: José Paronella
- Owner: Mark and Judy Evans
- Open: All year except Christmas Day
- Plants: 7,500+
- Opened: 1935
- Website: www.paronellapark.com.au

Paronella Park is located at Mena Creek, Queensland, Australia, 120 kilometres (75 mi) south of Cairns. Designed from the first as an entertainment attraction in a park-like setting, it was modeled on Spanish and European architecture and featured outdoor spaces for activities like swimming, playing tennis, strolling and picnicking. It fell derelict for a few decades but has been refurbished into a heritage-listed tourist attraction.

== History ==
It was designed and built between 1929 and 1935 by Spanish immigrant José Pedro Enrique Paronella. He had been born on 26 February 1887 in the hamlet of La Vall de Santa Creu in the province of Girona, north-eastern Catalonia. Paronella left Spain for Australia, in 1913. He applied for Commonwealth naturalization in 1921. For eleven years he bought land, developed it into farms, then sold it for handsome profit. He also bought and operated a mine and lent money at interest. In 1924 he returned to Spain to marry and after an extended honeymoon, the couple returned to Australia. Paronella wanted to build a tourist attraction modeled on the castles of his native Catalonia. By 1929 he had purchased the land, which included a waterfall. He built a small stone house for his family, then proceeded to build, at the same level as the waterfall, a pavilion that doubled as both a movie theater and ballroom. He built a grand outdoor staircase leading down to the level of the lagoon below the waterfall. Beside the lagoon he built an outdoor dining area with stone tables, benches and a balustrade. Near these, at the foot of the staircase, he located refreshment and changing rooms. A fountain was built nearby. He built tennis courts and woodsy walkways beneath trees he planted. Determined to make the park self-sufficient, José installed Queensland's first private hydroelectric system in 1934. Inspired by hydroelectricity in Europe, he recognised the potential of Mena Creek Falls. With no formal training, he sought guidance from South Johnstone Mill engineers, who, impressed by his determination, helped him develop the system. Water flowed through an aqueduct onto a 30-foot drop, powering a turbine and DC generator from ex-army stock. The system supplied lighting, pumps, refrigeration, and cinema power. The park opened in 1933. It received its first cyclone damage in 1946 when logs washed down the waterfall into the refreshment rooms. The park was repaired, replanted and re-opened 6 months later. The park passed out of the family's ownership in 1977. Two years the cinema/ballroom was gutted by fire, leaving only a shell.

The park was bought in 1993 and its refurbishment began. Today, Paronella Park is eco-certified and heritage listed.

== Awards and recognitions ==
2004 – Queensland's premier significant attraction

2004 – joint winner, "Emerging Business"

2009 – Number One "Must Do"

2009 – one of the Q150 Icons

== In popular entertainment ==
The park was a filming location for the 1993 film Sniper. The refreshment rooms feature as the ruined Hotel Europa in the Panamanian jungle.

On 24 July 2010, a theatrical production, The Impossible Dream, based on the story of José and Margarita, was launched at the Shangri-La Hotel, The Marina, Cairns.

Much of the action in the 2018 film Celeste takes place in public areas of Paronella Park.
