= Mourilyan, Queensland =

Mourilyan
- Town
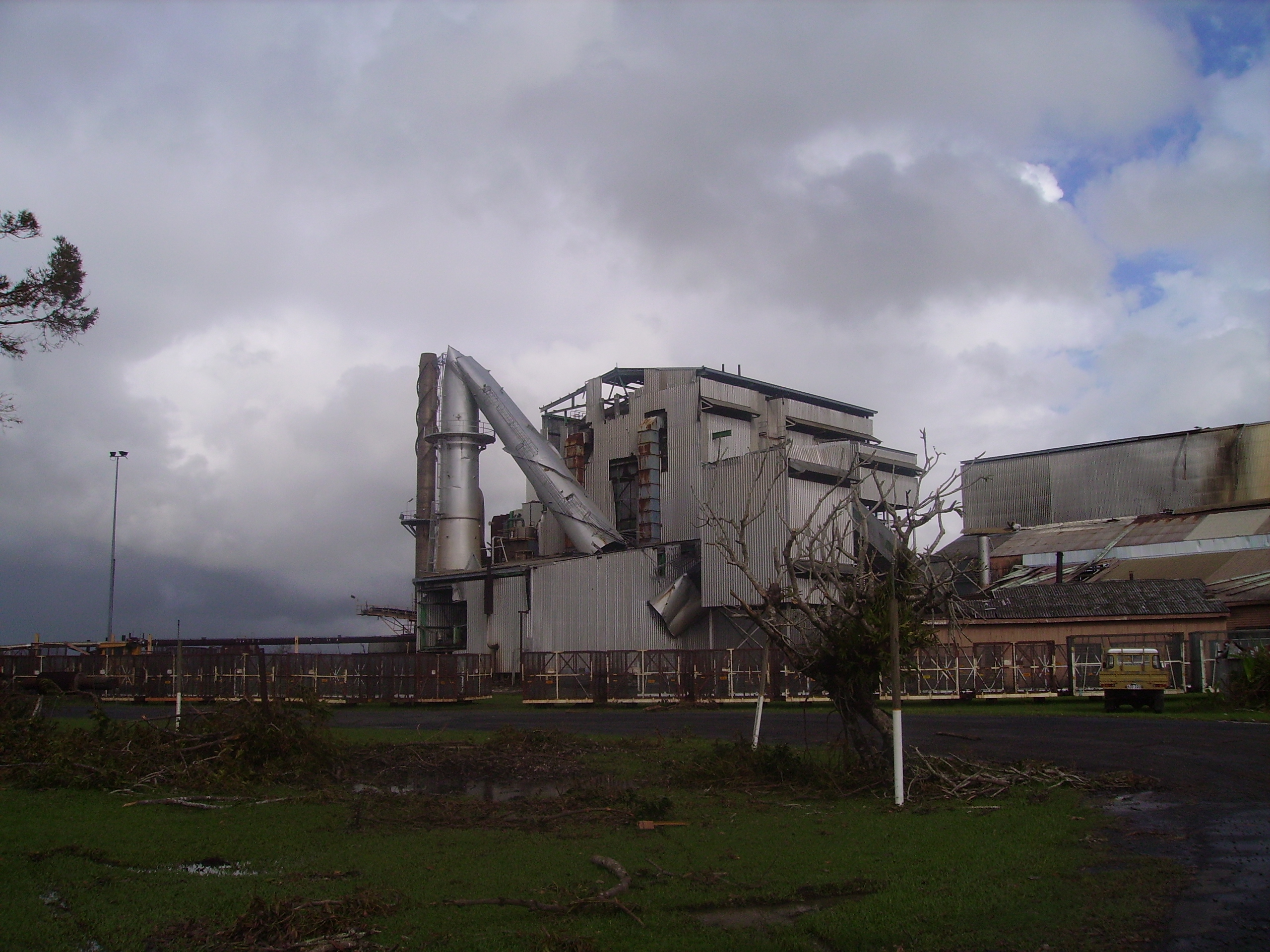
- The Mourilyan sugar mill after Cyclone Larry

- Interactive map of Mourilyan
- Coordinates: 17.5822°S 146.0428°E
- Country: Australia
- State: Queensland
- LGA: Cassowary Coast Region
- Location: 7.8 km (4.8 mi) S of Innisfail; 95.3 km (59.2 mi) S of Cairns; 252 km (157 mi) NNW of Townsville; 1,608 km (999 mi) NNW of Brisbane

Government
  - State electorate: Hill
  - Federal division: Kennedy

Population
  - Total: 509 (2021 census)
- Postcode: 4858
Localities around Mourilyan
Comoon Loop	South Innisfail	Coquette Point
Stockton	Mourilyan	Etty Bay
Boogan	Martyville; New Harbourline	Mourilyan Harbour

Mourilyan is a rural town and locality in the Cassowary Coast Region, Queensland, Australia. It was established around the Mourilyan sugar mill which provided much of the employment in the area until it was destroyed by Cyclone Larry on 20 March 2006. In the 2021 census, the locality of Mourilyan had a population of 509 people.

== Geography ==
The town is located 7.8 kilometres (4.8 mi) south of Innisfail on the Bruce Highway.

The land use is a mixture of crop growing (mostly sugarcane) towards the south and west and grazing on native vegetation to the north and east.

== History ==
The town takes its name from the Mourilyan Harbour, which was named by Captain John Moresby of HMS Basilisk, 1872, after his first lieutenant T.L. Mourilyan.

Construction of the Mourilyan sugar mill began in 1882, rendering it among the oldest in Australia. Excavation of the site was undertaken mainly by Kanakas, with assistance from Chinese and Anglo-Saxon labourers. After its completion in 1884, the mill had a processing capacity of 14 tonnes of sugar per 12-hour shift.

Mourilyan Provisional School opened on 29 January 1908. In 1909, it became Mourilyan State School.

In 1913, the Colonial Sugar Refining Company (now CSR) began purchasing sugar refined at the mill. Mourilyan remained a small settlement, growing only very slowly since.

Mourilyan Post Office opened by September 1910 (a receiving office had been open from 1884 when the mill opened).

The Mourilyan parish of the Roman Catholic Vicariate Apostolic of Cooktown (now the Roman Catholic Diocese of Cairns) was established in 1935. It is now merged with the Innisfail and South Johnstone parishes.

In March 2006, Cyclone Larry caused substantial damage to many households in the area, and destroyed the town's main source of employment. A major effort by the Australian Defence Force helped restore Mourilyan Primary School to functioning capacity. Insurance payouts have helped to repair residential and commercial properties.

== Demographics ==
In the 2006 census, the town of Mourilyan had a population of 424 people.

In the 2016 census, the locality of Mourilyan had a population of 571 people.

In the 2021 census, the locality of Mourilyan had a population of 509 people.

== Education ==
Mourilyan State School is a government primary (Prep–6) school for boys and girls at 34 Mourilyan Harbour Road (17.5851°S 146.0442°E). In 2018, the school had an enrolment of 172 students with 14 teachers (11 full-time equivalent) and 12 non-teaching staff (8 full-time equivalent).

There are no secondary schools in Mourilyan. The nearest government secondary school is Innisfail State College in Innisfail to the north.

== Amenities ==
Christ the King Catholic Church is at 10 Harbour Road. It is within the Innisfail Parish of the Roman Catholic Diocese of Cairns.

== Attractions ==
Mourilyan's main attraction is the Australian Sugar Industry Museum, which contains several relics from North Queensland's extensive sugar farming history. It also serves as a gateway to Mourilyan Harbour, Etty Bay and Paronella Park.

== See also ==
- List of tramways in Queensland
