= Mourilyan Harbour =

- Suburb
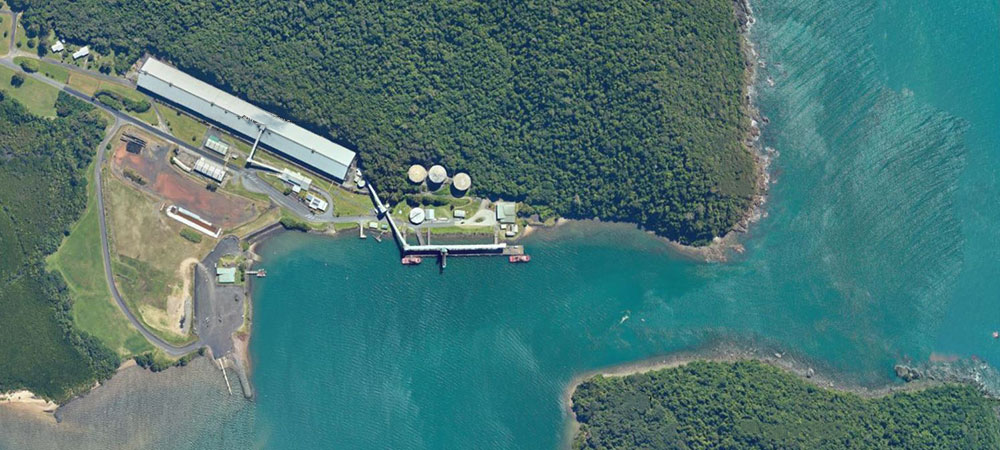
- Mourilyan Harbour port facilities

- Interactive map of Mourilyan Harbour
- Coordinates: 17.6022°S 146.1041°E
- Country: Australia
- State: Queensland
- LGA: Cassowary Coast Region
- Location: 12.5 km (7.8 mi) SE of Innisfail; 100 km (62 mi) SSE of Cairns; 257 km (160 mi) NNW of Townsville; 1,618 km (1,005 mi) NNW of Brisbane

Government
  - State electorate: Hill
  - Federal division: Kennedy

Area
  - Total: 26.8 km^{2} (10.3 sq mi)

Population
  - Total: 142 (2021 census)
  - Density: 5.299/km^{2} (13.72/sq mi)
- Time zone: UTC+10:00 (AEST)
- Postcode: 4858
Suburbs around Mourilyan Harbour
Etty Bay	Etty Bay	Coral Sea
Mourilyan	Mourilyan Harbour	Coral Sea
New Harbourline	Cowley Beach	Cowley Beach

Mourilyan Harbour is a coastal locality and harbour within the Cassowary Coast Region, Queensland, Australia. In the 2021 census, Mourilyan Harbour had a population of 142 people.

== Geography ==
The locality of Mourilyan Harbour is a coastal area bounded by the Coral Sea on the east and the Moresby River and one of its tributary creeks to the south.

The port facility is located on the northern bank of the mouth of the Moresby River (17.5998°S 146.1245°E). It is primarily used to export raw sugar and molasses but also handles other cargoes such as woodchips and cattle.

The Mourilyan Harbour Road runs roughly east–west through the locality linking the port to the town of Mourilyan to the immediate west.

Apart from the port, most of the developed land in the locality is used for growing sugarcane.

== History ==
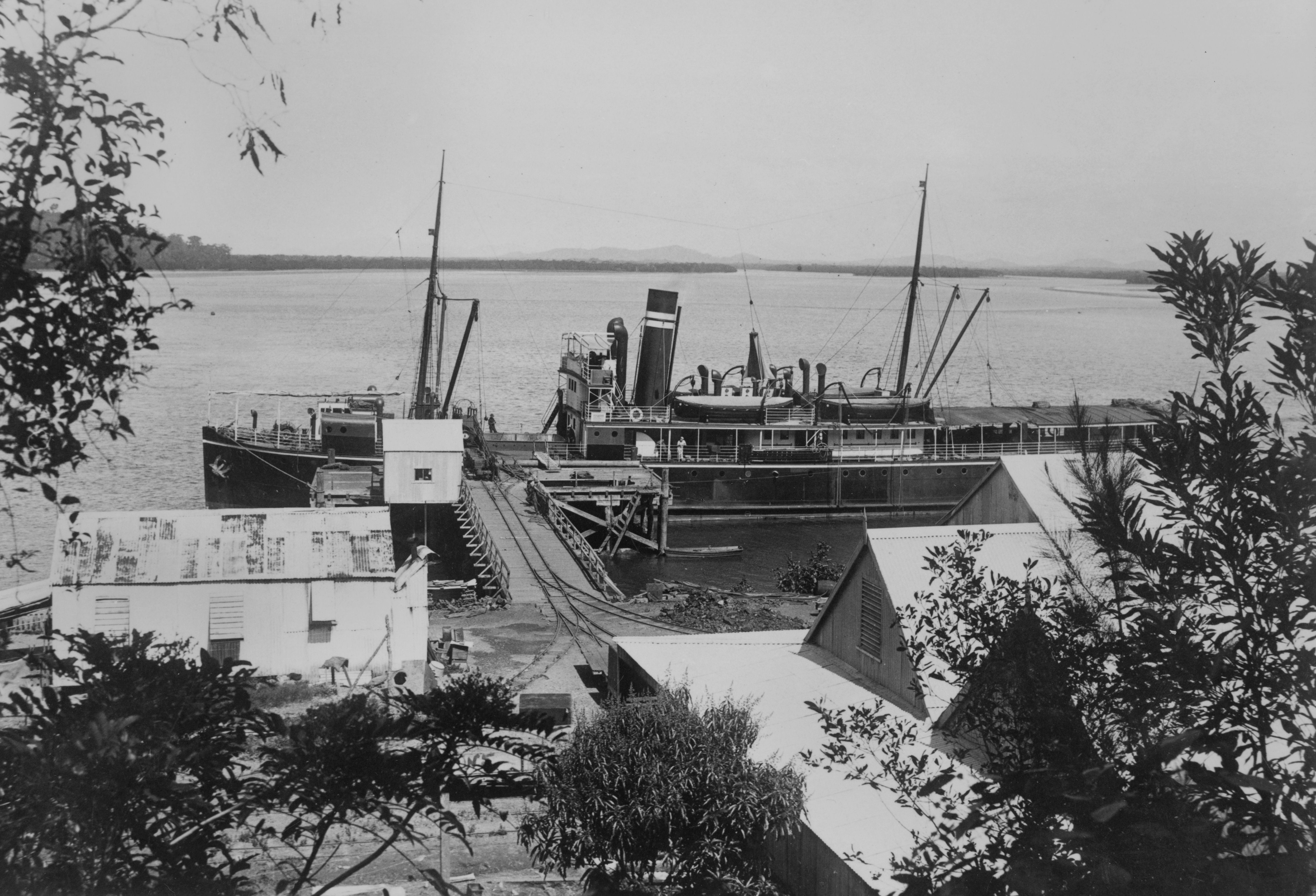
Steamsip Kuranda moored at Mourilyan Harbour Wharf, circa 1914

In 1872, John Moresby, a naval captain as well as hydrographer and explorer, charted Mourilyan Harbour on a coastal patrol in HMS Basilisk. He named it after one of his officers, Lieutenant T. L. Mourilyan. Moresby considered it to be an excellent landing place with a deepwater anchorage.

In the early 1880s, a small jetty was erected. In January 1884, construction began on a tramway from the harbour to the sugar mill at Mourilyan. In 1889, it was decided that steamers of up to 1,500 tons could be accommodated. A second jetty was built with a conveyor belt.

In 1903, a more major tramway development, known as the Geraldton Tramway initially but renamed the Innisfail Tramway when the town of Geraldton was renamed Innisfail, was undertaken to transport harvested sugar cane throughout the district to the mill and, after processing, to the harbour. The tramway was also used for other purposes, including carrying passengers from the harbour and also tourists wanting to visit the Fishery Falls.

From 1922 to 1924, the Queensland Government's Harbours and Rivers Department built a 416 feet (127 m) wharf with large sheds for sugar storage. The North Coast railway line from Brisbane to Cairns was completed in 1924, which reduced the passenger traffic through the harbour but the sugar industry was growing and the harbour became predominantly for shipping sugar.

After World War II, the Queensland Government decided to reduce the number of ports handled sugar to six ports which would be upgraded for bulk sugar handling. Mourilyan Harbour was one of the six chosen. In November 1957, a ship Wortanna carrying sugar went aground on a rocky bar near the harbour entrance, leading to the removal of the bar and the major upgrade to the harbour and its facilities for bulk handling, which was completed in June 1960. The new large conveyor belt could load sugar into a ship at 863 tonnes (849 long tons; 951 short tons) per hour, which made it one of the largest raw sugar handling ports in the world. The Mourilyan Harbour Board was established to operated the port. In September 1971, the port's storage shed capacity was further increased.

In 1997, it was decided that rail transport to the wharf was no longer required and that section of the line was removed but the line remains in use by farmers for transport of the sugar to the mill.

== Demographics ==
In the 2011 census, the population of Mourilyan Harbour was not separately reported but was included in the population for neighbouring New Harbourline with a combined population of 317 people.

In the 2016 census, Mourilyan Harbour had a population of 156 people.

In the 2021 census, Mourilyan Harbour had a population of 142 people.

== Port facility ==
The port of Mourilyan is around the mouth of the Moresby River into the Coral Sea (15.4594°S 145.2499°E). The port exports raw sugar and molasses from Innisfail, Babinda, Tully and the Atherton Tableland. The port also exports iron ore and livestock. It is operated by Ports North, based in Cairns.

== Education ==
There are no schools in Mourilyan Harbour. The nearest government primary school is Mourilyan State School in neighbouring Mourilyan to the west. The nearest government secondary school is Innisfail State College in Innisfail Estate to the north-west.

== Recreation ==
Mourilyan Harbour is known for its recreational fishing with many creeks and channels, lined with mangroves. Fish caught there include barramundi, mangrove jacks, giant trevally and queenfish. However, caution must be taken during windy weather as the water can become very choppy.

== See also ==
- List of tramways in Queensland
