= Mena Creek, Queensland =

Mena Creek
- Suburb
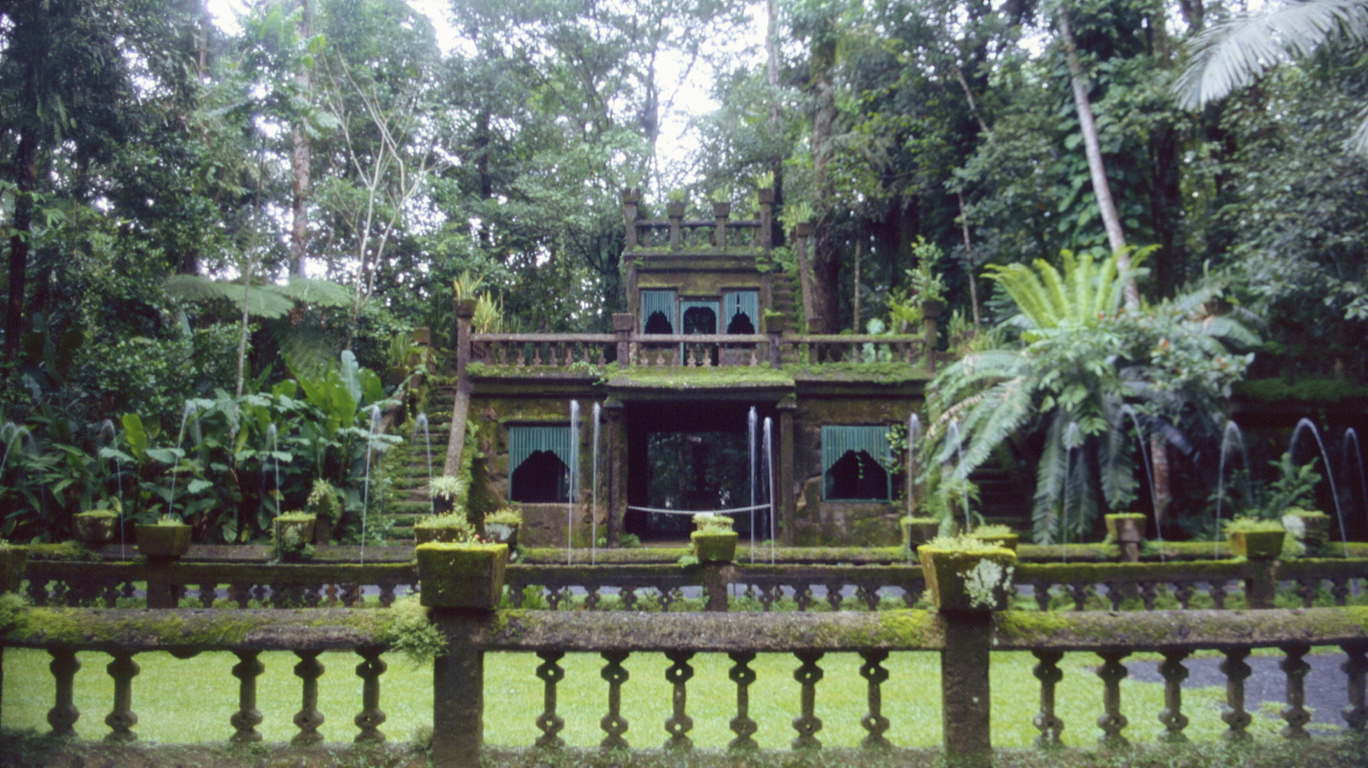
- Paronella Park, 2004

- Interactive map of Mena Creek
- Coordinates: 17.6727°S 145.9219°E
- Country: Australia
- State: Queensland
- LGA: Cassowary Coast Region
- Location: 18.9 km (11.7 mi) SW of Innisfail; 108 km (67 mi) S of Cairns; 254 km (158 mi) NNW of Townsville; 1,585 km (985 mi) NNW of Brisbane

Government
  - State electorate: Hill
  - Federal division: Kennedy

Area
  - Total: 24.5 km^{2} (9.5 sq mi)

Population
  - Total: 210 (2021 census)
  - Density: 8.57/km^{2} (22.2/sq mi)
- Time zone: UTC+10:00 (AEST)
- Postcode: 4871
Suburbs around Mena Creek
| Mamu | Utchee Creek | Germantown |
| Mamu | Mena Creek | Basilisk |
| Mamu | Mamu | Bombeeta |

Mena Creek is a rural locality in the Cassowary Coast Region, Queensland, Australia. In the 2021 census, Mena Creek had a population of 210 people.

== History ==
H. A. Noone an Irish resident of North Queensland since 1888 always had his eyes open for good timber for his saw mills, and just before 1900 his eyes turned towards Stewarts Creek (now Mena Creek) just 12 miles from Geraldton (now Innisfail). He saw that the area had huge stands of red cedar and would be a good area for cane farming. H. A. Noone realised that a single block had limited chance of survey and Government approval, so he formed a Settlement Group of 40 blocks of 160 acres and persuaded people to apply for the blocks. The authorities were impressed and the area was quickly surveyed and all 40 blocks were claimed. Then in a few years many farms in the area were cleared and H. A. began to focus on where to mill the sugar.

The locality took its name from the nearby creek, which in turn acquired its name from two possible origins:

- after local resident, (Philomena) Mena Fallon (née Noone) the youngest daughter of H. A. Noone a local cane farmer, who was the original settler in that area from around 1900. He encouraged settlement in the area, and built the first hotel there. The area was originally called Stewarts Creek but changed its name to Mena Creek due to confusion with Stewarts Creek in Townsville. With the need for a post office as the area developed, and mail confusion, Harry Noone had letterheads for Mena Creek created and after much haggling his request for Mena Creek was granted.
- Mena Camp, Cairo, Egypt, near the Mena House Hotel, where the First Australian Imperial Force had a training camp from December 1914 to April 1915 in preparation for the ANZAC landing at Gallipoli

Mena Creek State School opened on 15 March 1920.

Mena Creek Post Office opened on 10 February 1934.

== Demographics ==
In the 2016 census, Mena Creek had a population of 244 people.

In the 2021 census, Mena Creek had a population of 210 people.

== Heritage listings ==
Mena Creek has a number of heritage-listed sites, including:

- Mena Creek-Jappoon Road: Paronella Park

== Education ==
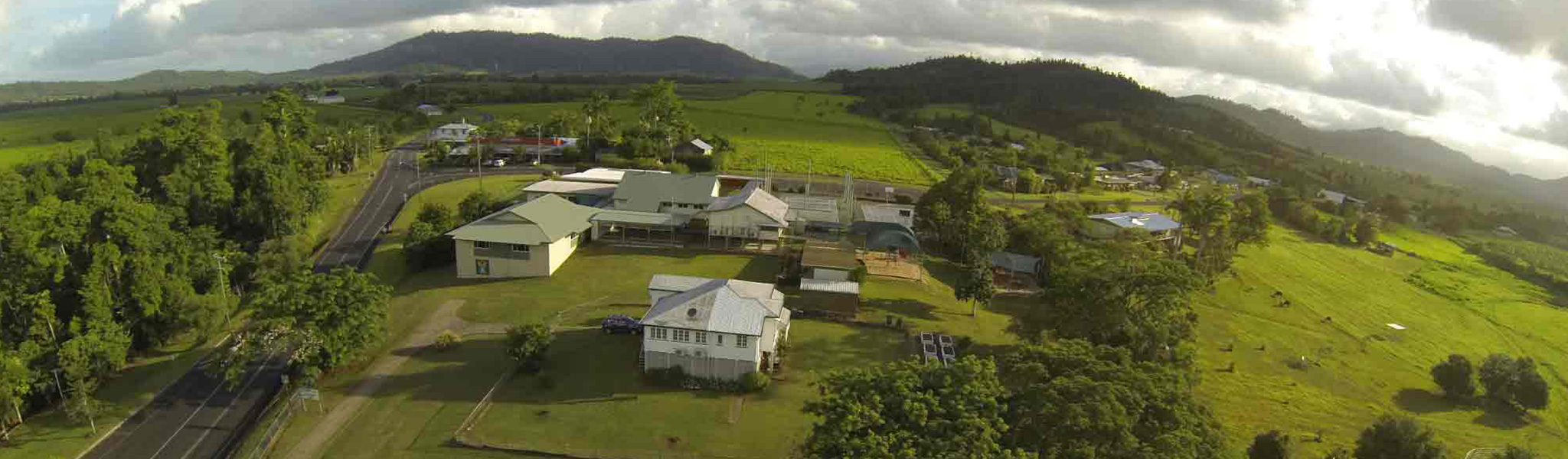
Mena Creek State School, 2022

Mena Creek State School is a government primary (Prep-6) school for boys and girls on Mena Creek Road (17.6547°S 145.9555°E). In 2018, the school had an enrolment of 38 students with 3 teachers (2 full-time equivalent) and 3 non-teaching staff (2 full-time equivalent).

There are no secondary schools in Mena Creek. The nearest government secondary school is Innisfail State College in Innisfail Estate to the north-east.
