= South Johnstone, Queensland =

South Johnstone
- Town
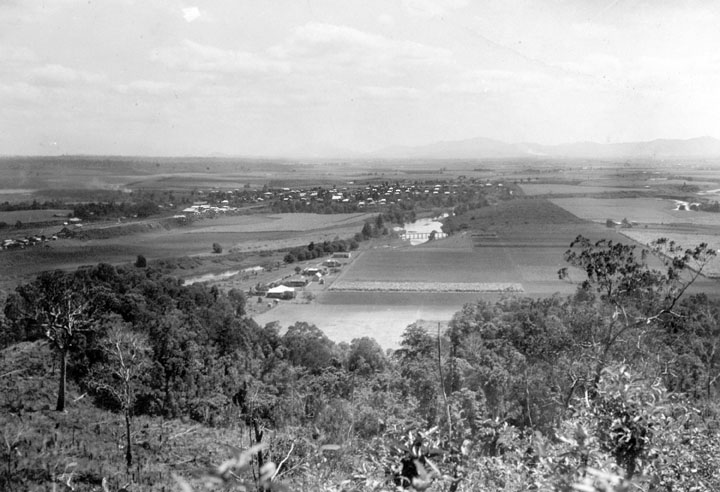
- South Johnstone Innisfail, circa 1938

- Interactive map of South Johnstone
- Coordinates: 17.5963°S 145.9961°E
- Country: Australia
- State: Queensland
- LGA: Cassowary Coast Region
- Location: 10.5 km (6.5 mi) SSW of Innisfail; 96.7 km (60.1 mi) S of Cairns; 253 km (157 mi) NNW of Townsville; 1,605 km (997 mi) NNW of Brisbane

Government
  - State electorate: Hill
  - Federal division: Kennedy

Area
  - Total: 4.0 km^{2} (1.5 sq mi)
- Elevation: 18 m (59 ft)

Population
  - Total: 456 (2021 census)
  - Density: 114.0/km^{2} (295/sq mi)
- Time zone: UTC+10:00 (AEST)
- Postcode: 4859
- Mean max temp: 28.2 °C (82.8 °F)
- Mean min temp: 19.4 °C (66.9 °F)
- Annual rainfall: 3,308.1 mm (130.24 in)
Localities around South Johnstone
Currajah	Currajah	Boogan
No 6 Branch	South Johnstone	Boogan
Camp Creek	Camp Creek	Boogan

South Johnstone is a rural town and locality in the Cassowary Coast Region, Queensland, Australia. In the 2021 census, the locality of South Johnstone had a population of 456 people.

== Geography ==
South Johnstone is in Far North Queensland, approximately 10 kilometres (6 mi) south-west of Innisfail.

=== Climate ===
South Johnstone has a trade wind-influenced tropical rainforest climate (Köppen: Af) with hot, extremely wet summers and warm, somewhat drier winters. The wettest recorded day was 13 January 1981 with 441.0 mm (17.36 in) of rainfall. Extreme temperatures ranged from 42.2 °C (108.0 °F) on 27 November 2018 to 3.3 °C (37.9 °F) on 19 July 1965.

Climate data for South Johnstone (17.61°S 146.00°E) (18 m (59 ft) AMSL) (1920-2025)
Month	Jan	Feb	Mar	Apr	May	Jun	Jul	Aug	Sep	Oct	Nov	Dec	Year
Record high °C (°F)	40.0 (104.0)	40.5 (104.9)	37.6 (99.7)	35.3 (95.5)	32.0 (89.6)	31.0 (87.8)	32.2 (90.0)	32.3 (90.1)	35.0 (95.0)	36.3 (97.3)	42.2 (108.0)	40.4 (104.7)	42.2 (108.0)
Mean daily maximum °C (°F)	31.3 (88.3)	30.8 (87.4)	30.0 (86.0)	28.3 (82.9)	26.3 (79.3)	24.5 (76.1)	24.0 (75.2)	25.3 (77.5)	27.1 (80.8)	29.1 (84.4)	30.5 (86.9)	31.3 (88.3)	28.2 (82.8)
Mean daily minimum °C (°F)	22.7 (72.9)	22.8 (73.0)	22.2 (72.0)	20.6 (69.1)	18.5 (65.3)	16.1 (61.0)	15.3 (59.5)	15.6 (60.1)	16.9 (62.4)	19.0 (66.2)	20.7 (69.3)	22.0 (71.6)	19.4 (66.9)
Record low °C (°F)	14.4 (57.9)	16.0 (60.8)	15.0 (59.0)	11.7 (53.1)	7.4 (45.3)	5.4 (41.7)	3.3 (37.9)	6.8 (44.2)	7.3 (45.1)	9.6 (49.3)	10.8 (51.4)	14.9 (58.8)	3.3 (37.9)
Average precipitation mm (inches)	525.7 (20.70)	569.3 (22.41)	608.8 (23.97)	390.3 (15.37)	268.4 (10.57)	153.3 (6.04)	114.9 (4.52)	91.4 (3.60)	87.6 (3.45)	94.4 (3.72)	140.8 (5.54)	275.8 (10.86)	3,308.1 (130.24)
Average precipitation days (≥ 0.2 mm)	18.8	19.5	21.2	20.4	18.9	15.3	14.7	12.9	11.6	10.8	11.7	14.7	190.5
Average afternoon relative humidity (%)	70	73	71	72	68	69	63	60	58	58	62	66	66
Average dew point °C (°F)	23.2 (73.8)	23.7 (74.7)	22.2 (72.0)	21.0 (69.8)	18.4 (65.1)	17.0 (62.6)	15.2 (59.4)	15.5 (59.9)	16.7 (62.1)	18.3 (64.9)	20.4 (68.7)	22.3 (72.1)	19.5 (67.1)
Mean monthly sunshine hours	201.5	155.4	170.5	165.0	142.6	165.0	173.6	198.4	222.0	254.2	240.0	229.4	2,317.6
Percentage possible sunshine	50	43	45	47	41	50	50	55	62	66	62	56	52
Source: Bureau of Meteorology (1920-2025)

== History ==
South Johnstone Sugar Mill opened in 1915.

South Johnstone State School was opened on 5 June 1916. The school celebrated its 100th anniversary in 2016.

St Rita's Catholic School was established on 1 February 1932 by the Sisters of the Good Samaritan.

The South Johnstone parish of the Roman Catholic Diocese of Cairns was established in 1947. It is now merged with the Innisfail and Mourilyian parishes.

St Saviour's Anglican Church was designed by Arthur Brown and constructed by local builder Mose Romano using masonry in 1939. It was officially opened on Sunday 2 September 1939 by Bishop John Feetham. It was at 26 Hynes Street (17.597861°S 145.994°E) and has now closed.

The town was originally called Basilisk until 1954, when it was officially renamed South Johnstone after the South Johnstone River. The river was named by George Elphinstone Dalrymple in honour of Robert Johnstone who accompanied him on an expedition in 1873. The name Basilisk is now used for a nearby locality.

St Rita's Roman Catholic Church was built from brick in 1970.

== Demographics ==
In the 2011 census, the town of South Johnstone had a population of 411 people.

In the 2016 census, the locality of South Johnstone had a population of 413 people.

In the 2021 census, the locality of South Johnstone had a population of 456 people.

== Heritage listings ==
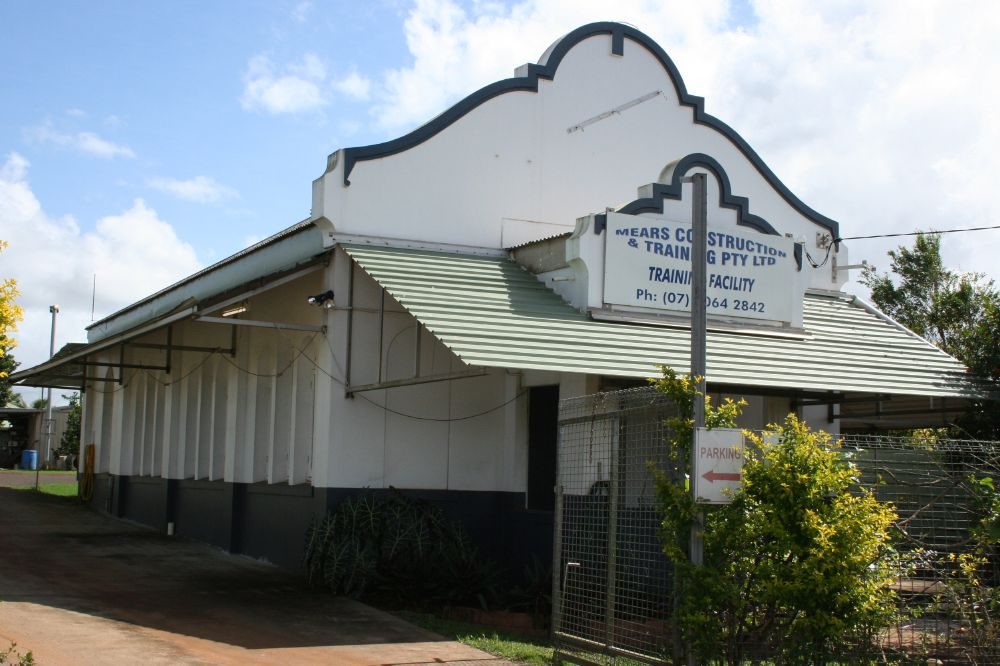
St Saviour's Anglican Church, South Johnstone, 2009

South Johnstone has a number of heritage-listed sites, including:

- 26 Hynes Street: St Saviour's Anglican Church

== Economy ==
South Johnstone Sugar Mill is operated by MSF Sugar. It is on Innisfail Japoon Road (17.6042°S 145.9879°E).

== Education ==
South Johnstone State School is a government primary (Prep-6) school for boys and girls at East Avenue (corner of North Avenue, 17.5934°S 145.9999°E). In 2017, the school had an enrolment of 31 students with 3 teachers and 6 non-teaching staff (3 full-time equivalent).

St Rita's School is a Catholic primary (Prep-6) school for boys and girls at 8 Green Street (17.5988°S 145.9963°E). In 2017, the school had an enrolment of 117 students with 15 teachers (10 full-time equivalent) and 13 non-teaching staff (5 full-time equivalent).

There are no secondary schools in South Johnstone. The nearest government secondary school is Innisfail State College in East Innisfail.

== Amenities ==
St Rita's Catholic Church is at 5 Green Street (17.5991°S 145.9956°E). It is within the Innisfail Parish of the Roman Catholic Diocese of Cairns.

South Johnsone has a number of facilities:

- South Johnstone Post Office (17.5987°S 145.9956°E).
- South Johnstone Police Station (17.6035°S 145.9921°E)
- South Johnstone Ambulance Station(17.6037°S 145.9921°E)

== See also ==
- List of tramways in Queensland
