= List of Symplocos species =

Symplocos is a genus of plants in the family Symplocaceae. As of July 2026, Plants of the World Online recognises the following 412 species.

== A-B ==
- Symplocos abietorum Standl. & Steyerm.
- Symplocos abrahamiana R.Jagad., Gangapr. & S.P.Mathew
- Symplocos acananensis Steyerm.
- Symplocos acuminata (Blume) Miq.
- Symplocos adenophylla Wall. ex G.Don
- Symplocos adenopus Hance
- Symplocos altissima Brand
- Symplocos ambangensis Noot.
- Symplocos amplifolia Brand
- Symplocos ampulliformis C.T.White
- Symplocos anamallayana Bedd.
- Symplocos andicola B.Ståhl
- Symplocos angulata Brand
- Symplocos annamensis Noot.
- Symplocos anomala Brand
- Symplocos apiciflora B.Ståhl
- Symplocos aprilis Brand
- Symplocos araioura Merr.
- Symplocos arborea (Vieill.) Brongn. & Gris
- Symplocos arbutifolia Casar.
- Symplocos arechea L'Hér.
- Symplocos argenna Brand
- Symplocos atjehensis Noot.
- Symplocos atlantica Aranha
- Symplocos atriolivacea Merr. & Chun ex H.L.Li
- Symplocos austin-smithii Standl.
- Symplocos austromexicana Almeda
- Symplocos austrosinensis Hand.-Mazz.
- Symplocos authilingomii A.N.Henry & Gopalan
- Symplocos badia B.Ståhl
- Symplocos baehnii J.F.Macbr.
- Symplocos baeuerlenii R.T.Baker
- Symplocos banaensis Guillaumin
- Symplocos baracoensis P.W.Fritsch & Almeda
- Symplocos barisanica Noot.
- Symplocos barringtoniifolia Brand
- Symplocos batakensis Noot.
- Symplocos blancae B.Ståhl
- Symplocos bogotensis Brand
- Symplocos bolivarana Aristeg.
- Symplocos bombycina B.Ståhl
- Symplocos boninensis Rehder & E.H.Wilson
- Symplocos boonjee Jessup
- Symplocos borneensis Brand
- Symplocos brachybotrys Merr.
- Symplocos bractealis Thwaites
- Symplocos brandisii Koord. & Valeton
- Symplocos breedlovei Lundell
- Symplocos bullata Jessup
- Symplocos buxifolia Stapf
- Symplocos buxifolioides K.G.Pearce

== C ==
- Symplocos caerulescens (Vieill.) Brongn. & Gris
- Symplocos calycodactylos Brand
- Symplocos cambodiana (Pierre) Hallier f.
- Symplocos candelabrum Brand
- Symplocos canescens B.Ståhl
- Symplocos carmencitae B.Ståhl
- Symplocos caudata Wall. ex G.Don
- Symplocos celastrifolia Griff. ex C.B.Clarke
- Symplocos celastrinea Mart. ex Miq.
- Symplocos cerasifolia Wall. ex DC.
- Symplocos cernua Bonpl.
- Symplocos chaoanensis F.G.Wang & H.G.Ye
- Symplocos chimantensis Steyerm. & Maguire
- Symplocos chloroleuca B.Ståhl
- Symplocos ciponimoides Griseb.
- Symplocos citrea Lex.
- Symplocos clethrifolia B.Ståhl
- Symplocos coccinea Bonpl.
- Symplocos cochinchinensis (Lour.) S.Moore
- Symplocos colombonensis Noot.
- Symplocos colorata Brand
- Symplocos columbuli Noot.
- Symplocos complanata Brand
- Symplocos composiracemosa Noot.
- Symplocos condorensis B.Ståhl
- Symplocos cordifolia Thwaites
- Symplocos coreana (H.Lév.) Ohwi
- Symplocos coriacea A.DC.
- Symplocos coronata Thwaites
- Symplocos corymboclados Brand
- Symplocos costaricana Hemsl.
- Symplocos costata (Blume) Choisy ex Zoll.
- Symplocos costatifructa Noot.
- Symplocos crassilimba Merr.
- Symplocos crassipes C.B.Clarke
- Symplocos crassiramifera Noot.
- Symplocos crassulacea B.Ståhl
- Symplocos cubensis Griseb.
- Symplocos culminicola Standl. & Steyerm.
- Symplocos cundinamarcensis B.Ståhl
- Symplocos cuneata Thwaites
- Symplocos cuscoensis B.Ståhl
- Symplocos cyanocarpa C.T.White
- Symplocos cylindracea Noot.

== D-G ==
- Symplocos dasyphylla Brand
- Symplocos debilis B.Ståhl
- Symplocos decorticans B.Ståhl
- Symplocos deflexa Stapf
- Symplocos denticulata B.Ståhl
- Symplocos disepala Guillaumin
- Symplocos diversifolia Brand
- Symplocos dolichopoda B.Ståhl
- Symplocos dolichotricha Merr.
- Symplocos domingensis Urb.
- Symplocos dryophila C.B.Clarke
- Symplocos ecuadorensis Little
- Symplocos ecuadorica Doweld
- Symplocos elegans Thwaites
- Symplocos elliptica L.M.Kelly & Almeda
- Symplocos estrellensis Casar.
- Symplocos euryoides Hand.-Mazz.
- Symplocos excelsa L.O.Williams
- Symplocos excoriata B.Ståhl
- Symplocos extraaxillaris Brand
- Symplocos falcata Brand
- Symplocos fasciculata Zoll.
- Symplocos ferruginea Roxb.
- Symplocos filipes Noot.
- Symplocos fimbriata B.Ståhl
- Symplocos flavescens Brand
- Symplocos flos-pilosa Aristeg.
- Symplocos flosfragrans Chaparro
- Symplocos foliosa Wight
- Symplocos fordii Hance
- Symplocos fragilis B.Ståhl
- Symplocos fukienensis Y.Ling
- Symplocos fuliginosa B.Ståhl
- Symplocos fuscata B.Ståhl
- Symplocos gambliana Brand
- Symplocos gigantifolia Noot.
- Symplocos gittinsii (Noot.) Jessup
- Symplocos glaberrima Gontsch.
- Symplocos glabriramifera Noot.
- Symplocos glandulifera Brand
- Symplocos glandulosomarginata Hoehne
- Symplocos glauca (Thunb.) Koidz.
- Symplocos glaziovii Brand
- Symplocos globulifera B.Ståhl
- Symplocos glomerata King ex C.B.Clarke
- Symplocos golondrinae B.Ståhl
- Symplocos goodeniacea Noot.
- Symplocos gracilis Brongn. & Gris
- Symplocos graniticola Jessup
- Symplocos groffii Merr.
- Symplocos guacamayensis B.Ståhl
- Symplocos guadeloupensis Krug & Urb.
- Symplocos guanwuensis S.S.Ying
- Symplocos guianensis (Aubl.) Gürke
- Symplocos guillauminii Merr.

== H-L ==
- Symplocos hainanensis Merr. & Chun ex H.L.Li
- Symplocos harroldii Jessup
- Symplocos hartwegii A.DC.
- Symplocos hayesii C.T.White & W.D.Francis
- Symplocos heishanensis Hayata
- Symplocos henryi Brand
- Symplocos henschelii (Moritzi) Benth. ex C.B.Clarke
- Symplocos herzogii Sleumer
- Symplocos hiemalis Lingelsh.
- Symplocos hintonii Lundell
- Symplocos hongiaoensis Nagam. & Tagane
- Symplocos hookeri C.B.Clarke
- Symplocos hottae Nagam.
- Symplocos hotteana Urb. & Ekman
- Symplocos huegeliana Brand
- Symplocos huythacae Varón-Cast. & Jara
- Symplocos hylandii Noot.
- Symplocos iliaspaiensis Noot.
- Symplocos imperialis Brand
- Symplocos incahuasensis Sagást. & M.O.Dillon
- Symplocos incrassata Aranha
- Symplocos inopinata Aranha
- Symplocos insignis Brand
- Symplocos insolita Aranha, P.W.Fritsch & Almeda
- Symplocos interrupta Brand
- Symplocos itatiaiae Wawra
- Symplocos jauaensis Steyerm. & Maguire
- Symplocos johniana Stapf
- Symplocos juiyenensis C.C.Wang & C.H.Ou
- Symplocos junghuhnii Koord.
- Symplocos jurgensenii Hemsl.
- Symplocos kawakamii Hayata
- Symplocos kemiriensis Nagam.
- Symplocos khasiana Brand
- Symplocos kleinii Aranha
- Symplocos koidzumiana Tatew. & B.Yoshim.
- Symplocos kothayarensis Sundaresan, Jothi, S.Rajkumar & Manickam
- Symplocos kurgensis C.B.Clarke
- Symplocos laeteviridis Stapf
- Symplocos lanata Krug & Urb.
- Symplocos lancifolia Siebold & Zucc.
- Symplocos lasseri Steyerm.
- Symplocos latifolia Krug & Urb.
- Symplocos laxiflora Benth.
- Symplocos ledermannii Brand
- Symplocos lehmannii Brand
- Symplocos leiostachya Kurz
- Symplocos leochaii P.Chai
- Symplocos leonis Britton & P.Wilson
- Symplocos leucantha Kurz
- Symplocos leucocarpa Brand
- Symplocos lilacina Brand
- Symplocos limoncillo Bonpl.
- Symplocos limonensis B.Ståhl, C.Ulloa & Minga
- Symplocos lindeniana Krug & Urb.
- Symplocos liukiuensis Matsum.
- Symplocos longifolia H.R.Fletcher
- Symplocos longipes Lundell
- Symplocos lucida Wall. ex G.Don
- Symplocos lugubris Brand
- Symplocos lutescens Brand

== M-N ==
- Symplocos macrocarpa Wight ex C.B.Clarke
- Symplocos macrophylla Wall. ex DC.
- Symplocos magdalenae B.Ståhl
- Symplocos maliliensis Noot.
- Symplocos mapiriensis Brand
- Symplocos martinicensis Jacq.
- Symplocos megalocarpa H.R.Fletcher
- Symplocos melanochroa Sleumer
- Symplocos menglianensis Y.Y.Qian
- Symplocos mezii Szyszył.
- Symplocos micrantha Krug & Urb.
- Symplocos microcalyx Hayata
- Symplocos microphylla Wight
- Symplocos microstyla Aranha, P.W.Fritsch & Almeda
- Symplocos migoi Nagam.
- Symplocos minima Aranha
- Symplocos moaensis Borhidi
- Symplocos mohananii J.Stephan, R.Akhil & P.W.Fritsch
- Symplocos monantha Wight
- Symplocos montana (Vieill.) Brongn. & Gris
- Symplocos morii Almeda & L.M.Kelly
- Symplocos mucronata Bonpl.
- Symplocos multibracteata Noot.
- Symplocos multipes Brand
- Symplocos myrtacea Siebold & Zucc.
- Symplocos nairii A.N.Henry, Gopalan & Swamin.
- Symplocos nakaharae (Hayata) Masam.
- Symplocos namboodiriana (Sivad. & N.Mohanan) J.Stephan, P.W.Fritsch & N.Mohanan
- Symplocos nana Brand
- Symplocos naniflora L.M.Kelly & Almeda
- Symplocos neblinae Maguire & Steyerm.
- Symplocos neei B.Ståhl
- Symplocos neglecta Brand
- Symplocos neillii B.Ståhl
- Symplocos neocaledonica (Vieill.) Noot.
- Symplocos nicolsonii R.Jagad., Gangapr., S.P.Mathew, E.S.S.Kumar & J.Stephan
- Symplocos nigridentata L.M.Kelly & Almeda
- Symplocos nitens (Pohl) Benth.
- Symplocos nitidiflora Brand
- Symplocos nivalis Linden ex Brand
- Symplocos nivea Brand
- Symplocos nokoensis (Hayata) Kaneh.
- Symplocos nuda Bonpl.

== O-P ==
- Symplocos oblongifolia Casar.
- Symplocos obovatifolia Merr.
- Symplocos obtusa Wall. ex G.Don
- Symplocos occulta Aranha
- Symplocos octopetala Sw.
- Symplocos odoratissima (Blume) Choisy ex Zoll.
- Symplocos oligandra Bedd.
- Symplocos olivacea Merr.
- Symplocos ophirensis C.B.Clarke
- Symplocos oranjeensis Brand
- Symplocos oreophila Almeda
- Symplocos oresbia Jessup
- Symplocos organensis Brand
- Symplocos ovalis C.Wright ex Griseb.
- Symplocos ovata B.Ståhl
- Symplocos ovatilobata Noot.
- Symplocos oxyphylla Wall. ex DC.
- Symplocos pachycarpa L.M.Kelly & Almeda
- Symplocos panamensis McPherson
- Symplocos paniculata (Thunb.) Miq.
- Symplocos paniensis Pillon & Noot.
- Symplocos parvibracteata J.Stephan, P.W.Fritsch & N.Mohanan
- Symplocos parvifolia Benth.
- Symplocos patazensis Mansf.
- Symplocos paucinervia Noot.
- Symplocos paucistaminea F.Muell. & F.M.Bailey
- Symplocos pealii King ex Das
- Symplocos pedunculata Noot.
- Symplocos pendula Wight
- Symplocos pentandra (Mattos) Occhioni ex Aranha
- Symplocos pergracilis (Nakai) T.Yamaz.
- Symplocos peruviana (Szyszył.) Brand
- Symplocos phaeoneura B.Ståhl
- Symplocos pichindensis Cuatrec.
- Symplocos pilosa Rehder
- Symplocos pilosiuscula Brand
- Symplocos pittieriana Steyerm.
- Symplocos platyphylla (Pohl) Benth.
- Symplocos pluribracteata B.Ståhl
- Symplocos pochinii C.E.C.Fisch.
- Symplocos poilanei Guillaumin
- Symplocos polyandra (Blanco) Brand
- Symplocos polyphylla B.Ståhl
- Symplocos povedae Almeda
- Symplocos pseudobarberina Gontsch.
- Symplocos psiloclada B.Ståhl
- Symplocos puberula Jessup
- Symplocos pubescens Klotzsch ex Benth.
- Symplocos pulchra Wight
- Symplocos pulvinata Noot.
- Symplocos pustulosa Aranha
- Symplocos pycnantha Hemsl.
- Symplocos pycnobotrya Mart. ex Miq.
- Symplocos pycnophylla Sleumer
- Symplocos pyriflora Ridl.
- Symplocos pyrifolia Wall. ex G.Don

== Q-S ==
- Symplocos quindiuensis Brand
- Symplocos quitensis Brand
- Symplocos racemosa Roxb.
- Symplocos ramosissima Wall. ex G.Don
- Symplocos ramuliflora B.Ståhl
- Symplocos rayae Noot.
- Symplocos reflexa A.DC.
- Symplocos retusa Kriebel, J.A.González & Alfaro
- Symplocos revoluta (Mart.) Casar.
- Symplocos rhamnifolia A.DC.
- Symplocos rhomboidea B.Ståhl
- Symplocos riangensis Noot.
- Symplocos rigidissima Brand
- Symplocos rimbachii B.Ståhl
- Symplocos rimosa B.Ståhl
- Symplocos rizzinii Occhioni
- Symplocos robinfosteri B.Ståhl
- Symplocos robinsonii Ridl.
- Symplocos robusta B.Ståhl
- Symplocos rubiginosa Wall. ex A.DC.
- Symplocos salicifolia Griseb.
- Symplocos salicoides Noot.
- Symplocos sanaensis Masam. & Syozi
- Symplocos sandemanii B.Ståhl
- Symplocos sandiae Brand
- Symplocos sararensis Cuatrec.
- Symplocos sawafutagi Nagam.
- Symplocos saxatilis Aranha, P.W.Fritsch & Almeda
- Symplocos scabra J.F.Macbr.
- Symplocos schiedeana Schltdl.
- Symplocos schomburgkii Klotzsch ex Brand
- Symplocos serratifolia B.Ståhl
- Symplocos serrulata Bonpl.
- Symplocos setchuensis Brand
- Symplocos shilanensis Y.C.Liu & F.Y.Lu
- Symplocos silverstonei B.Ståhl
- Symplocos singuliflora Guillaumin
- Symplocos sisparensis B.Karthik, Murug., Anusuba, Premk. & Tharani
- Symplocos sonoharae Koidz.
- Symplocos sordida Guillaumin
- Symplocos sousae Almeda
- Symplocos speciosa Hemsl.
- Symplocos spectabilis Brand
- Symplocos spruceana (Miers) Gürke
- Symplocos stawellii F.Muell.
- Symplocos stellaris Brand
- Symplocos striata Kriebel & N.Zamora
- Symplocos suaveolens Klotzsch ex Brand
- Symplocos subandina B.Ståhl
- Symplocos subcuneata (Herzog) B.Ståhl
- Symplocos subintegra Chatterjee
- Symplocos subsecunda Brand
- Symplocos sukoei C.E.C.Fisch.
- Symplocos sulcinervia B.Ståhl
- Symplocos sumatrana Brand
- Symplocos sumuntia Buch.-Ham. ex D.Don

== T-Z ==
- Symplocos tacanensis Lundell
- Symplocos taiwanensis S.S.Ying
- Symplocos tamana Steyerm.
- Symplocos tanakae Matsum.
- Symplocos tanakana Nakai
- Symplocos tenuifolia Brand
- Symplocos tetragona Y.F.Wu
- Symplocos tetrandra (Mart.) Mart.
- Symplocos theifolia D.Don
- Symplocos theiformis (L.f.) Oken
- Symplocos theophrastifolia Siebold & Zucc.
- Symplocos thwaitesii F.Muell.
- Symplocos tinctoria (L.) L'Hér.
- Symplocos trachycarpos Brand
- Symplocos trianae Brand
- Symplocos tribracteolata Almeda
- Symplocos trichocarpa B.Ståhl
- Symplocos trichomarginalis Noot.
- Symplocos tricoccata Noot.
- Symplocos trisepala Merr.
- Symplocos truncata B.Ståhl
- Symplocos turrilliana A.C.Sm.
- Symplocos ulei Brand
- Symplocos ulotricha Y.Ling
- Symplocos umbellata Brand
- Symplocos unicarpa Noot.
- Symplocos uniflora (Pohl) Benth.
- Symplocos urbaniana Brand
- Symplocos vacciniifolia H.S.Chen & H.G.Ye
- Symplocos vanderwerffii B.Ståhl
- Symplocos vatteri Standl. & Steyerm.
- Symplocos venulosa Cuatrec.
- Symplocos verrucisurcula B.Ståhl
- Symplocos verticillifolia Noot.
- Symplocos vidalii Rolfe
- Symplocos vinosodentata H.Lév.
- Symplocos violacea Brand
- Symplocos viridissima Brand
- Symplocos weberbaueri Brand
- Symplocos whitfordii Brand
- Symplocos wikstroemiifolia Hayata
- Symplocos wooroonooran Jessup
- Symplocos wynadense (Kuntze) Noot.
- Symplocos yangchunensis H.G.Ye & F.W.Xing
- Symplocos yapacanensis Steyerm.
- Symplocos zizyphoides Stapf
