= Symplocos buxifolioides =

Conservation status
- Vulnerable (IUCN 3.1)

Scientific classification
- Kingdom: Plantae
- Clade: Embryophytes
- Clade: Tracheophytes
- Clade: Spermatophytes
- Clade: Angiosperms
- Clade: Eudicots
- Clade: Asterids
- Order: Ericales
- Family: Symplocaceae
- Genus: Symplocos
- Species: S. buxifolioides

Binomial name
- Symplocos buxifolioides K.G.Pearce

Species of tree

Symplocos buxifolioides is a tree in the family Symplocaceae, native to Borneo. The specific epithet buxifolioides refers to the species' resemblance to Symplocos buxifolia.

== Description ==
Symplocos buxifolioides grows up to 10 metres (33 ft) tall, with a trunk diameter of up to 10 cm (4 in). The curved twigs are brown to black. The leathery leaves are elliptic to ovate and measure up to 4.5 cm (2 in) long. The inflorescences feature racemes bearing one to three white flowers.

== Distribution and habitat ==
Symplocos buxifolioides is endemic to Borneo, where it is known only from Mount Kinabalu in Sabah. Its habitat is montane forests, at elevations of 2,400–3,660 m (8,000–12,000 ft).

== Conservation ==
Symplocos buxifolioides has been assessed as vulnerable on the IUCN Red List. With its very small population, extreme rainfall and/or landslides could push the species towards critical endangerment. Being in Kinabalu Park affords the species a level of protection.
