= Symplocos colombonensis =

Scientific classification
- Kingdom: Plantae
- Clade: Embryophytes
- Clade: Tracheophytes
- Clade: Spermatophytes
- Clade: Angiosperms
- Clade: Eudicots
- Clade: Asterids
- Order: Ericales
- Family: Symplocaceae
- Genus: Symplocos
- Species: S. colombonensis

Binomial name
- Symplocos colombonensis Noot.

Species of flowering plant

Symplocos colombonensis is a plant in the family Symplocaceae, native to Borneo. It is named for the Colombon River in Sabah.

== Description ==
Symplocos colombonensis grows as a shrub or tree up to 10 metres (33 ft) tall. The brown twigs have a zig-zag shape. The leaves are ovate and measure up to 9 cm (4 in) long. The inflorescences feature racemes of three flowers.

== Distribution and habitat ==
Symplocos colombonensis is endemic to Borneo, where it is confined to Mount Kinabalu in Sabah. Its habitat is montane forests, at elevations of 2,100–3,100 m (7,000–10,000 ft).
