= Symplocos cerasifolia =

Conservation status
- Least Concern (IUCN 3.1)

Scientific classification
- Kingdom: Plantae
- Clade: Embryophytes
- Clade: Tracheophytes
- Clade: Spermatophytes
- Clade: Angiosperms
- Clade: Eudicots
- Clade: Asterids
- Order: Ericales
- Family: Symplocaceae
- Genus: Symplocos
- Species: S. cerasifolia

Binomial name
- Symplocos cerasifolia Wall. ex DC.

Species of flowering plant

Symplocos cerasifolia is a plant in the family Symplocaceae, native to Southeast Asia. The specific epithet cerasifolia refers to the leaves' resemblance to those of a cherry tree (Latin: cerasus).

== Description ==
Symplocos cerasifolia grows as a tree up to 20 metres (70 ft) tall, with a trunk diameter of up to 21 cm (8 in). The smooth bark is brown or grey. The leaves are obovate to elliptic and measure up to 17 cm (7 in) long, occasionally 22 cm (9 in). The inflorescences bear 10, sometimes 15, white flowers.

== Distribution and habitat ==
Symplocos cerasifolia is native to Southeast Asia: to Thailand, Peninsular Malaysia, Sumatra, Borneo and New Guinea. Its habitat is in kerangas, dipterocarp and montane forests, at elevations to 1,000 m (3,300 ft).
