= Symplocos ophirensis =

Conservation status
- Least Concern (IUCN 3.1)

Scientific classification
- Kingdom: Plantae
- Clade: Tracheophytes
- Clade: Angiosperms
- Clade: Eudicots
- Clade: Asterids
- Order: Ericales
- Family: Symplocaceae
- Genus: Symplocos
- Species: S. ophirensis

Binomial name
- Symplocos ophirensis C.B.Clarke

Species of flowering plant

Symplocos ophirensis is a tree in the family Symplocaceae, native to tropical Asia.

== Description ==
Symplocos ophirensis grows up to 30 m (100 ft) tall, with a trunk diameter of up to 33 cm (13 in). The smooth bark may be grey or brown. The leaves, of varying shapes, measure up to 18 cm (7 in) long. The inflorescences feature racemes or spikes, each of up to ten yellow to white flowers.

== Taxonomy ==
Symplocos ophirensis was described by British botanist Charles Baron Clarke in 1882 in The flora of British India by Joseph Dalton Hooker. The lectotype was collected near the summit of Mount Ophir (now Mount Ledang) in Johor, Malaysia. The species is named for Mount Ophir.

== Distribution and habitat ==
Symplocos ophirensis is native to Peninsular Malaysia, Sumatra, Borneo, the Philippines and Sulawesi. Its habitat is mixed dipterocarp forest and montane forest (including kerangas), at elevations to 1,700 m (5,600 ft), generally above 1,200 m (4,000 ft).

== Infraspecifics ==
A number of subspecies and varieties of Symplocos ophirensis are recognised:

- Symplocos ophirensis subsp. cumingiana (Brand) Noot.
- Symplocos ophirensis var. densireticulata Noot.
- Symplocos ophirensis var. kaliensis B.C.Stone
- Symplocos ophirensis var. lingaensis Noot.
- Symplocos ophirensis subsp. ophirensis
- Symplocos ophirensis var. pachyphylla (Merr.) Noot.
- Symplocos ophirensis subsp. perakensis (King & Gamble) Noot.
- Symplocos ophirensis var. sumatrana Noot.
