= Symplocos laeteviridis =

Conservation status
- Least Concern (IUCN 3.1)

Scientific classification
- Kingdom: Plantae
- Clade: Embryophytes
- Clade: Tracheophytes
- Clade: Spermatophytes
- Clade: Angiosperms
- Clade: Eudicots
- Clade: Asterids
- Order: Ericales
- Family: Symplocaceae
- Genus: Symplocos
- Species: S. laeteviridis

Binomial name
- Symplocos laeteviridis Stapf

Species of flowering plant

Symplocos laeteviridis is a plant in the family Symplocaceae, native to tropical Asia. The specific epithet laeteviridis means 'bright green' and refers to the leaves.

== Description ==
Symplocos laeteviridis grows as a shrub or tree up to 23 metres (75 ft) tall, with a trunk diameter of up to 20 cm (8 in). The smooth bark may be green, grey or brown. The leaves, of varying shapes, measure up to 13.5 cm (5 in) long.

== Distribution and habitat ==
Symplocos laeteviridis is native to Peninsular Malaysia, Sumatra, Borneo and Sulawesi. Its habitat is mixed dipterocarp forest and montane forest (including kerangas), at elevations to 2,900 m (9,500 ft), generally above 600 m (2,000 ft).

== Varieties ==
Numerous varieties of Symplocos laeteviridis are recognised:

- Symplocos laeteviridis var. alabensis K.G.Pearce – Sabah
- Symplocos laeteviridis var. alternifolia Noot. – Sabah
- Symplocos laeteviridis var. basirotunda Noot. – Borneo
- Symplocos laeteviridis var. kinabaluensis (Heine) Noot. – Mount Kinabalu (Sabah)
- Symplocos laeteviridis var. laeteviridis – Peninsular Malaysia, Sumatra, Borneo, Sulawesi
- Symplocos laeteviridis var. mjoebergii (Merr.) Noot. – Borneo
- Symplocos laeteviridis var. pauciflora Noot. – Borneo
- Symplocos laeteviridis var. velutinosa Noot. – Sabah, Sarawak
