= Symplocos cyanocarpa =

- Herbarium specimen

Conservation status
- Least Concern (IUCN 3.1)

Scientific classification
- Kingdom: Plantae
- Clade: Tracheophytes
- Clade: Angiosperms
- Clade: Eudicots
- Clade: Asterids
- Order: Ericales
- Family: Symplocaceae
- Genus: Symplocos
- Species: S. cyanocarpa

Binomial name
- Symplocos cyanocarpa C.T.White

Species of flowering plant

Symplocos cyanocarpa is a species of plant in the family Symplocaceae, endemic to northeast Queensland, Australia. It is a rainforest shrub, first described in 1936, and it has a conservation status of least concern.

== Description ==
Symplocos cyanocarpa is a shrub up to 5 m (16 ft) tall. Leaves are mostly without hairs and are obovate to elliptic. They are between 8 and 23 cm (3 and 9 in) long and 3 and 7 cm (1.2 and 2.8 in) wide, with 7 to 12 pairs of lateral veins branching from the midrib.

Sessile clusters of up to ten flowers are produced from the leaf axils or on the twigs. They have are five white, pink or purple petals about 4 mm (0.16 in) long, and 15 to 30 stamens about 3 mm (0.12 in) long. The fruit is a blue or purple drupe up to 2.5 cm (1.0 in) long and 1.4 cm (0.6 in) wide, containing a single brown seed.

== Taxonomy ==
This species was first described by Cyril Tenison White in 1935 (published in 1936), based on material collected from the Mossman River near Port Douglas.

Two varieties are recognised:

- Symplocos cyanocarpa var. cyanocarpa
- Symplocos cyanocarpa var. pilosa

== Conservation ==
This species was assessed by the International Union for Conservation of Nature (IUCN) in 2023 and found to be of least concern. It is also rated as least concern by the Queensland Government under its Nature Conservation Act.

In its statement, the IUCN cites a large population and the lack of any current or perceived future threats as the basis for its assessment.

== Gallery ==
Foliage

Flowers and flower buds

Fruit
