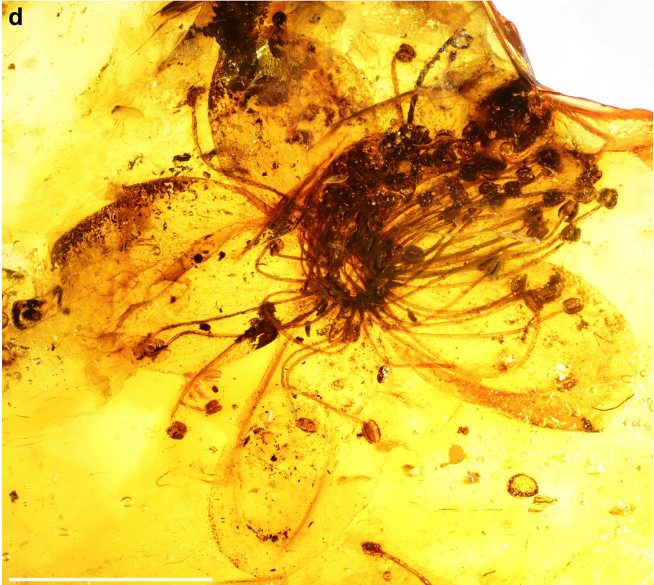
- Holotype, BGR X4088

Scientific classification
- Kingdom: Plantae
- Clade: Embryophytes
- Clade: Tracheophytes
- Clade: Angiosperms
- Clade: Eudicots
- Clade: Asterids
- Order: Ericales
- Family: Symplocaceae
- Genus: Symplocos
- Species: †S. kowalewskii

Binomial name
- †Symplocos kowalewskii (Casp.) Sadowski et Hofmann

Synonyms
- Stewartia kowalewskii Casp. (1872)

= Symplocos kowalewskii =

Symplocos kowalewskii Temporal range: 38–34 Ma Late Eocene

Extinct species of flowering plant

Symplocos kowalewskii is an extinct species of flowering plant known through a single flower preserved in amber. It belongs to the genus Symplocos within the family Symplocaceae.

== Description ==
The pentamerous flower of Symplocos kowalewskii is 25–28 mm wide. The corolla is fused basally, and the exterior surface bears trichomes. Most pollen grains are tricolporate.

== Taxonomy ==
Within the genus Symplocos it may be placed in the subgenus Symplocos.

== Ecology ==
Symplocos kowalewskii is thought to have occurred in ancient forested habitats, possibly in addition to Quasisequoia swamps. The extant, Asian relatives grow in montane, humid forests.

== Temporal range ==
The fossilized specimen dates back to the late Eocene.

== Distribution ==
The fossilized specimen originates from Baltic amber. It likely was found in the Samland Peninsula.

== Scientific significance ==
The preserved specimen is unusually large. It is about three times as big as the usual preserved flowers found in amber, and this makes the preserved Symplocos kowalewskii specimen unique, as it is the largest known preserved flower in amber. The rarity of such specimens may be explained by the physical properties of the tree sap. Also, it is thought that larger specimens do not stick well to the sap. This fossil can help reconstruct the ancient flora and climate.
