= Symplocos deflexa =

Conservation status
- Least Concern (IUCN 3.1)

Scientific classification
- Kingdom: Plantae
- Clade: Embryophytes
- Clade: Tracheophytes
- Clade: Spermatophytes
- Clade: Angiosperms
- Clade: Eudicots
- Clade: Asterids
- Order: Ericales
- Family: Symplocaceae
- Genus: Symplocos
- Species: S. deflexa

Binomial name
- Symplocos deflexa Stapf

Species of tree

Symplocos deflexa is a tree in the family Symplocaceae, native to Borneo. The specific epithet deflexa means 'drooping' and refers to the orientation of the infructescence.

== Description ==
Symplocos deflexa grows up to 6 metres (20 ft) tall, with a stem diameter of up to 8 cm (3 in). The papery leaves are elliptic and measure up to 5 cm (2 in) long. The inflorescences feature racemes, each of up to six fragrant flowers.

== Distribution and habitat ==
Symplocos deflexa is endemic to Borneo, where it is confined to areas of Ranau District in Sabah, including Mount Kinabalu and Tenompok Forest Reserve. Its habitat is montane forests, at elevations of 2,300–3,400 m (7,500–11,200 ft).
