= S. tinctoria =

S. tinctoria may refer to:

- Serratula tinctoria, the saw-wort, a plant species native of Europe
- Symplocos tinctoria, the sweetleaf, horse-sugar or yellowwood, a deciduous or evergreen shrub or tree species found in the United States
- Serjania tinctoria, a synonym of Symplocos fasciculata

== See also ==
- Tinctoria
