= Symplocos goodeniacea =

Scientific classification
- Kingdom: Plantae
- Clade: Embryophytes
- Clade: Tracheophytes
- Clade: Spermatophytes
- Clade: Angiosperms
- Clade: Eudicots
- Clade: Asterids
- Order: Ericales
- Family: Symplocaceae
- Genus: Symplocos
- Species: S. goodeniacea

Binomial name
- Symplocos goodeniacea Noot.

Species of tree

Symplocos goodeniacea is a tree in the family Symplocaceae, native to Borneo. It is named for the leaves' resemblance to those of species in the family Goodeniaceae.

== Description ==
Symplocos goodeniacea grows up to 25 metres (80 ft) tall, with a trunk diameter of up to 35 cm (14 in). The brown bark is lenticellate. The leathery leaves, of varying shapes, measure up to 31 cm (12 in) long. The inflorescences bear many white flowers. The pear-shaped fruits, beginning white and ripening purple, measure 1.3 cm (0.5 in) long.

== Distribution and habitat ==
Symplocos goodeniacea is endemic to Borneo. Its habitat is dipterocarp forests, on hilly terrain at elevations to 150 m (500 ft).
