= Symplocos borneensis =

Scientific classification
- Kingdom: Plantae
- Clade: Embryophytes
- Clade: Tracheophytes
- Clade: Spermatophytes
- Clade: Angiosperms
- Clade: Eudicots
- Clade: Asterids
- Order: Ericales
- Family: Symplocaceae
- Genus: Symplocos
- Species: S. borneensis

Binomial name
- Symplocos borneensis Brand

Species of flowering plant

Symplocos borneensis is a plant in the family Symplocaceae, native to Borneo. The specific epithet borneensis refers to the species' presence on the island.

== Description ==
Symplocos borneensis has straight, grooved twigs. The leaves are elliptic and measure up to 8 centimetres (3 in) long. The inflorescences feature racemes bearing at least seven flowers.

== Distribution and habitat ==
Symplocos borneensis is endemic to Borneo. Its habitat is lowland dipterocarp forests.
