= Symplocos costatifructa =

Scientific classification
- Kingdom: Plantae
- Clade: Embryophytes
- Clade: Tracheophytes
- Clade: Spermatophytes
- Clade: Angiosperms
- Clade: Eudicots
- Clade: Asterids
- Order: Ericales
- Family: Symplocaceae
- Genus: Symplocos
- Species: S. costatifructa

Binomial name
- Symplocos costatifructa Noot.

Species of tree

Symplocos costatifructa is a tree in the family Symplocaceae, native to Borneo. The specific epithet costatifructa means 'ribbed fruit'.

== Description ==
Symplocos costatifructa grows up to 10 metres (33 ft) tall, with a trunk diameter of up to 10 cm (4 in). The brown bark is smooth. The leathery leaves measure up to 28 cm (11 in) long, occasionally to 35 cm (14 in). The inflorescences feature white flowers. The egg-shaped fruits are white, ribbed and measure up to 3 cm (1.2 in) long.

== Distribution and habitat ==
Symplocos costatifructa is endemic to Borneo, where it is known from Sabah, Sarawak and Brunei. Its habitat is kerangas and mixed dipterocarp forests, at elevations of 50–1,300 m (200–4,300 ft).
