= Symplocos odoratissima =

Scientific classification
- Kingdom: Plantae
- Clade: Embryophytes
- Clade: Tracheophytes
- Clade: Spermatophytes
- Clade: Angiosperms
- Clade: Eudicots
- Clade: Asterids
- Order: Ericales
- Family: Symplocaceae
- Genus: Symplocos
- Species: S. odoratissima

Binomial name
- Symplocos odoratissima (Blume) Choisy ex Zoll.

Synonyms
- Dicalix odoratissimus Blume; Eugenioides odoratissimum (Blume) Kuntze

Species of tree

Symplocos odoratissima is a tree in the family Symplocaceae, native to Southeast Asia. The specific epithet odoratissima means 'most fragrant', referring to the flowers.

== Description ==
Symplocos odoratissima grows up to 28 metres (90 ft) tall, with a stem diameter of up to 50 cm (20 in). The bark is scaly or smooth. Its papery leaves are obovate to elliptic and measure up to 32 cm (13 in) long. The inflorescences bear yellowish-white flowers. The pear-shaped fruits turn blue when ripe and measure up to 2.5 cm (1 in) long.

== Distribution and habitat ==
Symplocos odoratissima is native to much of maritime Southeast Asia, from the east Nicobar Islands to the Maluku Islands and north to the Philippines. Its habitat is dipterocarp forests, often found on swampy terrain by rivers, to elevations of 500 m (1,600 ft).

== Uses ==
The bark of Symplocos odoratissima is used as a dye. In Java, the bark is also locally used in traditional medicines.

== Varieties ==
Plants of the World Online recognises two varieties of Symplocos odoratissima:

- Symplocos odoratissima var. odoratissima – from the Nicobar Islands east to the Maluku Islands and north to the Philippines
- Symplocos odoratissima var. wenzelii (Merr.) Noot. – Borneo and the Philippines
