= S. nivea =

S. nivea may refer to:

- Symplocos nivea, a plant endemic to Malaysia
- Syrmoptera nivea, a synonym for Syrmoptera melanomitra, a butterfly from Africa
- Sympagis nivea and Strobilanthes nivea, synonyms for Strobilanthes tonkinensis, a plant from Southeast Asia

== See also ==
- Nivea (disambiguation)
