= Symplocos tricoccata =

Scientific classification
- Kingdom: Plantae
- Clade: Embryophytes
- Clade: Tracheophytes
- Clade: Spermatophytes
- Clade: Angiosperms
- Clade: Eudicots
- Clade: Asterids
- Order: Ericales
- Family: Symplocaceae
- Genus: Symplocos
- Species: S. tricoccata

Binomial name
- Symplocos tricoccata Noot.

Species of flowering plant

Symplocos tricoccata is a plant in the family Symplocaceae, native to Southeast Asia. The specific epithet tricoccata means 'three-celled fruit'.

== Description ==
Symplocos tricoccata grows as a shrub or small tree up to 10 metres (33 ft) tall, with a stem diameter of up to 15 cm (6 in). The bark is smooth. The leathery leaves are ovate to elliptic and measure up to 29 cm (11 in) long. The inflorescences bear up to eight purple becoming white flowers. The ovoid fruits begin white, turning purple or blue when ripe. The wood is hard and locally used to make handles for knives.

== Distribution and habitat ==
Symplocos tricoccata is native to Peninsular Malaysia and Borneo. Its habitat is forests to elevations of 2,300 m (7,500 ft), sometimes by streams.
