= Symplocos celastrifolia =

Conservation status
- Least Concern (IUCN 3.1)

Scientific classification
- Kingdom: Plantae
- Clade: Embryophytes
- Clade: Tracheophytes
- Clade: Spermatophytes
- Clade: Angiosperms
- Clade: Eudicots
- Clade: Asterids
- Order: Ericales
- Family: Symplocaceae
- Genus: Symplocos
- Species: S. celastrifolia

Binomial name
- Symplocos celastrifolia Griff. ex C.B.Clarke

Synonyms
- Eugenioides celastrifolium Kuntze; Symplocos candicans Brand; Symplocos hutchinsonii Brand; Symplocos nigricans Brand; Symplocos peninsularis Brand

Species of flowering plant

Symplocos celastrifolia is a plant in the family Symplocaceae, native to Southeast Asia. The specific epithet celastrifolia refers to the leaves' resemblance to those of species in the genus Celastrus.

== Description ==
Symplocos celastrifolia grows as a shrub or tree up to 30 metres (100 ft) tall, with a trunk diameter of up to 60 cm (24 in). The grey or brown bark is smooth, becoming scaly. The curved twigs develop lenticels with age. The leaves are elliptic to ovate and measure up to 8 cm (3 in) long, occasionally up to 12 cm (5 in). The inflorescences feature racemes up to 9.5 cm (4 in) long and bear many white flowers. The fruits become purple blue when ripe.

== Distribution and habitat ==
Symplocos celastrifolia is broadly distributed in Southeast Asia: in Thailand, Peninsular Malaysia, Sumatra, Borneo, Sulawesi, the Maluku Islands, New Guinea and the Philippines. Its habitat is lowland forests, sometimes near the sea, or inland by rivers, at elevations to 1,000 m (3,300 ft).
