= Symplocos zizyphoides =

Conservation status
- Least Concern (IUCN 3.1)

Scientific classification
- Kingdom: Plantae
- Clade: Embryophytes
- Clade: Tracheophytes
- Clade: Spermatophytes
- Clade: Angiosperms
- Clade: Eudicots
- Clade: Asterids
- Order: Ericales
- Family: Symplocaceae
- Genus: Symplocos
- Species: S. zizyphoides

Binomial name
- Symplocos zizyphoides Stapf

Synonyms
- Symplocos clementis Merr.

Species of flowering plant

Symplocos zizyphoides is a plant in the family Symplocaceae, native to Borneo. The specific epithet zizyphoides refers to the species' resemblance to those in the genus Ziziphus.

== Description ==
Symplocos zizyphoides grows as a shrub or tree up to 10 metres (33 ft) tall. The brown twigs have a zig-zag shape. The leathery leaves are ovate and measure up to 5.5 cm (2 in) long. The inflorescences feature racemes of up to four white flowers, or flowers may be solitary.

== Distribution and habitat ==
Symplocos zizyphoides is endemic to Borneo, where it is known mainly from Mount Kinabalu in Sabah. Its habitat is montane forests, at elevations of 1,500–3,700 m (5,000–12,000 ft).
