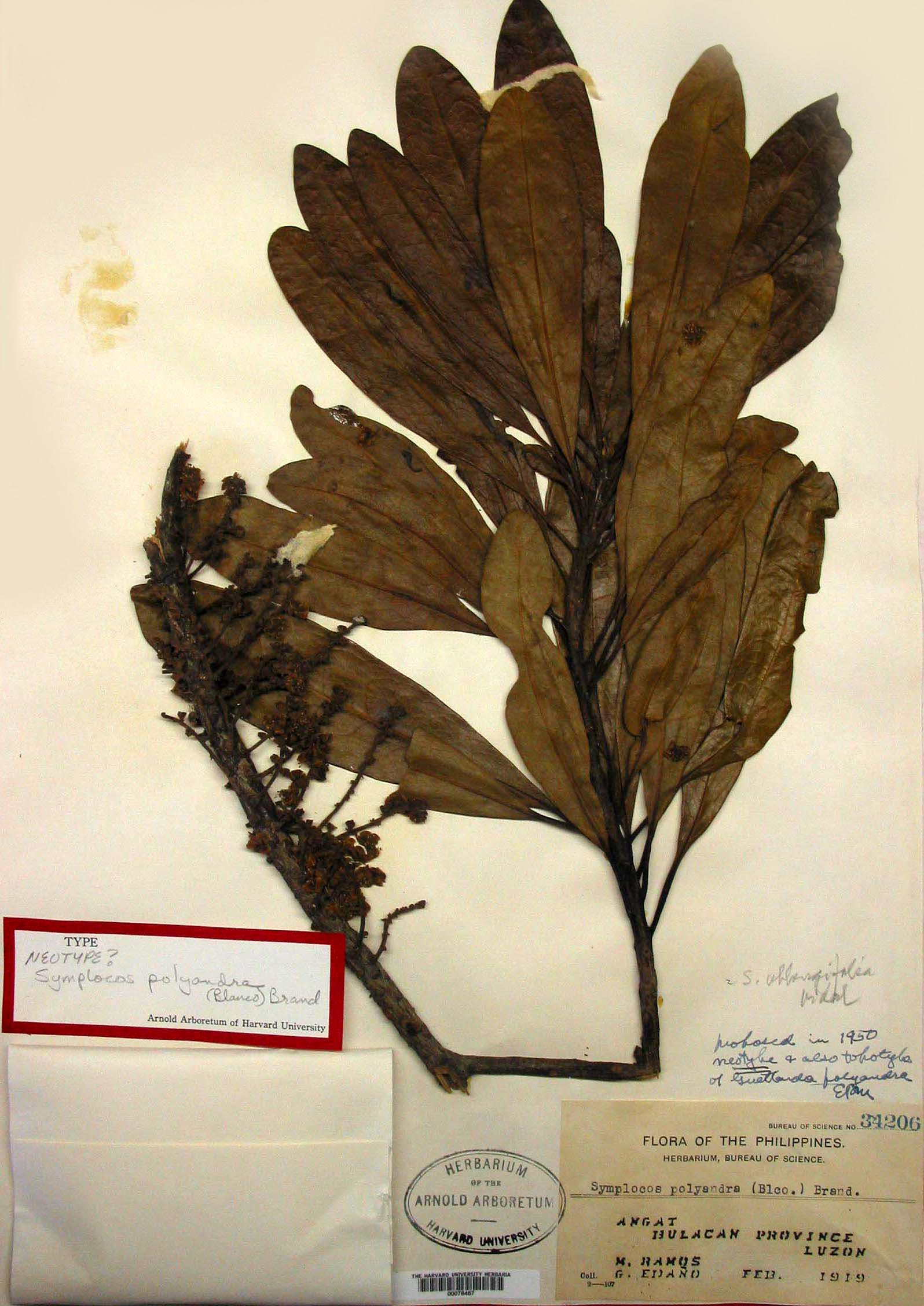

Scientific classification
- Kingdom: Plantae
- Clade: Embryophytes
- Clade: Tracheophytes
- Clade: Spermatophytes
- Clade: Angiosperms
- Clade: Eudicots
- Clade: Asterids
- Order: Ericales
- Family: Symplocaceae
- Genus: Symplocos
- Species: S. polyandra

Binomial name
- Symplocos polyandra (Blanco) Brand

Synonyms
- Symplocos superba Brand

= Symplocos polyandra =

Species of tree

Symplocos polyandra is a tree in the family Symplocaceae, native to maritime Southeast Asia. The specific epithet polyandra refers to the species' many stamens.

== Description ==
Symplocos polyandra grows up to 32 metres (100 ft) tall, with a trunk diameter of up to 40 cm (16 in). The bark is cracked or fissured. The leathery leaves are elliptic to ovate or obovate and measure up to 23 cm (9 in) long. The inflorescences feature spikes of many cream to white flowers. The fruits are violet when ripe. The wood, of moderate weight, is used in local construction.

== Distribution and habitat ==
Symplocos polyandra is native to Borneo, the Philippines and Sulawesi. Its habitat is kerangas and other lowland forests, at elevations to 170 m (600 ft).
