= Symplocos rubiginosa =

Scientific classification
- Kingdom: Plantae
- Clade: Embryophytes
- Clade: Tracheophytes
- Clade: Spermatophytes
- Clade: Angiosperms
- Clade: Eudicots
- Clade: Asterids
- Order: Ericales
- Family: Symplocaceae
- Genus: Symplocos
- Species: S. rubiginosa

Binomial name
- Symplocos rubiginosa Wall. ex A.DC.

Synonyms
- Lodhra rubiginosa (Wall. ex A.DC.) Miers; Eugenioides rubiginosum Kuntze

Species of tree

Symplocos rubiginosa is a tree in the family Symplocaceae, native to Southeast Asia. The specific epithet rubiginosa means 'rust-coloured', referring to the indumentum.

== Description ==
Symplocos rubiginosa grows up to 30 metres (100 ft) tall, with a trunk diameter of up to 50 cm (20 in). The brown bark is smooth. The leaves are obovate to elliptic and measure up to 40 cm (16 in) long. The inflorescences feature spikes, each bearing up to ten white flowers. The ovoid fruits are blue when ripe. The hard timber is locally used in house construction.

== Distribution and habitat ==
Symplocos rubiginosa is native to Peninsular Malaysia, Borneo and Sumatra. Its habitat is kerangas, dipterocarp and montane forests, often by rivers, at elevations of 50–1,100 m (200–3,600 ft).
