= Symplocos ampulliformis =

- Herbarium specimen

Conservation status
- Least Concern (NCA)

Scientific classification
- Kingdom: Plantae
- Clade: Tracheophytes
- Clade: Angiosperms
- Clade: Eudicots
- Clade: Asterids
- Order: Ericales
- Family: Symplocaceae
- Genus: Symplocos
- Species: S. ampulliformis

Binomial name
- Symplocos ampulliformis C.T.White

Species of flowering plant

Symplocos ampulliformis is a species of plant in the family Symplocaceae, endemic to northeast Queensland, Australia. It is a rainforest understory tree up to 10 m (33 ft) tall. It was first described in 1939 by Cyril Tenison White, and published in the Proceedings of the Royal Society of Queensland. The description was based on material collected by White in 1936.

== Conservation ==
This species is listed as least concern in the Queensland Government's WildNet database. As of November 2026, it has not been assessed by the International Union for Conservation of Nature.
