= Symplocos versicolor =

Conservation status
- Critically Endangered (IUCN 2.3)

Scientific classification
- Kingdom: Plantae
- Clade: Tracheophytes
- Clade: Angiosperms
- Clade: Eudicots
- Clade: Asterids
- Order: Ericales
- Family: Symplocaceae
- Genus: Symplocos
- Species: S. versicolor

Binomial name
- Symplocos versicolor C.B.Clarke

Species of flowering plant

Symplocos versicolor is a species of flowering plant in the family Symplocaceae. It is endemic to Sri Lanka.
