= Symplocos crassipes =

Conservation status
- Least Concern (IUCN 3.1)

Scientific classification
- Kingdom: Plantae
- Clade: Embryophytes
- Clade: Tracheophytes
- Clade: Spermatophytes
- Clade: Angiosperms
- Clade: Eudicots
- Clade: Asterids
- Order: Ericales
- Family: Symplocaceae
- Genus: Symplocos
- Species: S. crassipes

Binomial name
- Symplocos crassipes C.B.Clarke

Species of flowering plant

Symplocos crassipes is a plant in the family Symplocaceae, native to Southeast Asia. The specific epithet crassipes means 'thick foot', referring to the stem.

== Description ==
Symplocos crassipes grows as a shrub or tree up to 15 metres (50 ft) tall, with a stem diameter of up to 50 cm (20 in). The bark is smooth. The papery leaves are ovate to elliptic and measure up to 19 cm (7 in) long. The inflorescences bear up to ten flowers. Symplocos crassipes is among the food plants favoured by the Malayan tapir.

== Distribution and habitat ==
Symplocos crassipes is native to Thailand, Peninsular Malaysia and Borneo. Its habitat is forests, including kerangas, to elevations of 1,500 m (5,000 ft).

== Varieties ==
Plants of the World Online recognises seven varieties of Symplocos crassipes:

- Symplocos crassipes var. brandiana (King & Gamble) Noot. – Peninsular Malaysia
- Symplocos crassipes var. crassipes – Peninsular Malaysia
- Symplocos crassipes var. curtisii (Oliv.) Noot. – Thailand, Peninsular Malaysia
- Symplocos crassipes var. ernae (Brand) Noot. – Peninsular Malaysia, Borneo
- Symplocos crassipes var. havilandii (Brand) Noot. – Sarawak
- Symplocos crassipes var. penangiana (King & Gamble) Noot. – Peninsular Malaysia, Borneo
- Symplocos crassipes var. rufomarginata Noot. – Sarawak

== Conservation ==
Symplocos crassipes has been assessed as least concern on the IUCN Red List. However a number of its varieties are threatened:

- Symplocos crassipes var. brandiana – Endangered
- Symplocos crassipes var. ernae – Vulnerable
- Symplocos crassipes var. curtisii – Near Threatened
- Symplocos crassipes var. penangiana – Near Threatened
