= Bukit Baka Bukit Raya National Park =

National park in Indonesia

- IUCN category II (national park)
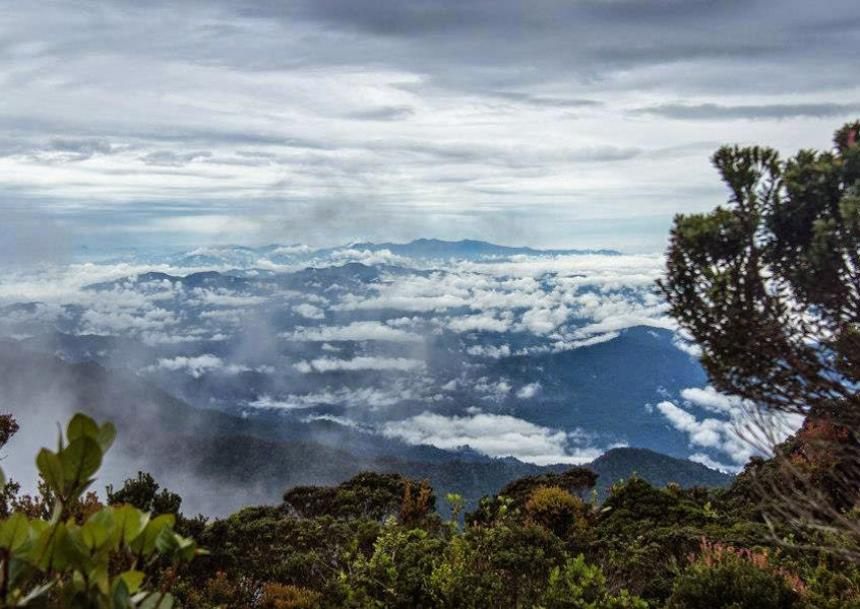
- Mount Bukit Raya in Central Kalimantan

- Location within Borneo
- Location: Borneo, Indonesia
- Nearest city: Palangka Raya
- Coordinates: 0°47′S 112°37′E
- Area: 1,810 km^{2} (700 sq mi)
- Established: 1992
- Governing body: Ministry of Forestry

Bukit Baka Bukit Raya National Park (Indonesian: Taman Nasional Bukit Baka Bukit Raya) is a national park located on Borneo Island, Indonesia. It is named after the mountains of Bukit Baka (1,620 meters (5,310 feet)) and Bukit Raya (2,278 meters (7,474 feet)), part of the Schwaner mountain range at the border of Central and West Kalimantan.

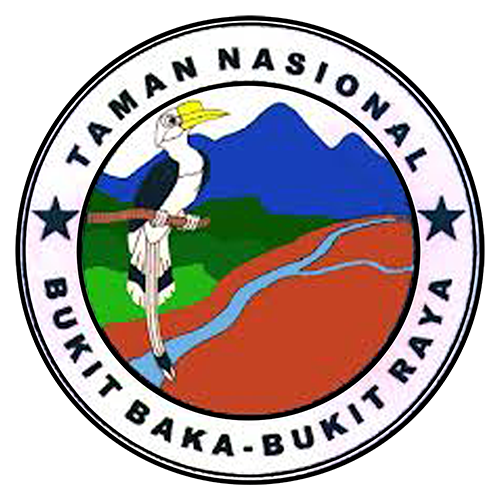
Logo of Bukit Baka Bukit Raya NP

The national park forms part of the Heart of Borneo conservation project.

== Flora and fauna ==
There have been 817 species of plant recorded in the park, including from the families of Dipterocarpaceae, Myrtaceae, Sapotaceae, Euphorbiaceae, Lauraceae and Ericaceae. Plants endemic to the island include Symplocos rayae, Gluta sabahana, Dillenia beccariana, Lithocarpus coopertus, Selaginnella magnifica and Tetracera glaberrima.

The park protects the habitat of clouded leopards, orangutans, sun bears (Helarctos malayanus euryspilus), maroon leaf monkeys, slow lorises (Nycticebus coucang borneanus), sambar deer and flying squirrels. Bird species in the park include the black hornbill, helmeted hornbill, common emerald dove, little cuckoo-dove, Bornean White-Bearded Gibbon and Bornean peacock-pheasant.

== Human habitation ==
Indigenous people in the park include the ethnic groups of the Dayak Limbai, Ransa, Kenyilu, Ot Danum, Malahui, Kahoi and Kahayan.

== Conservation and threats ==
In 1978 a nature reserve of 500 km^{2} around Bukit Raya was established, and the next year it was extended to 1,100 km^{2}. In 1982 the Bukit Baka nature reserve was established, comprising 1,000 km^{2}. After several smaller alterations to the boundaries of both reserves, in 1992 the two protected areas were merged into the Bukit Baka Bukit Raya National Park comprising 1,810 km^{2}.

The park has been affected by severe illegal logging since the end of the 20th century.
