= Symplocos iliaspaiensis =

Conservation status
- Data Deficient (IUCN 3.1)

Scientific classification
- Kingdom: Plantae
- Clade: Embryophytes
- Clade: Tracheophytes
- Clade: Spermatophytes
- Clade: Angiosperms
- Clade: Eudicots
- Clade: Asterids
- Order: Ericales
- Family: Symplocaceae
- Genus: Symplocos
- Species: S. iliaspaiensis

Binomial name
- Symplocos iliaspaiensis Noot.

Species of flowering plant

Symplocos iliaspaiensis is a plant in the family Symplocaceae, native to Borneo. It is named for Ilias Paie, a plant collector at the Sarawak Herbarium.

== Description ==
Symplocos iliaspaiensis grows as a shrub or tree up to 13 metres (43 ft) tall, with a trunk diameter of up to 20 cm (8 in). The pale bark is smooth. The leaves are obovate, ovate or elliptic and measure up to 30.5 cm (12 in) long. The inflorescences bear yellow flowers.

== Varieties ==
Two varieties of Symplocos iliaspaiensis are recognised:

- Symplocos iliaspaiensis var. iliaspaiensis – Sarawak
- Symplocos iliaspaiensis var. pedunculata K.G.Pearce – Sabah, Brunei

== Distribution and habitat ==
Symplocos iliaspaiensis is endemic to Borneo. Its habitat is mixed dipterocarp forests, at elevations of 180–250 m (600–800 ft).
