= Symplocos costaricana =

Conservation status
- Least Concern (IUCN 3.1)

Scientific classification
- Kingdom: Plantae
- Clade: Embryophytes
- Clade: Tracheophytes
- Clade: Angiosperms
- Clade: Eudicots
- Clade: Asterids
- Order: Ericales
- Family: Symplocaceae
- Genus: Symplocos
- Species: S. costaricana

Binomial name
- Symplocos costaricana Hemsl.

Synonyms
- Eugenioides costaricanum (Hemsl.) Kuntze; Symplocos blepharodes Lundell; Symplocos molinae L.O.Williams

Species of flowering plant

Symplocos costaricana, synonym Symplocos molinae, is a species of plant in the family Symplocaceae. It is native to Central America.

== Conservation ==
Symplocos molinae was assessed as critically endangered in the 1998 IUCN Red List, where it was said to be native only to Honduras. As of March 2023, Symplocos molinae is regarded as a synonym of Symplocos costaricana, which has a wider distribution in Central America, and is assessed as least concern.
