= Symplocos henschelii =

Scientific classification
- Kingdom: Plantae
- Clade: Tracheophytes
- Clade: Angiosperms
- Clade: Eudicots
- Clade: Asterids
- Order: Ericales
- Family: Symplocaceae
- Genus: Symplocos
- Species: S. henschelii

Binomial name
- Symplocos henschelii (Moritzi) Benth. ex C.B.Clarke

Species of tree

Symplocos henschelii grows as a tree up to 35 metres (115 ft) tall, with a trunk diameter of up to 60 centimetres (24 in). Bark is grey to brown. Its fragrant flowers feature a white corolla. Fruit is green, up to 5 centimetres (2.0 in) long. Habitat is chiefly montane forests from 800 metres (2,600 ft) to 2,100 metres (6,900 ft) altitude. S. henschelii is found in Burma, Thailand, Malaysia, Indonesia and the Philippines.
