= Symplocos candelabrum =

Scientific classification
- Kingdom: Plantae
- Clade: Tracheophytes
- Clade: Angiosperms
- Clade: Eudicots
- Clade: Asterids
- Order: Ericales
- Family: Symplocaceae
- Genus: Symplocos
- Species: S. candelabrum

Binomial name
- Symplocos candelabrum Brand (1901)

Synonyms
- Symplocos cochinchinensis var. candelabrum (Brand) Noot. (1982)

Species of flowering plant

Symplocos candelabrum is a flowering plant in the sapphireberry family. The specific epithet may refer to the candelabrum-like display of stamens in the flower.

== Description ==
It is a tree growing to 13 m in height with a smooth, dark trunk. The alternate, acute to acuminate leaves are 80–130 mm long, 35–50 mm wide. The yellow-tipped white flowers are 10 mm long and occur in axillary inflorescences from April to June. The oval fruits are bluish when ripe, 10–14 mm long, containing three seeds.

== Distribution and habitat ==
The species is endemic to Australia's subtropical Lord Howe Island in the Tasman Sea. There it occurs in sheltered forest in the southern mountains up to an elevation of about 400 m.
