= Symplocos nairii =

Conservation status
- Endangered (IUCN 2.3)

Scientific classification
- Kingdom: Plantae
- Clade: Tracheophytes
- Clade: Angiosperms
- Clade: Eudicots
- Clade: Asterids
- Order: Ericales
- Family: Symplocaceae
- Genus: Symplocos
- Species: S. nairii

Binomial name
- Symplocos nairii Henry, Gopalan & Swamin.

Species of shrub

Symplocos nairii is a species of plant in the family Symplocaceae. It is endemic to India. Known to be a shrub or small tree, up to 8 m tall; young branchlets angular, glabrous. Leaves simple, alternate, spiral, 7-10 x 4.5–5 cm, elliptic to obovate, apex obtuse, base subcordate and asymmetric, margin serrate, glabrous; midrib canaliculate above; secondary nerves ca. 8 pairs; tertiary nerves obliquely and distantly percurrent; petiole ca. 0.3 cm long, planoconvex in cross section, glabrous. Flowers axillary, solitary or racemes, 1–2 cm long; flowers sessile. Drupe, cylindrical or ellipsoid, 1.1 cm long.

== Description ==
Branchlets Young branchlets angular, glabrous.

Leaves Leaves simple, alternate, spiral; petiole ca. 0.3 cm long, planoconvex in cross section, glabrous; lamina 7-10 x 4.5–5 cm, elliptic to obovate, apex obtuse, base subcordate and asymmetric, margin serrate, glabrous; midrib canaliculate above; secondary nerves ca. 8 pairs; tertiary nerves obliquely distantly percurrent.

Flowers Inflorescence axillary solitary or racemes, 1–2 cm long; flowers sessile.

Fruit& seed Drupe, cylindrical or ellipsoid, 1.1 cm long.
