= Symplocos octopetala =

Conservation status
- Near Threatened (IUCN 2.3)

Scientific classification
- Kingdom: Plantae
- Clade: Tracheophytes
- Clade: Angiosperms
- Clade: Eudicots
- Clade: Asterids
- Order: Ericales
- Family: Symplocaceae
- Genus: Symplocos
- Species: S. octopetala

Binomial name
- Symplocos octopetala Sw.

Species of flowering plant

Symplocos octopetala is a species of evergreen woody plant with small white flowers in the family Symplocaceae. It is endemic to Jamaica. First described in 1788, the most recent concept of the species includes three taxa described as separate species in the late 19th and early 20th century.

== Description ==
Symplocos octopetala is a woody evergreen which ranges in dimension from a shrub to a tree 13 metres (43 ft) tall. The leaves, which are 7.9 to 11.5 centimetres (3.1 to 4.5 in) long and 3.3 to 6.6 centimetres (1.3 to 2.6 in) wide, are alternately arranged along the branches. The small white flowers are borne on short inflorescences each with one to three flowers.

== Taxonomy ==
The species is one of an estimated 340 species in the genus. In their 2015 monograph of Antillean members of the genus Symplocos Peter Fritsch and Frank Almeda placed S. octopetala in the subgenus Symplocos, section Symplocos, series Symplocos, a clade of about 154 species that is restricted to the Neotropics.

Most treatments of Jamaican members of the genus recognised the presence of several species on the island. Fritsch and Almeda, on the other hand, considered all Jamaican Symplocos to belong to a single species, S. octopetala; in their opinion, the characters that were used to distinguish between species to be part of the continuous variation within a single species. They considered S. jamaicensis, S. tubulifera and S. harrisii to be synonyms of S. octopetala.

=== History ===
Symplocos octopetala was first described in 1788 by Swedish botanist Olof Swartz based on specimens he had collected in Jamaica. In 1893 German botanists Karl Wilhelm Leopold Krug and Ignatz Urban described S. tubulifera based on collections made by R. C. Alexander Prior and S. jamaicensis based on collections by W. Purdie. In 1912 August Brand described a fourth Jamaican species, S. harrisii based on a 1909 collection by W. Harris. In his 1972 Flowering Plants of Jamaica C. Dennis Adams placed S. jamaicensis in synonymy with the more widespread species, S. martinicensis, while Dieter Hans Mai considered it a subspecies, S. martinicensis subsp. jamaicensis. Mai also considered S. harrisii a synonymy of S. tubulifera.

== Conservation ==
Based on the fact that the species is endemic to Jamaica and only known from 10 localities on the island, Fritsch and Almeda re-classified it as Vulnerable.
