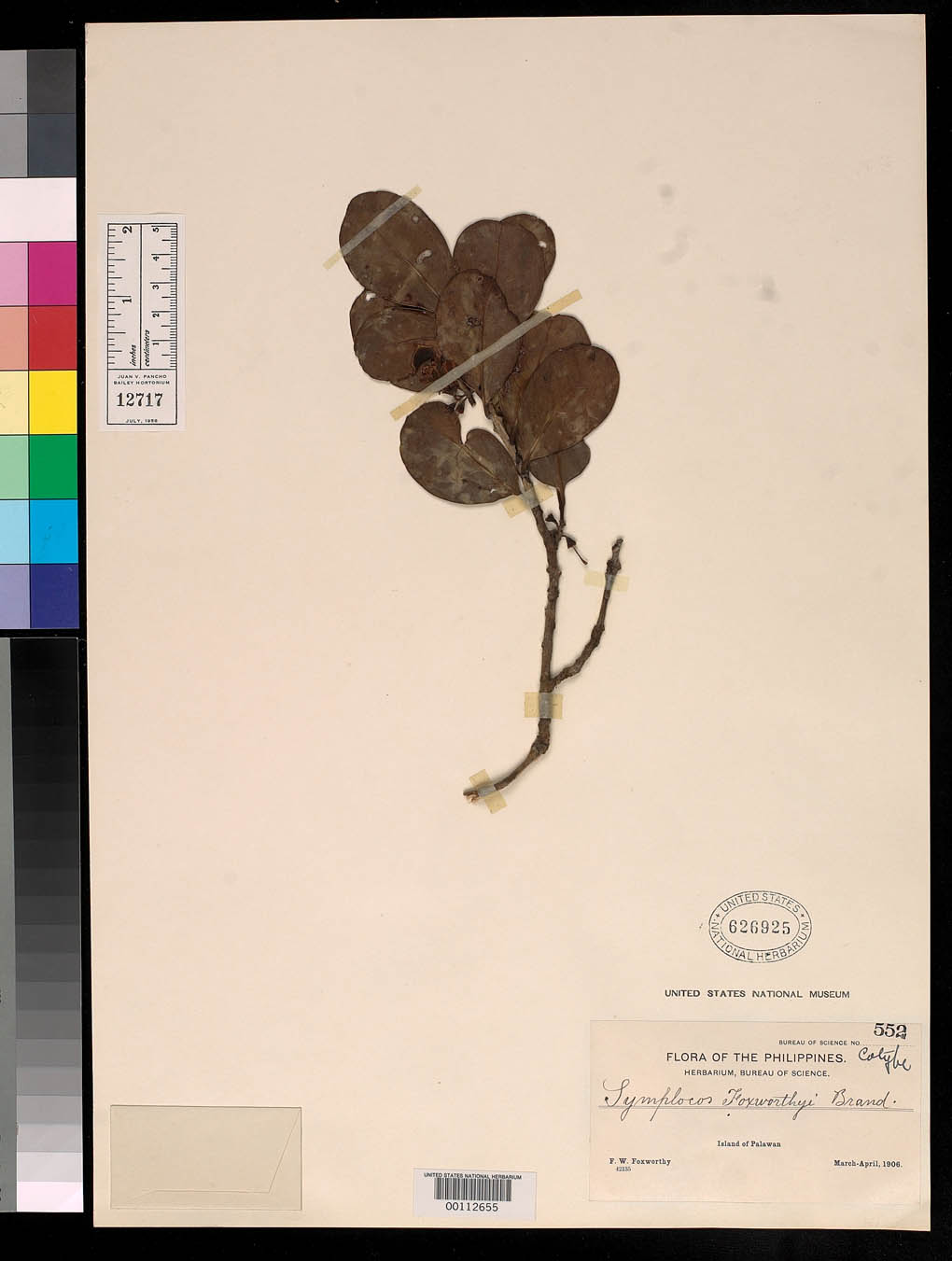

Conservation status
- Least Concern (IUCN 3.1)

Scientific classification
- Kingdom: Plantae
- Clade: Tracheophytes
- Clade: Angiosperms
- Clade: Eudicots
- Clade: Asterids
- Order: Ericales
- Family: Symplocaceae
- Genus: Symplocos
- Species: S. pendula

Binomial name
- Symplocos pendula Wight

Synonyms
- List: Cordyloblaste pendula (Wight) Alston; Palura pendula (Wight) Miers; Styrax obovatus Ridl.; Bobua confusa (Brand) Kaneh. & Sasaki; Cordyloblaste confusa (Brand) Ridl.; Cordyloblaste crenulata (Ridl.) Ridl.; Cordyloblaste pulcherrima (Ridl.) Ridl.; Cordyloblaste sessilis (C.B.Clarke) A.N.Henry & B.Roy; Eugenioides pauciflorum (Wight ex C.B.Clarke) Kuntze; Eugenioides pendulum Kuntze; Eugenioides sessile (C.B.Clarke) Kuntze; Symplocos albifrons Brand; Symplocos atrata Brand; Symplocos capitellata Brand; Symplocos confusa Brand; Symplocos crenulata Ridl.; Symplocos foxworthyi Brand; Symplocos novoguineensis Gibbs; Symplocos pauciflora Wight ex C.B.Clarke; Symplocos pulcherrima Ridl.; Symplocos punctulata Masam. & Syozi; Symplocos sessilis C.B.Clarke; Symplocos topica Brand

= Symplocos pendula =

Species of flowering plant

Symplocos pendula is a flowering plant in the family Symplocaceae. It is native to eastern and tropical Asia.

== Description ==
Symplocos pendula grows as a tree up to 24 m (80 ft) tall, with a trunk diameter of up to 30 cm (12 in). Its bark is dark brown. The fragrant flowers feature a white, cream or pink corolla. The fruit is reddish green.

== Distribution and habitat ==
Symplocos pendula is native to Japan, China, Taiwan, India, Sri Lanka, Myanmar, Vietnam, Malaysia, Indonesia, the Philippines and New Guinea. Its habitat is montane forests from 800–3,400 m (2,600–11,200 ft) altitude.
