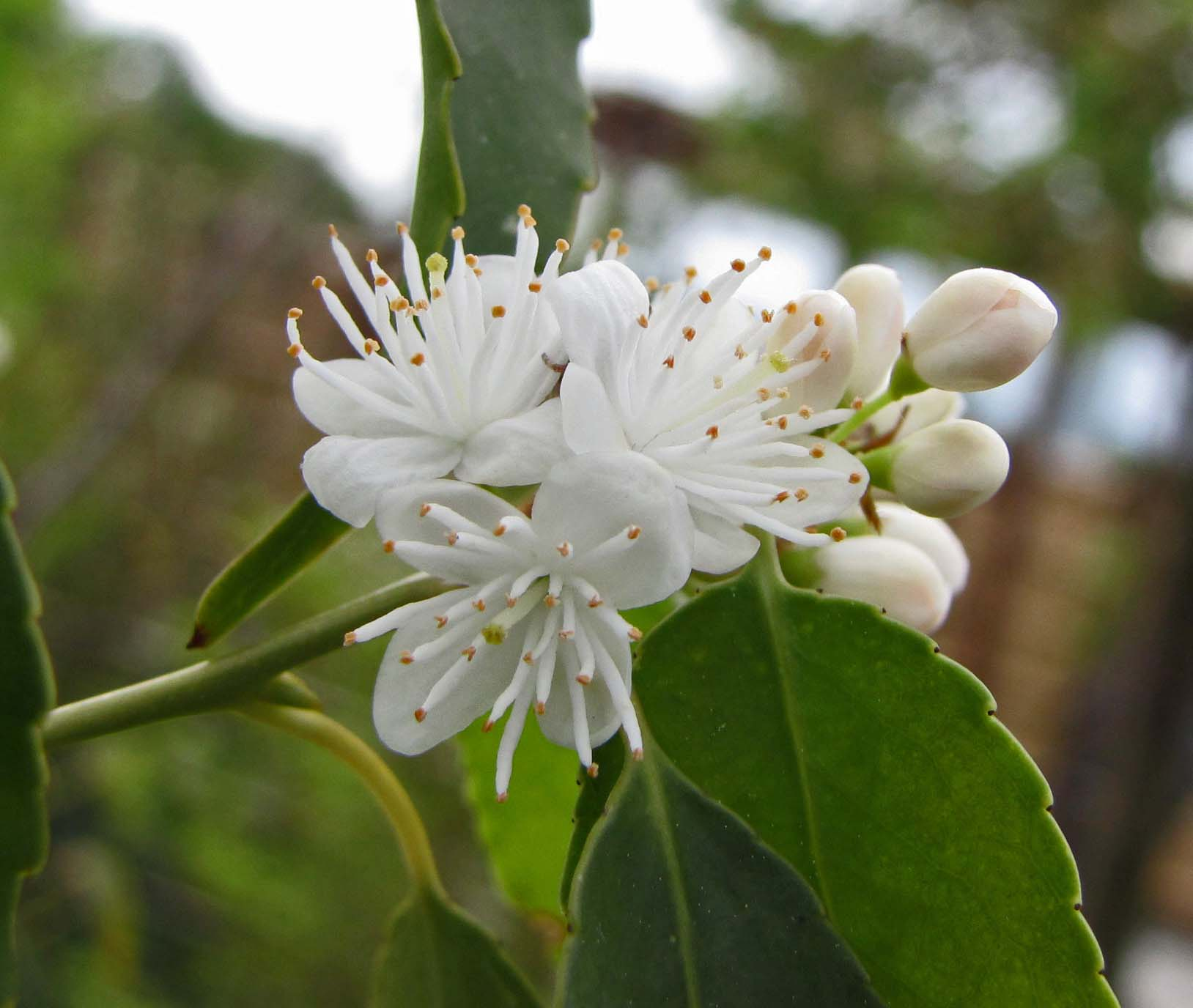

Conservation status
- Least Concern (IUCN 3.1)

Scientific classification
- Kingdom: Plantae
- Clade: Tracheophytes
- Clade: Angiosperms
- Clade: Eudicots
- Clade: Asterids
- Order: Ericales
- Family: Symplocaceae
- Genus: Symplocos
- Species: S. myrtacea

Binomial name
- Symplocos myrtacea Siebold & Zucc.

= Symplocos myrtacea =

Species of tree

Symplocos myrtacea, commonly known as Japanese sapphireberry, is a species of tree native to Japan.

It has been recorded as a host for the rare fungus Chorioactis geaster.
