= Symplocos tacanensis =

Conservation status
- Vulnerable (IUCN 2.3)

Scientific classification
- Kingdom: Plantae
- Clade: Tracheophytes
- Clade: Angiosperms
- Clade: Eudicots
- Clade: Asterids
- Order: Ericales
- Family: Symplocaceae
- Genus: Symplocos
- Species: S. tacanensis

Binomial name
- Symplocos tacanensis Lundell

Species of flowering plant

Symplocos tacanensis is a species of plant in the family Symplocaceae. It is found in El Salvador and Guatemala. It is threatened by habitat loss and is considered to be a "threatened" species by the International Union for Conservation of Nature and Natural Resources.
