= Symplocos pulchra =

Conservation status
- Endangered (IUCN 2.3)

Scientific classification
- Kingdom: Plantae
- Clade: Tracheophytes
- Clade: Angiosperms
- Clade: Eudicots
- Clade: Asterids
- Order: Ericales
- Family: Symplocaceae
- Genus: Symplocos
- Species: S. pulchra

Binomial name
- Symplocos pulchra Wight

Subspecies
- Symplocos pulchra subsp. coriacea Gopalan & A.N.Henry; Symplocos pulchra subsp. hispidula (Thwaites) Noot.; Symplocos pulchra subsp. pulchra; Symplocos pulchra subsp. villosa (Brand) Noot.

Synonyms
- Lodhra pulchra (Wight) Miers; synonyms of subsp. hispidula: Eugenioides hispidulum (Thwaites) Kuntze; Lodhra hispidula (Thwaites) Miers; Symplocos subcordata Wight ex C.B.Clarke; Symplocos hispidula Thwaites; Symplocos walkeri Brand; synonyms of subsp. pulchra: Eugenioides pulchrum Kuntze; synonyms of subsp. villosa: Symplocos villosa Brand

Species of flowering plant

Symplocos pulchra is a species of flowering plant in the family Symplocaceae. It is a tree native to southern India and Sri Lanka.

Four subspecies are accepted:

- Symplocos pulchra subsp. coriacea Gopalan & A.N.Henry – Agastyamalai Hills of Tamil Nadu state in southern India
- Symplocos pulchra subsp. hispidula (Thwaites) Noot. – Sri Lanka
- Symplocos pulchra subsp. pulchra – southern India
- Symplocos pulchra subsp. villosa (Brand) Noot. – southern India
