= Symplocos lugubris =

Conservation status
- Vulnerable (IUCN 2.3)

Scientific classification
- Kingdom: Plantae
- Clade: Tracheophytes
- Clade: Angiosperms
- Clade: Eudicots
- Clade: Asterids
- Order: Ericales
- Family: Symplocaceae
- Genus: Symplocos
- Species: S. lugubris

Binomial name
- Symplocos lugubris Brand

Species of plant

Symplocos lugubris is a species of plant in the family Symplocaceae. It is endemic to Peru.
