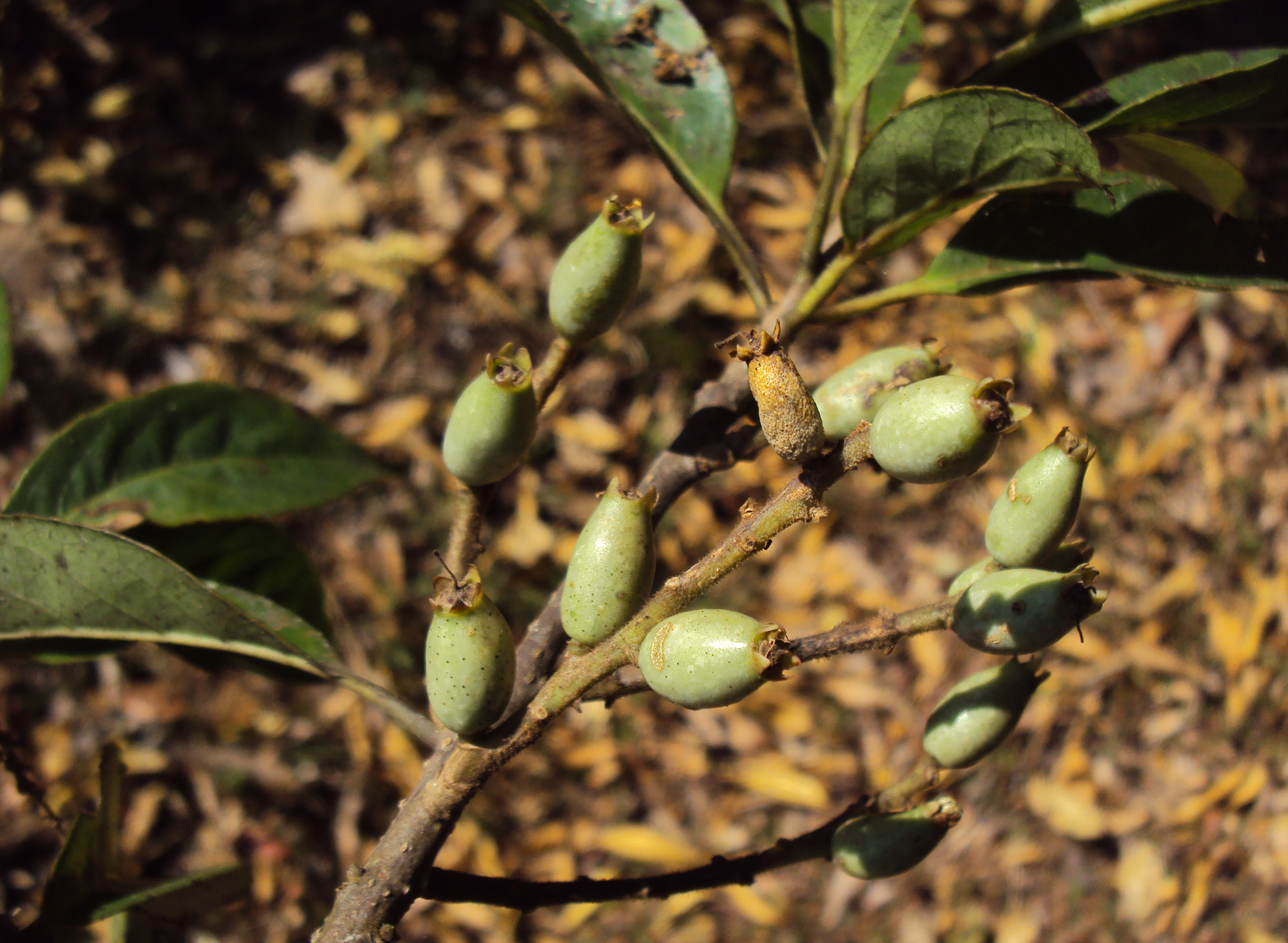

Scientific classification
- Kingdom: Plantae
- Clade: Tracheophytes
- Clade: Angiosperms
- Clade: Eudicots
- Clade: Asterids
- Order: Ericales
- Family: Symplocaceae
- Genus: Symplocos
- Species: S. racemosa

Binomial name
- Symplocos racemosa Roxb.

Synonyms
- Eugenioides racemosum (Roxb.) Kuntze; Hopea racemosa (Roxb.) Dalzell & A.Gibson; Lodhra racemosa (Roxb.) Miers

= Symplocos racemosa =

Species of flowering plant

Symplocos racemosa is a species of plant in the family Symplocaceae. It is native to Southeast Asia.
