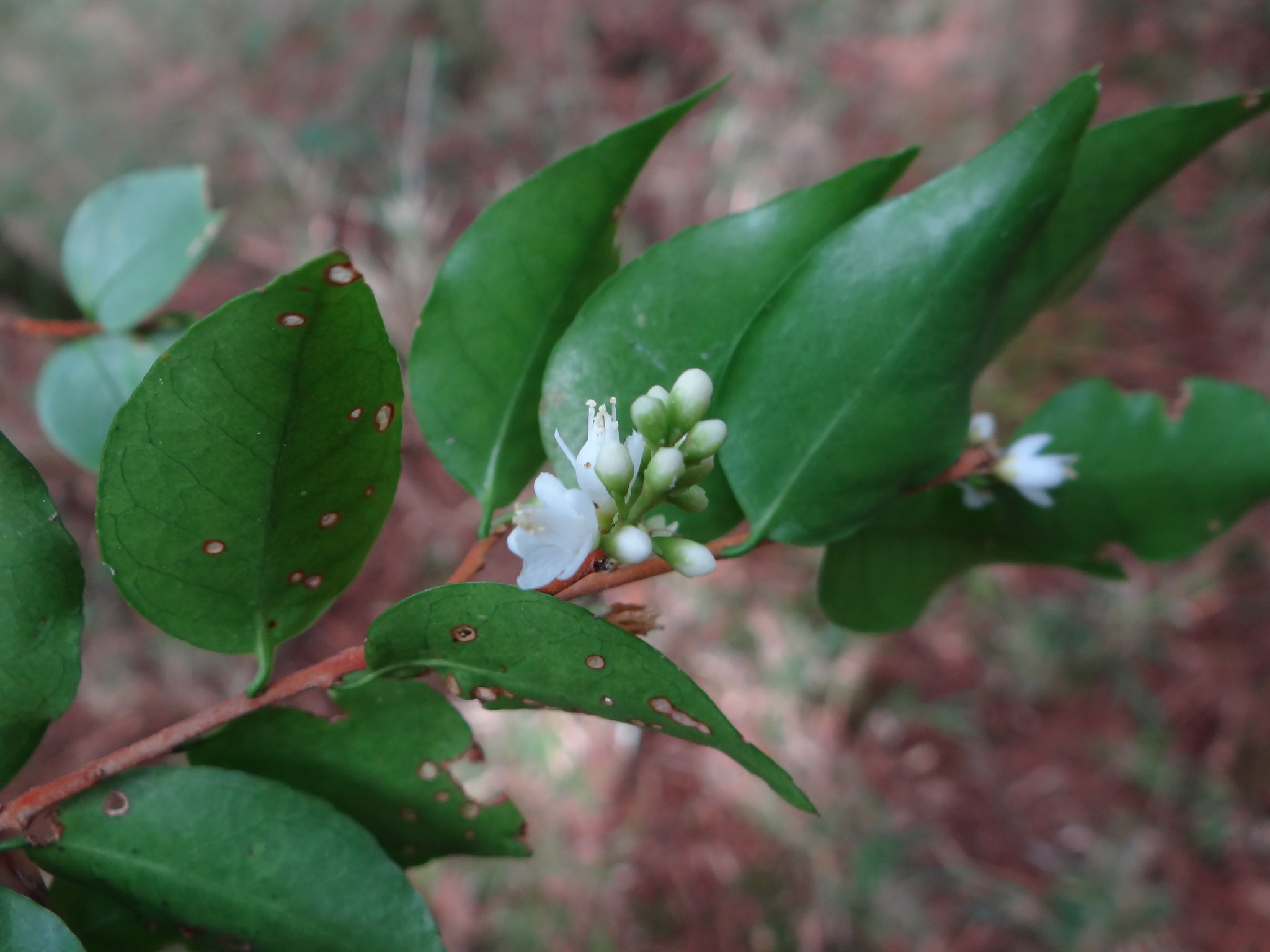
- In Taiwan

Conservation status
- Least Concern (IUCN 3.1)

Scientific classification
- Kingdom: Plantae
- Clade: Embryophytes
- Clade: Tracheophytes
- Clade: Spermatophytes
- Clade: Angiosperms
- Clade: Eudicots
- Clade: Asterids
- Order: Ericales
- Family: Symplocaceae
- Genus: Symplocos
- Species: S. anomala

Binomial name
- Symplocos anomala Brand

Synonyms
- List: Bobua anomala (Brand) Migo; Bobua doii (Hayata) Kaneh. & Sasaki; Bobua morrisonicola (Hayata) Kaneh. & Sasaki; Bobua okinawensis (Matsum.) Nemoto; Dicalix anomalus (Brand) H.Migo; Dicalix fusonii (Merr.) H.Migo; Symplocos alata Brand; Symplocos argentea Brand; Symplocos chevalieri Guillaumin; Symplocos concolor Brand; Symplocos dielsii H.Lév.; Symplocos doii Hayata; Symplocos esquirolii H.Lév.; Symplocos fusonii Merr.; Symplocos kiraishiensis Hayata; Symplocos morrisonicola Hayata; Symplocos nagensis C.E.C.Fisch.; Symplocos okinawensis Matsum.

= Symplocos anomala =

Species of flowering plant

Symplocos anomala is a plant in the family Symplocaceae.

== Description ==
Symplocos anomala grows as a shrub or tree up to 30 metres (100 ft) tall, with a trunk diameter of up to 50 centimetres (20 in). The bark is grey or brown. Its flowers feature a white corolla. The fruit is purple to black when ripe.

== Distribution and habitat ==
Symplocos anomala is native to Japan, China, Taiwan, Myanmar, Thailand, Borneo and Sumatra. Its habitat is chiefly in montane forests from 900 metres (3,000 ft) to 2,000 metres (6,600 ft) altitude.
