= Symplocos nicolsonii =

Scientific classification
- Kingdom: Plantae
- Clade: Tracheophytes
- Clade: Angiosperms
- Clade: Eudicots
- Clade: Asterids
- Order: Ericales
- Family: Symplocaceae
- Genus: Symplocos
- Species: S. nicolsonii

Binomial name
- Symplocos nicolsonii R.Jagad. et al.

Species of tree

Symplocos nicolsonii is a species of evergreen tree in the family Symplocaceae. It is endemic to Western Ghats in India.

The species was named after the noted botanical taxonomist Dan H. Nicolson.
