= Symplocos adenophylla =

Scientific classification
- Kingdom: Plantae
- Clade: Tracheophytes
- Clade: Angiosperms
- Clade: Eudicots
- Clade: Asterids
- Order: Ericales
- Family: Symplocaceae
- Genus: Symplocos
- Species: S. adenophylla

Binomial name
- Symplocos adenophylla Wall. ex G.Don

Synonyms
- Symplocos iteophylla Miq.; Symplocos maclurei Merr.; Symplocos punctomarginata A.Chev. ex Guill.; Symplocos stewardii Sleumer

Species of shrub

Symplocos adenophylla grows as a shrub or tree up to 30 metres (100 ft) tall, with a trunk diameter of up to 40 centimetres (16 in). Bark is grey to dark brown or black. Its fragrant flowers feature a white to yellow corolla. Fruit is blue when ripe. Habitat is forests from sea-level to 3,000 metres (9,800 ft) altitude. S. adenophylla is found in China, Thailand, Laos, Vietnam, Malaysia, Brunei and Indonesia.
