= Symplocos fasciculata =

Scientific classification
- Kingdom: Plantae
- Clade: Embryophytes
- Clade: Tracheophytes
- Clade: Spermatophytes
- Clade: Angiosperms
- Clade: Eudicots
- Clade: Asterids
- Order: Ericales
- Family: Symplocaceae
- Genus: Symplocos
- Species: S. fasciculata

Binomial name
- Symplocos fasciculata Zoll.

Synonyms
- Serjania tinctoria Sandifort; Dicalix tinctorius Blume; Eugenioides fasciculatum Kuntze; Symplocos phanerophlebia Merr.

Species of tree

Symplocos fasciculata is a tree in the family Symplocaceae, native to tropical Asia. The specific epithet fasciculata means 'bundled' and refers to the inflorescence.

== Description ==
Symplocos fasciculata grows up to 23 metres (80 ft) tall, occasionally to 35 m (115 ft), with a trunk diameter of up to 45 cm (18 in). The smooth bark may be brown or grey, occasionally green. The twigs are somewhat zig-zag. The papery leaves, of varying shapes, measure up to 16.5 cm (6 in) long. The inflorescences feature fascicles of bundled racemes bearing white flowers.

== Distribution and habitat ==
Symplocos fasciculata is native to the Nicobar Islands, Peninsular Malaysia, Sumatra, Borneo, Java, the Philippines and Sulawesi. Its habitat is kerangas and mixed dipterocarp forests, at elevations to 1,700 m (5,600 ft).

== Uses ==
In Java, the bark and leaves of Symplocos fasciculata are used to make dyes, including for batik. In local medicine, a powdered form of the bark is used as a remedy for sore eyes.
