= Symplocos truncata =

Conservation status
- Endangered (IUCN 3.1)

Scientific classification
- Kingdom: Plantae
- Clade: Tracheophytes
- Clade: Angiosperms
- Clade: Eudicots
- Clade: Asterids
- Order: Ericales
- Family: Symplocaceae
- Genus: Symplocos
- Species: S. truncata

Binomial name
- Symplocos truncata B.Ståhl

Species of flowering plant

Symplocos truncata is a species of plant in the family Symplocaceae. It is endemic to Ecuador. Its natural habitat is subtropical or tropical moist montane forest.
