= Symplocos cuneata =

Scientific classification
- Kingdom: Plantae
- Clade: Tracheophytes
- Clade: Angiosperms
- Clade: Eudicots
- Clade: Asterids
- Order: Ericales
- Family: Symplocaceae
- Genus: Symplocos
- Species: S. cuneata

Binomial name
- Symplocos cuneata Thwaites

Species of flowering plant

Symplocos cuneata is a species of plant in the family Symplocaceae. It is endemic to Sri Lanka.

== Flowers ==
Pinkish-white; Inflorescence - short, adpressed hairy raceme.
