= Symplocos buxifolia =

Conservation status
- Least Concern (IUCN 3.1)

Scientific classification
- Kingdom: Plantae
- Clade: Embryophytes
- Clade: Tracheophytes
- Clade: Spermatophytes
- Clade: Angiosperms
- Clade: Eudicots
- Clade: Asterids
- Order: Ericales
- Family: Symplocaceae
- Genus: Symplocos
- Species: S. buxifolia

Binomial name
- Symplocos buxifolia Stapf

Species of flowering plant

Symplocos buxifolia is a plant in the family Symplocaceae, native to Borneo. The specific epithet buxifolia refers to the leaves' resemblance to those of species in the genus Buxus.

== Description ==
Symplocos buxifolia grows as a shrub or tree up to 10 metres (33 ft) tall. The straight twigs become cracked with age. The leathery leaves are elliptic to obovate and measure up to 4.5 cm (2 in) long. The inflorescences, sometimes featuring racemes, bear white to yellow flowers.

== Distribution and habitat ==
Symplocos buxifolia is endemic to Borneo, where it is known only from Mount Kinabalu in Sabah. Its habitat is montane forests, at elevations of 2,400–4,000 m (8,000–13,000 ft).
