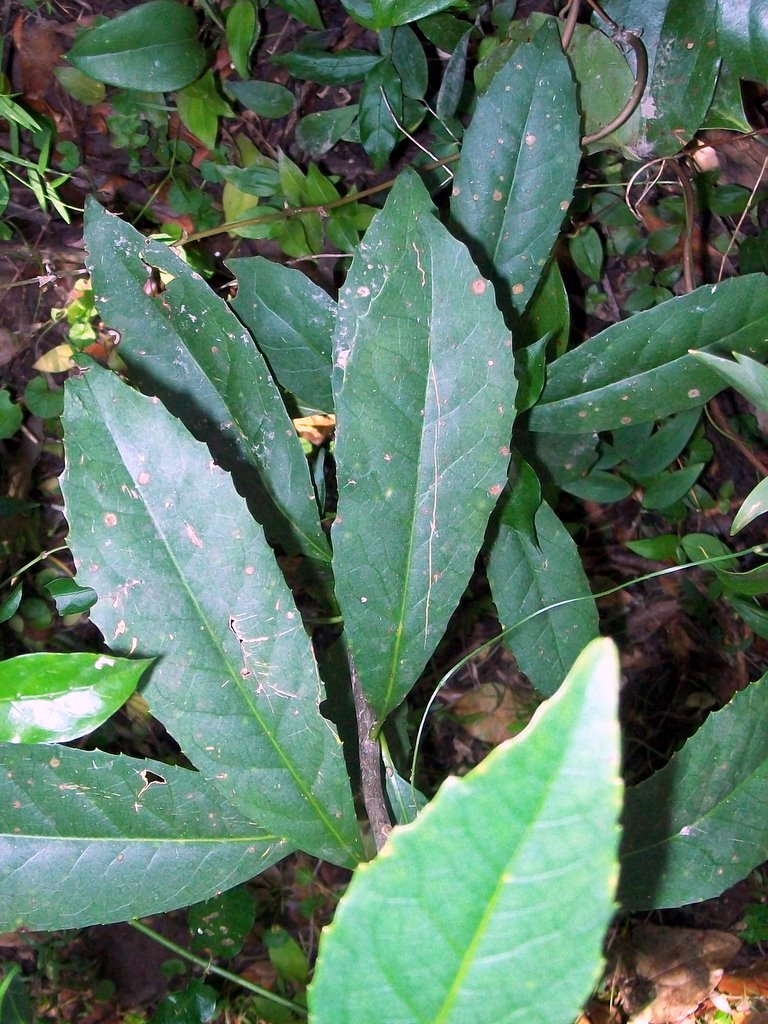
- Buff hazelwood at Cattai Creek, Australia

Scientific classification
- Kingdom: Plantae
- Clade: Tracheophytes
- Clade: Angiosperms
- Clade: Eudicots
- Clade: Asterids
- Order: Ericales
- Family: Symplocaceae
- Genus: Symplocos
- Species: S. thwaitesii

Binomial name
- Symplocos thwaitesii F.Muell.

Synonyms
- Symplocos cochinchinensis subsp. thwaitesii (Lour.) Moore var. thwaitesii F.Muell. Nooteb.

= Symplocos thwaitesii =

Buff hazelwood

Species of tree

Symplocos thwaitesii, or the buff hazelwood, is a rainforest tree growing in eastern Australia. Seen in tropical, sub-tropical and warm temperate rainforests, often in gullies. Occasionally it grows in cooler situations such as at Monga National Park.

The range of natural distribution is from Orbost (37° S) in the state of Victoria up the east coast of New South Wales to the Atherton Tableland (17° S) in tropical Queensland.

== Description ==
A small to medium-sized tree, up to 30 metres tall and 80 cm in diameter. Usually much smaller, particularly in New South Wales where it is mostly seen between 6 and 12 metres in height. In Victoria it can grow to 22 metres high, with a trunk diameter of 57 cm.

The trunk is straight and cylindrical, without buttresses or fluting. The bark is fairly smooth; dark brown in colour. Sometimes with vertical rows of bumps. Flaking plates of bark and vertical cracks may be seen on larger trees.

=== Leaves ===
Leaves alternate, firm, heavy and toothed, but not toothed at the base. The leaf serration is more evident and more widely spaced than in the white hazelwood. The leathery leaves "rattle" together when a branch is shaken. The leaf shape is elliptic or wide lanceolate 12 to 18 cm long to a short leaf tip.

Leaf venation is easily noticed, particularly on the underside. Net veins are not clearly evident above the leaf, better seen under the leaf. The paler coloured midrib is sunken on the top leaf surface, and raised under the leaf. The leaf stalk is 10 to 15 mm long, flattened on the top side and but rounded underneath.

=== Flowers and fruit ===
The greenish white flowers form on racemes; occasionally the flowers turn bluish-black. Flowering occurs between the months of September to December, although these trees may flower at other times such as between May and June. Flowers are relatively large, 9 to 15 mm long, giving rise to an alternative common name large-flowered hazelwood. Another distinguishing feature is that the flowers of the similar white hazelwood are on panicles, not racemes as is the case in this species.

The fruit is a drupe, 12 to 14 mm long, purplish-black and egg-shaped, maturing in January to March. The five sepals persist on the fruit, but not the floral bracts. The fruit is eaten by the green catbird. Fresh seed should be used for regeneration, after the removal of the aril.
