= Symplocos cochinchinensis =

Scientific classification
- Kingdom: Plantae
- Clade: Tracheophytes
- Clade: Angiosperms
- Clade: Eudicots
- Clade: Asterids
- Order: Ericales
- Family: Symplocaceae
- Genus: Symplocos
- Species: S. cochinchinensis

Binomial name
- Symplocos cochinchinensis (Lour.) S.Moore

Synonyms
- Dicalix cochinchinensis Lour.

Species of flowering plant

Symplocos cochinchinensis

Symplocos cochinchinensis is a species of flowering plant in the sapphire-berry family, Symplocaceae. It is found in tropical and subtropical Asia. The widespread Symplocos cochinchinensis subsp./var. laurina is now considered a synonym of Symplocos acuminata.

== Distribution ==
It is native to Assam, the Bismarck Archipelago, Borneo, Cambodia, South-Central and Southeast China, East Himalaya, Fiji, Hainan, Japan, Java, Laos, the Lesser Sunda Islands, Malaysia, the Maluku Islands, Myanmar, Nepal, New Guinea, the Philippines, Queensland (Australia), the Ryukyu Islands, the Santa Cruz Islands, the Solomon Islands, Sulawesi, Sumatra, Taiwan, Thailand, Tibet, Vanuatu, and Vietnam.

== Subtaxa ==
The following subspecies and varieties are accepted:

- Symplocos cochinchinensis var. aneityensis (Brand) Noot. – Vanuatu
- Symplocos cochinchinensis var. angustifolia (Guillaumin) Noot. – Hainan, Vietnam
- Symplocos cochinchinensis var. doormannensis (Brand) Noot. – New Guinea
- Symplocos cochinchinensis var. floresana Noot. – Flores
- Symplocos cochinchinensis var. glaberrima Noot. – Queensland
- Symplocos cochinchinensis var. imbricata (Brand) Noot. – Luzon
- Symplocos cochinchinensis var. insularis Noot. – Papua New Guinea
- Symplocos cochinchinensis subsp. leptophylla (Brand) Noot. – Bismarck Archipelago, Fiji, Maluku Islands, New Guinea, Santa Cruz Islands, Solomon Islands
- Symplocos cochinchinensis var. longilobata Noot. – Papua New Guinea
- Symplocos cochinchinensis var. molobros (Brand) Noot. – New Guinea
- Symplocos cochinchinensis var. monticola Noot. – Papua New Guinea
- Symplocos cochinchinensis var. orbicularis (Hemsl.) Noot. – New Guinea
- Symplocos cochinchinensis var. ovata Noot. – Papua New Guinea
- Symplocos cochinchinensis var. parvifolia Noot. – Papua New Guinea
- Symplocos cochinchinensis var. pedicellata Noot. – Papua New Guinea
- Symplocos cochinchinensis var. philippinensis (Brand) Noot. – Java, Lesser Sunda Islands, Maluku Islands, Philippines, Sulawesi, Taiwan
- Symplocos cochinchinensis var. reginae (Brand) Noot. – New Guinea
- Symplocos cochinchinensis var. revoluta Noot. – New Guinea
- Symplocos cochinchinensis var. schumanniana (Brand) Noot. – Bismarck Archipelago, Maluku Islands, New Guinea
- Symplocos cochinchinensis var. sessifolia (Blume) Noot. – west and central Java
- Symplocos cochinchinensis var. sogeriensis (Brand) Noot. – New Guinea
- Symplocos cochinchinensis var. tomentosa Noot. – Louisiade Archipelago
- Symplocos cochinchinensis var. versteegii (Brand) Noot. – New Guinea
