= Symplocos rayae =

Scientific classification
- Kingdom: Plantae
- Clade: Tracheophytes
- Clade: Angiosperms
- Clade: Eudicots
- Clade: Asterids
- Order: Ericales
- Family: Symplocaceae
- Genus: Symplocos
- Species: S. rayae

Binomial name
- Symplocos rayae Noot.

Flowering plant

Symplocos rayae is a species of flowering plant in the genus Symplocos. The plant is endemic to the mountainous interior of the island of Borneo. The plant has been described as being around 8 m tall with a smooth brown trunk around 10 cm in diameter. The leaves of S. rayae are dark green and the fruits of the plant are greenish-white.
