= Symplocos coccinea =

Conservation status
- Near Threatened (IUCN 3.1)

Scientific classification
- Kingdom: Plantae
- Clade: Tracheophytes
- Clade: Angiosperms
- Clade: Eudicots
- Clade: Asterids
- Order: Ericales
- Family: Symplocaceae
- Genus: Symplocos
- Species: S. coccinea

Binomial name
- Symplocos coccinea Humb. & Bonpl.

Species of flowering plant

Symplocos coccinea is a species of plant in the family Symplocaceae. It is endemic to Mexico. It is threatened by habitat loss.
