= Symplocos nivea =

Conservation status
- Endangered (IUCN 2.3)

Scientific classification
- Kingdom: Plantae
- Clade: Tracheophytes
- Clade: Angiosperms
- Clade: Eudicots
- Clade: Asterids
- Order: Ericales
- Family: Symplocaceae
- Genus: Symplocos
- Species: S. nivea

Binomial name
- Symplocos nivea Brand
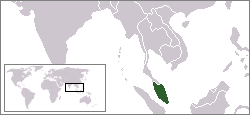
- Symplocos nivea is native to peninsular Malaysia

Species of tree

Symplocos nivea is a species of plant in the family Symplocaceae. It is a tree endemic to Peninsular Malaysia.

== Conservation ==
It is threatened by habitat loss.
