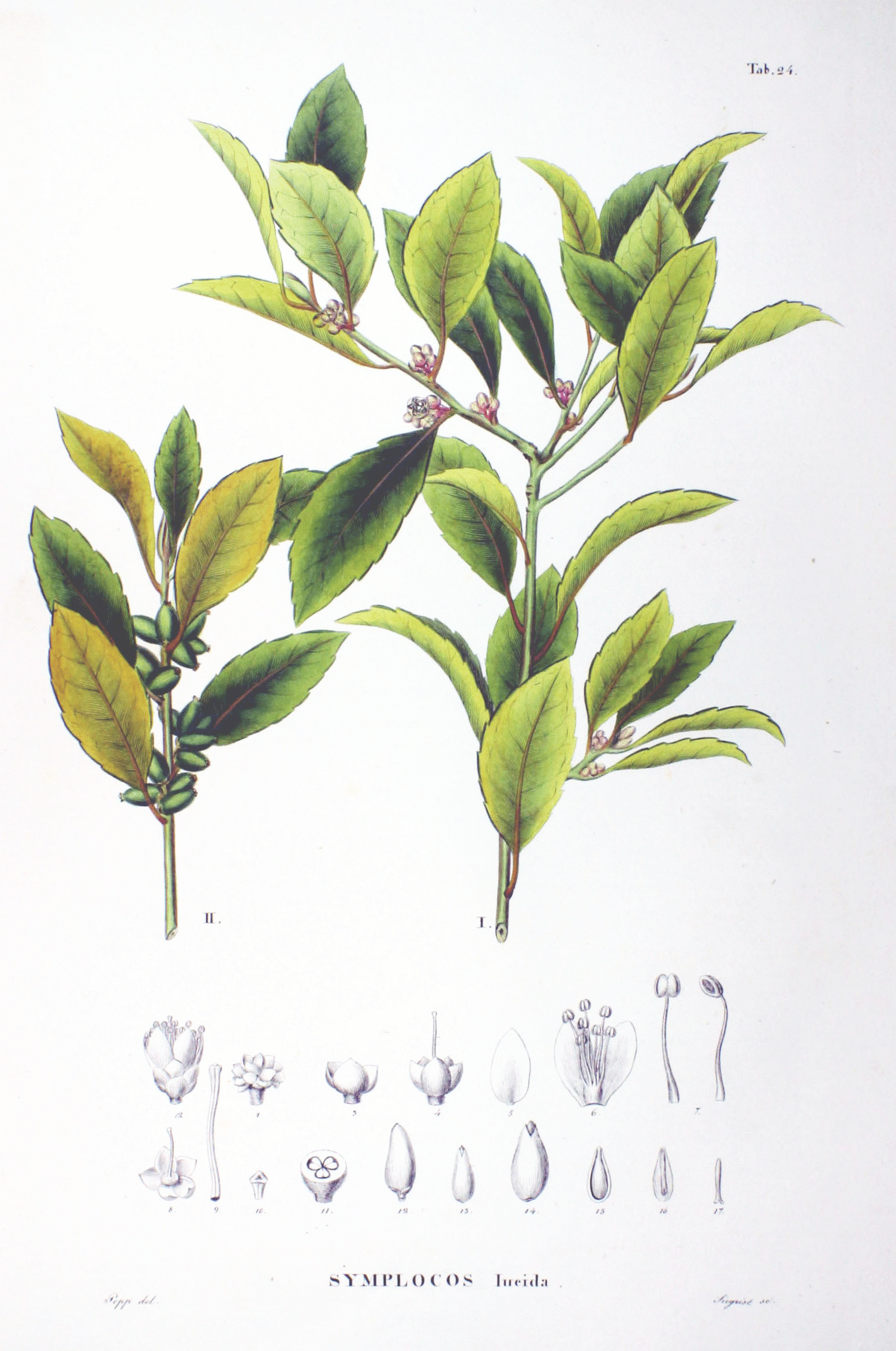
- Plate by Philipp Franz von Siebold and Joseph Gerhard Zuccarini

Scientific classification
- Kingdom: Plantae
- Clade: Embryophytes
- Clade: Tracheophytes
- Clade: Angiosperms
- Clade: Eudicots
- Clade: Asterids
- Order: Ericales
- Family: Symplocaceae
- Genus: Symplocos; Jacq.

Species
- See List of Symplocos species

Synonyms
- 26 synonyms: Eugenioides L. ex Kuntze; Barberina Vell.; Bobu Adans.; Bobua DC.; Carlea C.Presl; Catonia Vell.; Chasseloupia Vieill.; Ciponima Aubl.; Cofer Loefl.; Cordyloblaste Hensch. ex Moritzi; Decadia Lour.; Dicalix Lour.; Drupatris Lour.; Hopea L.; Hosea Dennst.; Hypopogon Turcz.; Lodhra Guill.; Mongezia Vell.; Palura (G.Don) Miers; Praealstonia Miers; Protohopea Miers; Sariava Reinw.; Scyrtocarpus Miers; Stemmatosiphum Pohl; Suringaria Pierre; Usteria Dennst.

= Symplocos =

Symplocos Temporal range: Eocene–Present

Genus of flowering plants

Symplocos is a genus of flowering plants in the order Ericales, and is the only genus in family Symplocaceae. It comprises about 400 species distributed through tropical and subtropical Asia, Australia, the western Pacific and the Americas.

== Description ==
Species in this family are shrubs or trees; they may be dioecious, polygamous or bisexual. Leaves are mostly spirally arranged and are simple with entire or toothed margins; stipules are absent, petioles present, venation pinnate. Inflorescences take various forms, mostly a raceme, spike, panicle, glomerule or a solitary flower. Fruits are single-seeded drupes, often blue.

== Distribution ==
Symplocos is native to the following regions as defined in the World Geographical Scheme for Recording Plant Distributions:

- Indian Subcontinent: Assam, Bangladesh, East Himalaya, India, Nepal, Sri Lanka, West Himalaya
- China: China North-Central, China South-Central, China Southeast, Hainan, Inner Mongolia, Manchuria, Tibet
- Eastern Asia: Japan, Korea, Nansei-shoto, Ogasawara-shoto, Taiwan
- Indo-China: Andaman Is., Cambodia, Laos, Myanmar, Nicobar Is., Thailand, Vietnam
- Malesia: Borneo, Jawa, Lesser Sunda Is., Malaya, Maluku, Philippines, Sulawesi, Sumatera
- Papuasia: Bismarck Archipelago, New Guinea, Solomon Is.
- Australia: New South Wales, Norfolk Is., Queensland
- Northwestern Pacific: Caroline Is.
- Southwestern Pacific: Fiji, New Caledonia, Santa Cruz Is., Vanuatu
- Mexico: Mexico Central, Mexico Gulf, Mexico Northeast, Mexico Southeast, Mexico Southwest
- North-Central U.S.A.: Oklahoma
- South-Central U.S.A.: Texas
- Southeastern U.S.A.: Alabama, Arkansas, Delaware, Florida, Georgia, Louisiana, Maryland, Mississippi, North Carolina, South Carolina, Tennessee, Virginia
- Brazil: Brazil North, Brazil Northeast, Brazil South, Brazil Southeast, Brazil West-Central
- Caribbean: Cuba, Dominican Republic, Haiti, Jamaica, Leeward Is., Puerto Rico, Trinidad-Tobago, Venezuelan Antilles, Windward Is.,
- Central America: Belize, Costa Rica, El Salvador, Guatemala, Honduras, Nicaragua, Panamá
- Northern South America: French Guiana, Guyana, Suriname, Venezuela
- Southern South America: Argentina Northeast, Paraguay, Uruguay
- Western South America: Bolivia, Colombia, Ecuador, Peru

== Fossil record ==
The oldest fossils of the genus date to the lower Eocene of Europe and North America, with the genus being present in Europe as late as the Pliocene. Fossil seeds of †Symplocos granulosa are frequent in sediment rock layers of the Late Oligocene to the Late Miocene of Denmark, Germany, Austria and Poland. The fossil seeds are very similar to the seeds of the extant southern Chinese species Symplocos glandulifera and Symplocos sulcata. Fossil seeds of †Symplocos paucicostata are known from the Middle Pliocene sediment rock layers in Reuver, the Netherlands, and from the Late Pliocene sediment rock layers in northern Italy. The fossil seeds are very similar to the seeds of the extant East Asian species Symplocos paniculata.

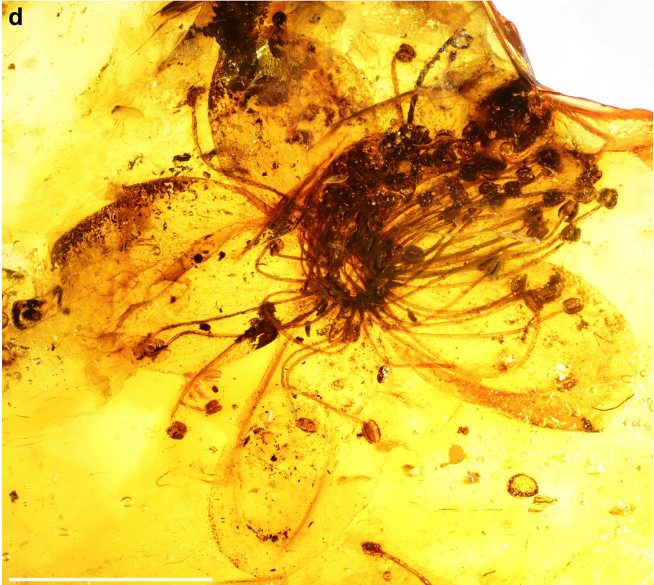
Fossil †Symplocos kowalewskii flower in amber

== Selected species ==
- Symplocos adenophylla
- Symplocos anamallayana
- Symplocos anomala
- Symplocos badia
- Symplocos baehnii
- Symplocos barberi
- Symplocos blancae
- Symplocos bractealis
- Symplocos breedlovei
- Symplocos calycodactylos
- Symplocos candelabrum – Lord Howe Island, Australia
- Symplocos canescens
- Symplocos carmencitae
- Symplocos chloroleuca
- Symplocos clethrifolia
- Symplocos coccinea
- Symplocos cochinchinensis
- Symplocos cordifolia – Sri Lanka
- Symplocos coronata – Sri Lanka
- Symplocos costaricana – Central America
- Symplocos costata
- Symplocos cuneata – Sri Lanka
- Symplocos ecuadorica – Ecuador
- Symplocos fuscata
- Symplocos henschelii
- Symplocos hispidula
- Symplocos junghuhnii
- Symplocos longipes
- Symplocos lugubris
- Symplocos mezii
- Symplocos myrtacea – Japan
- Symplocos nairii
- Symplocos nicolsonii – India
- Symplocos nivea
- Symplocos octopetala
- Symplocos oligandra
- Symplocos paniculata – Japan, South Korea
- Symplocos pendula
- Symplocos peruviana
- Symplocos pluribracteata
- Symplocos pulchra – Sri Lanka
- Symplocos pyriflora
- Symplocos racemosa – China, South Asia
- Symplocos rimbachii
- Symplocos shilanensis
- Symplocos sousae
- Symplocos stawellii – eastern Australia
- Symplocos subandina
- Symplocos tacanensis
- Symplocos thwaitesii – eastern Australia
- Symplocos tinctoria – United States
- Symplocos trichoclada
- Symplocos truncata
- Symplocos tubulifera
- Symplocos verrucisurcula
- Symplocos versicolor

=== Extinct species ===
- †Symplocos kowalewskii Baltic amber, Eocene
