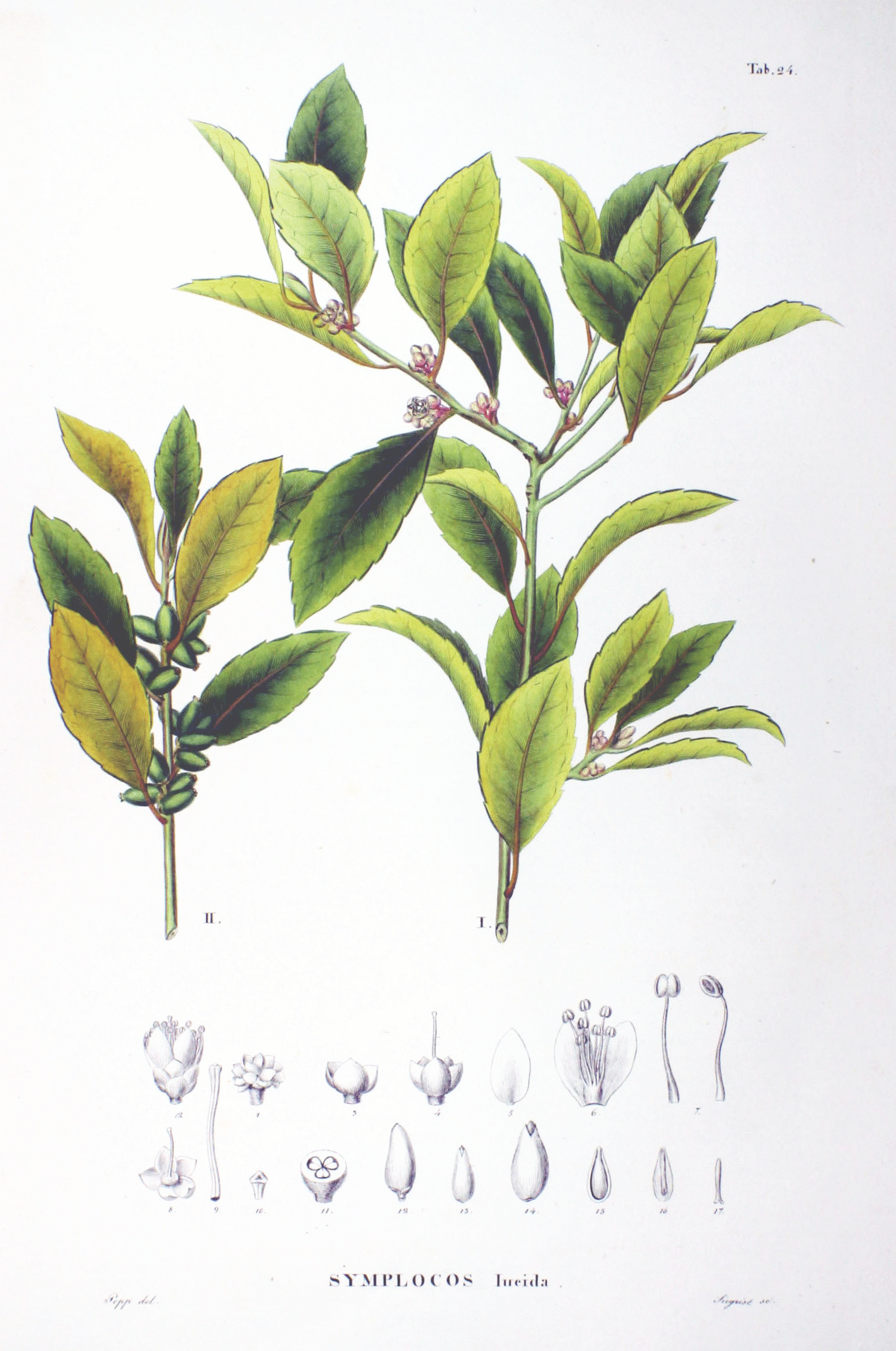
- Symplocos lucida

Scientific classification
- Kingdom: Plantae
- Clade: Tracheophytes
- Clade: Angiosperms
- Clade: Eudicots
- Clade: Asterids
- Order: Ericales
- Family: Symplocaceae; Desf.

Genera
- Symplocos

= Symplocaceae =

Family of flowering plants

Symplocaceae is a family of flowering plants in the order Ericales. It includes a single genus, Symplocos, with about 400 described species. The family has an "amphi-Pacific tropical" distribution, which includes India through to Korea and Japan, mainland and maritime Southeast Asia, eastern Australia, the western Pacific, southeast United States, Central America and much of South America. Plants in the family Symplocaceae are generally trees or shrubs, and are found in humid, tropical, montane forests within their range.

== Description ==
The leaves of Symplocaceae are generally simple and are alternate or spirally arranged. The margin is either dentate, glandular-dentate, or entire. The petioles of the leaves lack stipules at the base.

The flowers of Symplocaceae appear as an inflorescence that is generally axillary but can occasionally be terminal. The inflorescence is a spike, raceme, compact cyme, or thyrsi-panicle. The petals occur in a multiple of three, five, or eleven, and there are three to five sepals. The petals are most often white, but in unusual circumstances maybe yellow.

The fruit of Symplocaceae is a dry drupe. It possesses a lignified endocarp or "stone" which often contains key information when distinguishing between closely related species of Symplocaceae. Symplocaceae endocarps are open at the apex with multiple chambers ranging in number from one to five but generally, three-chambered. These chambers hold seeds and protect them from damage. Most Symplocaceae endocarps have ridging on the surface of the endocarp and a basal pit opposite the open apex.

== Uses ==
While not a chief staple in any large market product, Symplocaceae is used by some groups for specific purposes. One example of the uses of Symplocaceae is that the bark is used as a source of yellow dye in parts of South America. Another use of Symplocaceae is that the roots of some species of the family are used to make tonics.

== Fossil record ==
The fossil record of Symplocaceae is well documented with fossils appearing in the current range as well as in Europe and further into North America. The fossil record does much to confirm the biogeographic connection between North America and East Asia which is already well established in the paleobotanical field. Much of the surviving fossil record is from pollen and the bony endocarps, but leaf imprints exist as well.
