= James Keys =

Australian botanist and schoolteacher

James Keys (19 June 1841 – 26 January 1916) was a school teacher and pioneering 19th century Queensland botanist who was globally recognised for the diverse collections of plant specimens which he assembled from locations of floristic significance throughout his home state including Mt Perry, Bundaberg, Bustard Heads, Burrum River, Eurimbula, Pine Mountain, Lake Cootharaba, Blackall Range and Norman Creek. He was a close friend to Queensland Colonial Botanist F.M. Bailey who was Keys' mentor and was responsible for many of Keys collections of lichens and mosses being sent to specialists in Europe for study. With Bailey's encouragement Keys was to compile a comprehensive collection of plants from the Upper Burnett River and Mount Perry (in the Wide Bay–Burnett region) which culminated in the first local checklist of plants in Queensland from outside of the Brisbane area. Most of his flora collections which were not sent abroad now reside in the Queensland Herbarium where approximately 600 of Keys' collections are presently preserved. Keys was also recognised for his abiding interest in uses of plants and his documentation of the aboriginal plant names in the Mt Perry district were listed in Bailey's seminal 7-volume botanical book 'The Queensland Flora' (1899–1902, 1905).

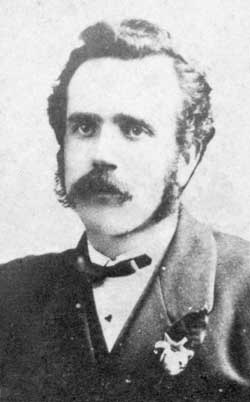
Keys as a young man

Keys first emigrated to Australia from Ireland in 1873 and worked initially as a school teacher in a number of south-eastern Queensland state schools eventually rising to the position of head master at Bundaberg Central Boys School which he held between July 1887 and 1898. Keys was appointed to the position of head teacher at Norman Park State School in Brisbane upon its opening in July 1900, a post which he held until his retirement from the public service around 1904.

Keys was the father of highly decorated Australian nurse Constance Keys and the grandfather of Australian naturalist and conservationist Margaret Thorsborne AO

The plant species Boronia keysii Domin, Hoya keysii F.M.Bailey (now H. australis R.Br.) and Siphonodon australis var. keysii F.M.Bailey (now S. australis var. australis ) were named in honour of Keys.
