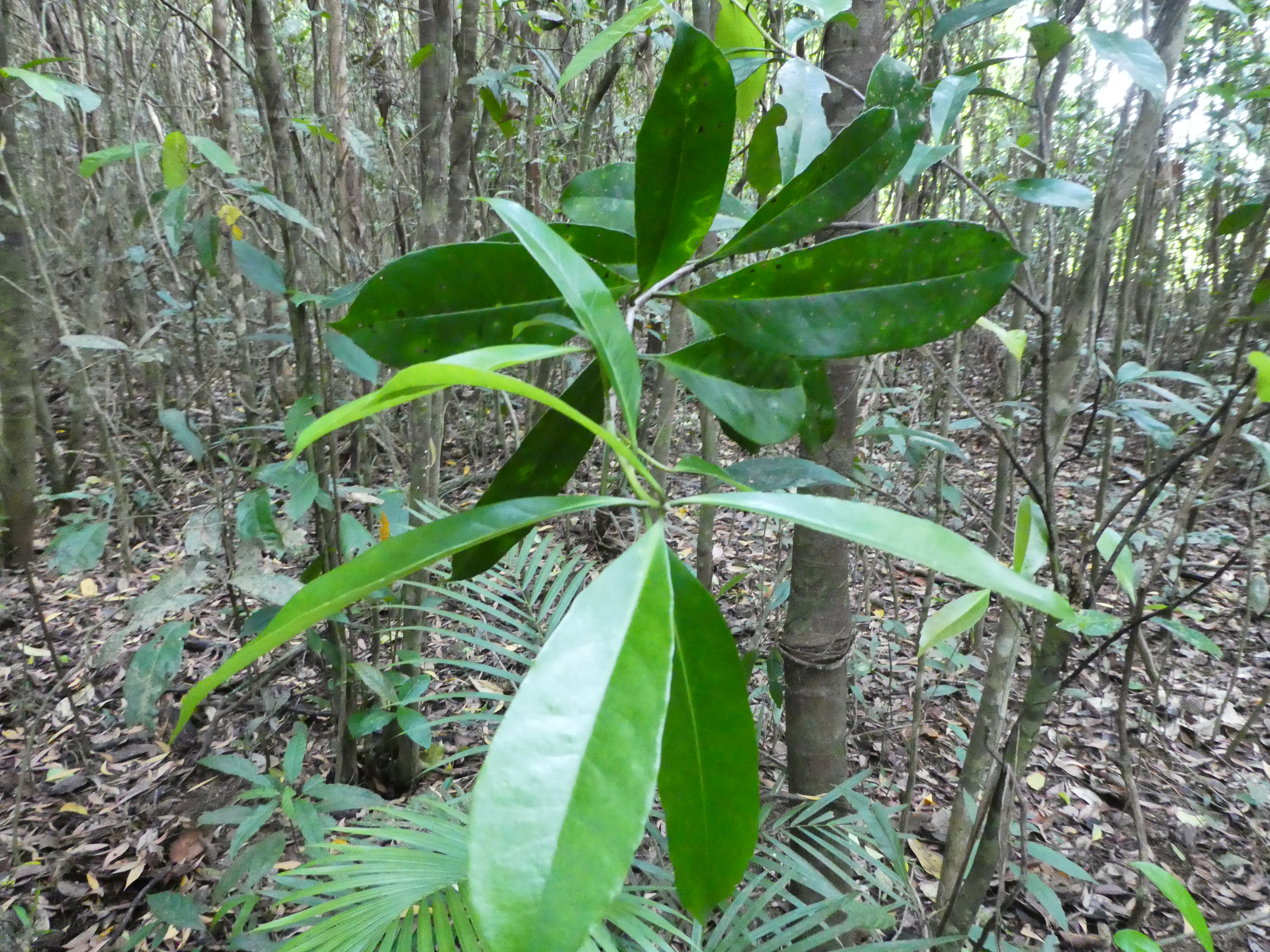
- in Eubenangee Swamp National Park

Conservation status
- Least Concern (NCA)

Scientific classification
- Kingdom: Plantae
- Clade: Embryophytes
- Clade: Tracheophytes
- Clade: Angiosperms
- Clade: Eudicots
- Clade: Asterids
- Order: Ericales
- Family: Symplocaceae
- Genus: Symplocos
- Species: S. puberula

Binomial name
- Symplocos puberula Jessup

Synonyms
- Symplocos cochinchinensis var. pilosiuscula Noot.

= Symplocos puberula =

Species of flowering plant

Symplocos puberula is a species of plant in the family Symplocaceae native to northeastern Queensland, Australia, that was first described in 1982. It is a small rainforest tree and is rated as a least-concern species.

== Description ==
Symplocos puberula is a tree up to 25 m (82 ft) tall with pubescent new growth (i.e. covered in fine soft hairs). The leaves are stiff, widest near the apex and tapered at the base (obovate), and they have a short "drip tip". They measure up to 15 cm (5.9 in) long and 6 cm (2.4 in) wide, and have 6–12 pairs of lateral veins which curve towards the leaf tip and connect to the next vein. The leaf edges are finely toothed in the distal half of the leaf blade.

The inflorescence measures up to 7 cm (2.8 in) long and takes the form of a panicle or a raceme. The white flowers are small – the sepals are about 1.5 mm (0.06 in) long and the petals about 5 mm (0.2 in) long. They have 50 to 70 stamens measuring up to 6 mm (0.24 in) long, and the style is about 4 mm (0.16 in) long. The fruit is a dark blue or black drupe with a persistent calyx at the tip. It measures about 10 mm (0.39 in) long and 6 mm (0.24 in) wide.

== Distribution and habitat ==
This species can be found from the McIlwraith Range near Cooktown, south along the east coast to the area around Eungella. It inhabits well developed rainforest on metamorphic and basalt soils.

== Taxonomy ==
It was first described as Symplocos cochinchinensis var. pilosiuscula by botanist Hans Peter Nooteboom in 1981, and published in the following year. It was later raised to species status by Laurence Woodward Jessup, who disagreed with Nooteboom's treatment of the genus which created many subspecies and varieties. Jessup published his own treatment in the journal Austrobaileya in 2011.

== Conservation ==
This species is listed as least concern in the Queensland Government's WildNet database. No explanation is provided for the assessment. As of August 2026, it has not been assessed by the International Union for Conservation of Nature.

== Gallery ==
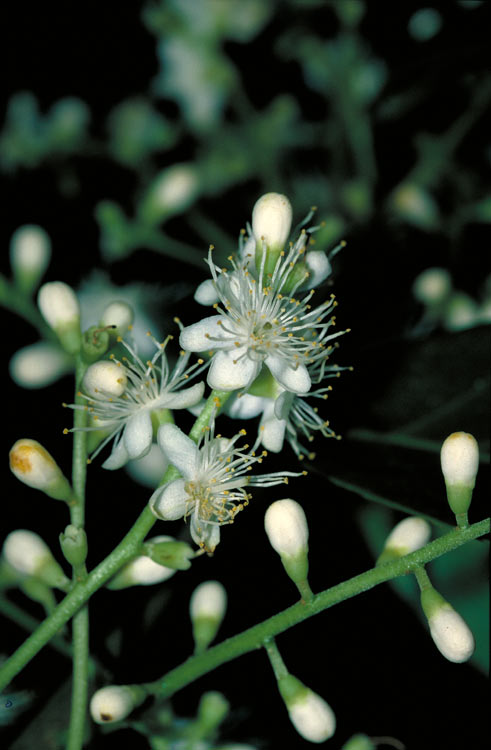
Flowers, close-up

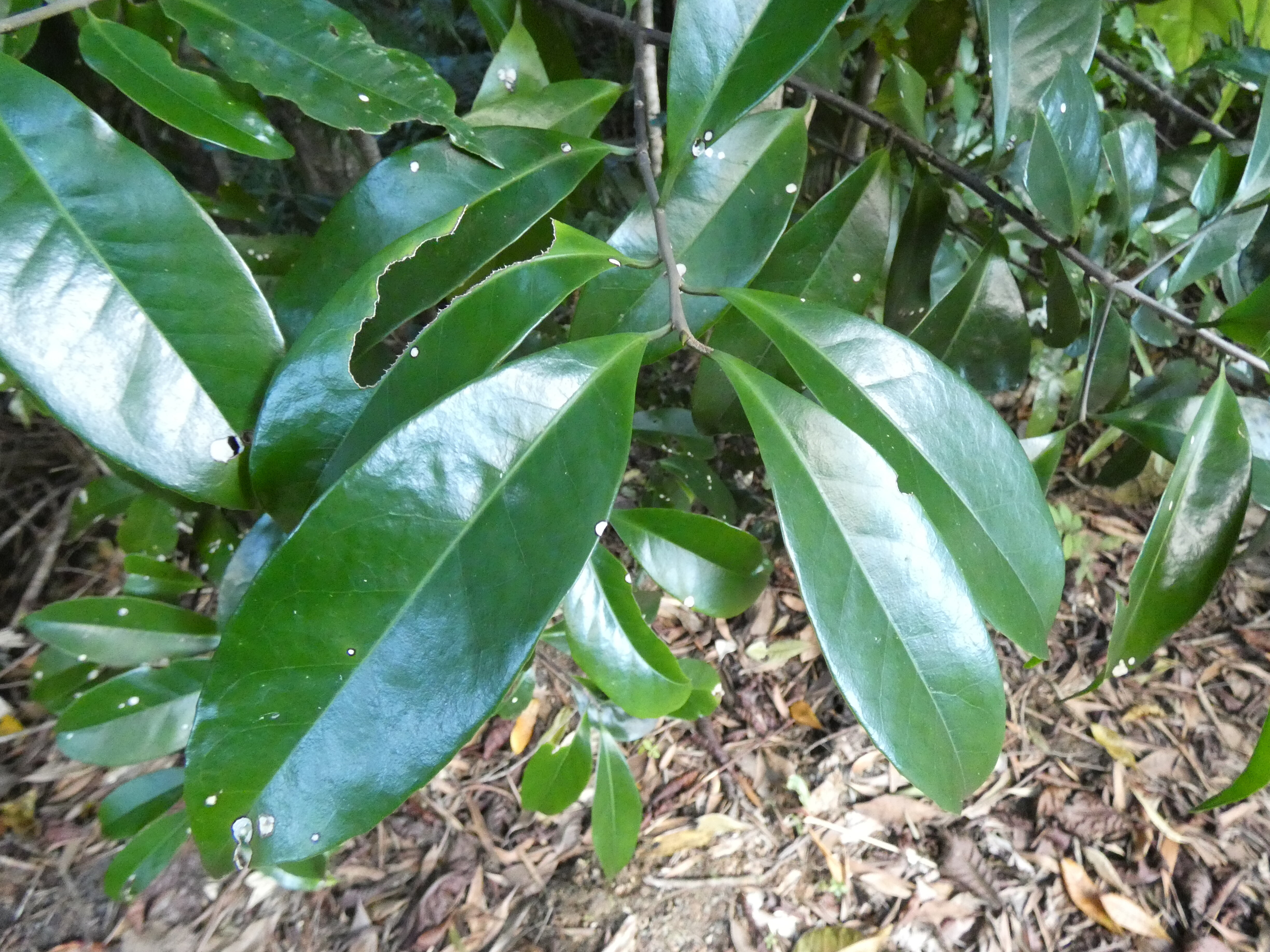
Foliage

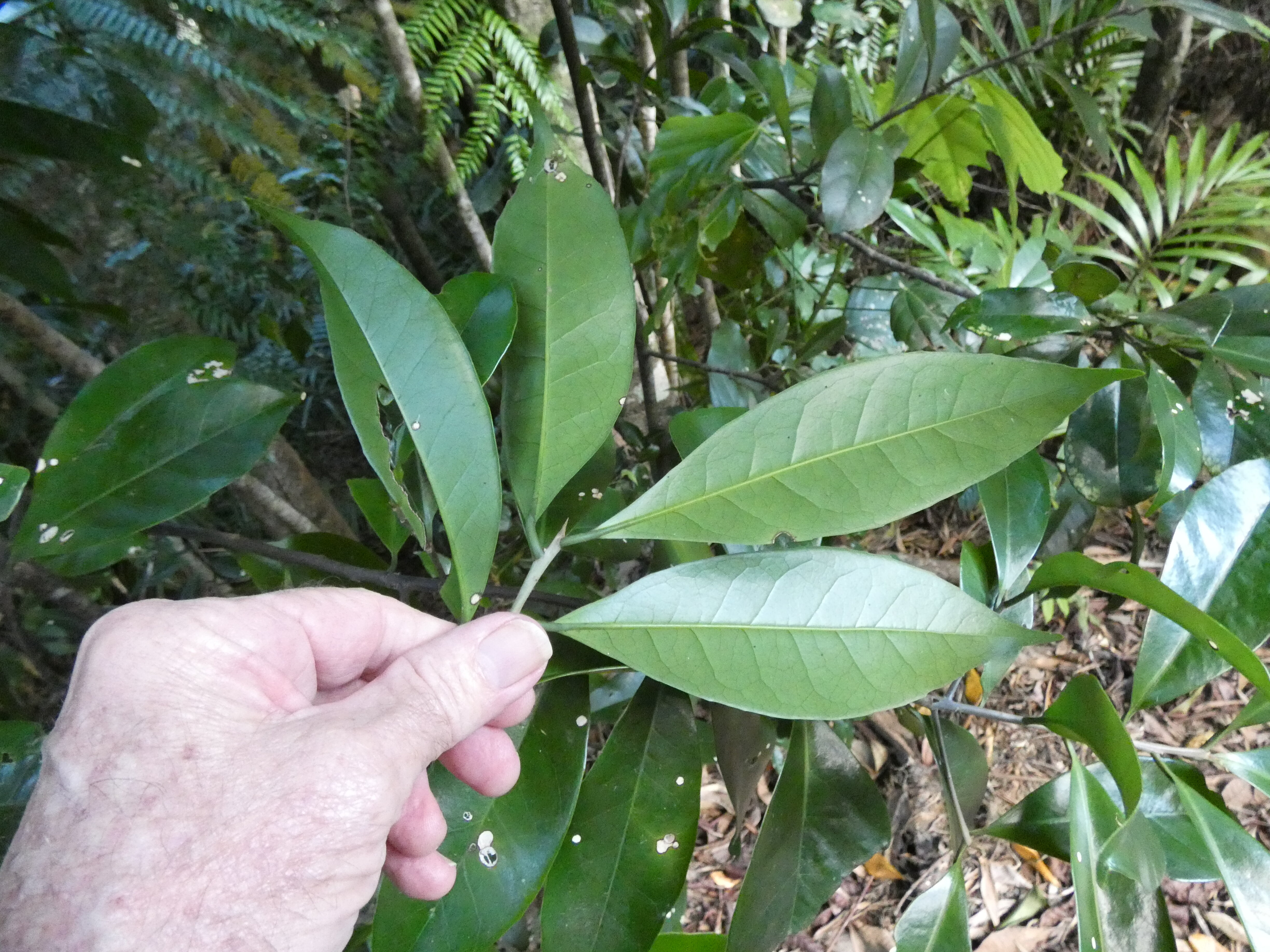
Underside of leaves

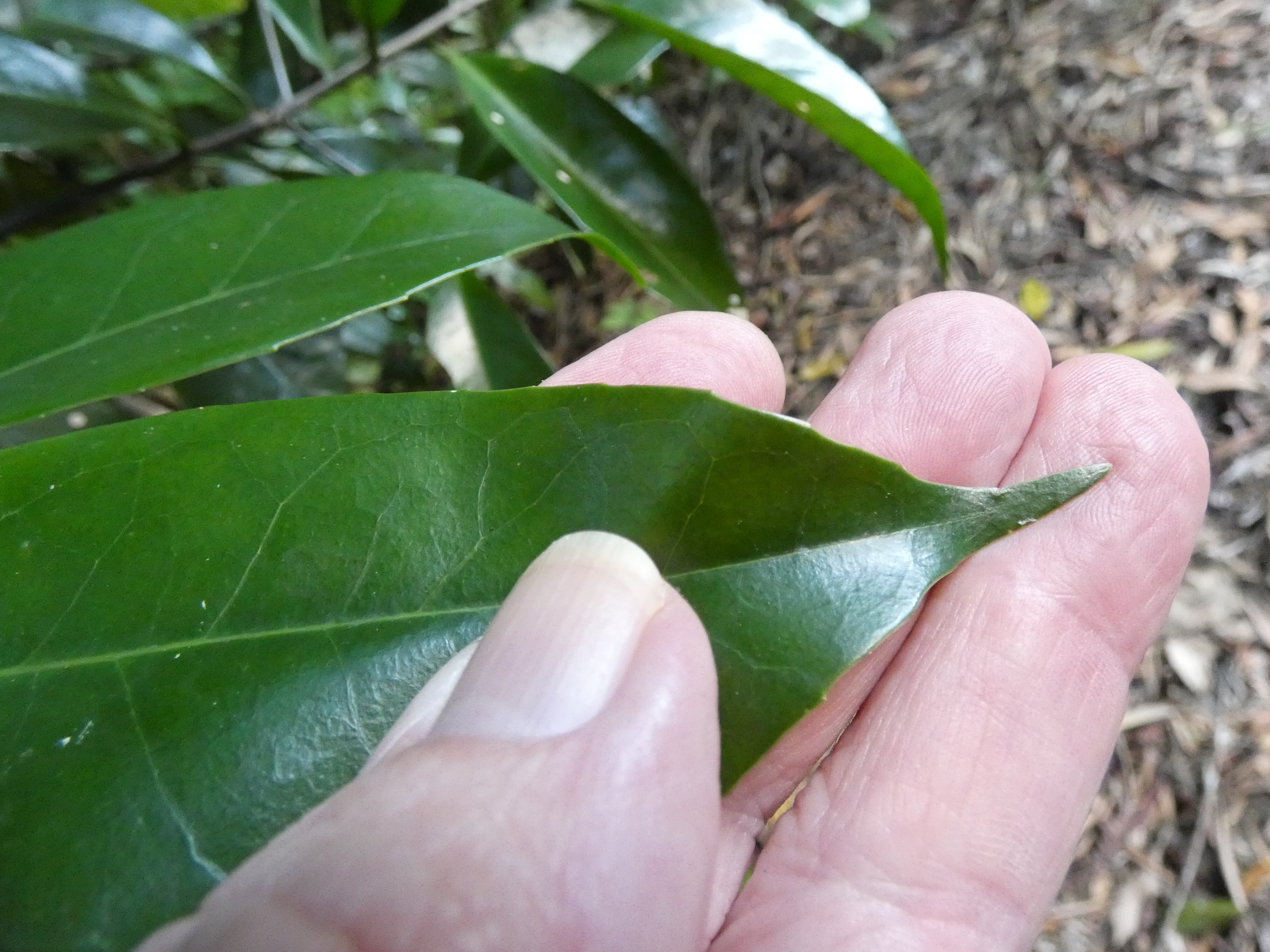
Drip tip

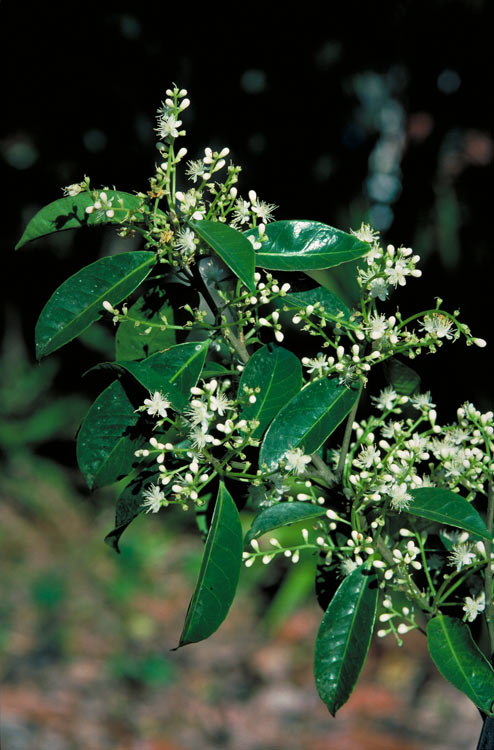
Flowering
