= Johnstone River =

River in Queensland, Australia

Johnstone North Johnstone South Johnstone
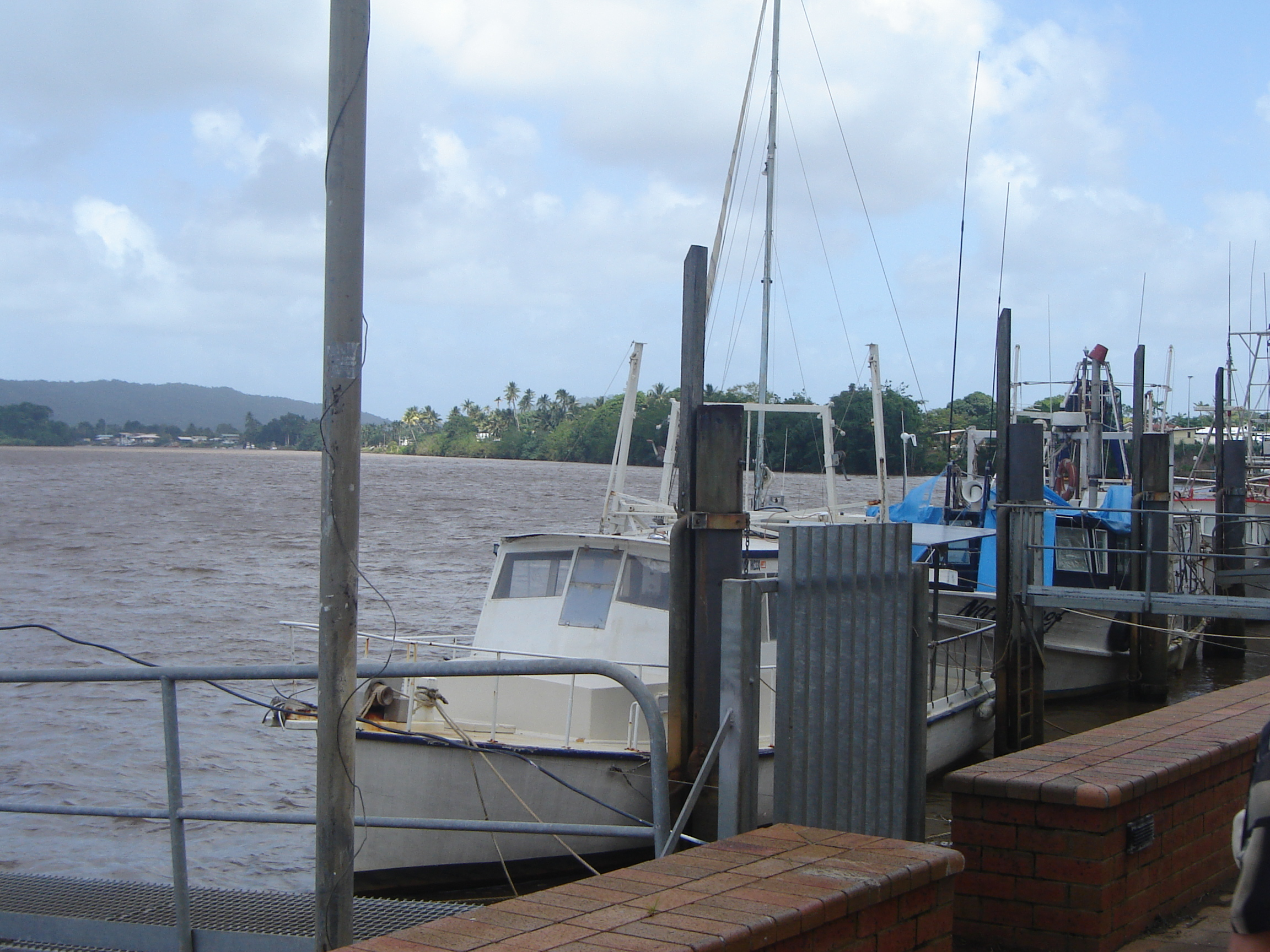
- Johnstone River at Innisfail, 2006

- Location of Johnstone River river mouth in Queensland
- Etymology: Robert Johnstone, a colonial Native Police officer

Location
- Country: Australia
- State: Queensland
- Region: Far North Queensland, North Queensland
- City: Innisfail

Physical characteristics
- Source: Atherton Tableland
- 2nd source: North Johnstone River
  - location: Merivale
  - coordinates: 17°25′24″S 145°31′25″E
  - elevation: 760 m (2,490 ft)
- 3rd source: South Johnstone River
  - location: below Mount Father Clancy
  - coordinates: 17°35′37″S 145°36′32″E
  - elevation: 755 m (2,477 ft)
- Source confluence: South Johnstone River and North Johnstone River
  - location: Innisfail
  - coordinates: 17°31′25″S 146°02′1″E
  - elevation: 1 m (3 ft 3 in)
- Mouth: Coral Sea
  - location: between Flying Fish Point and Coquette Point
  - coordinates: 17°30′39″S 146°04′36″E
  - elevation: 0 m (0 ft)
- Length: 200 km (120 mi)
- Basin size: 1,642.5 km^{2} (634.2 sq mi)
- Discharge
  - location: Near mouth
  - average: 95.6 m^{3}/s (3,020 GL/a)

Basin features
- Tributaries
  - left: North Beatrice River, Ithaca River
  - right: Downey Creek
- Waterfalls: Malanda Falls, Jones Falls, Binda Falls
- National parks: Ella Bay, Eubenangee Swamp, Herberton Range, Japoon, Malaan, Moresby Range, Palmerston Rocks, Topaz Road, Tully Falls, Tully Gorge and Wooroonooran

The Johnstone River, comprising the North Johnstone River and the South Johnstone River, is a river system in Far North and North Queensland, Australia.

The headwaters of the river system rise in the Atherton Tablelands. The north branch of the river system rises below Merivale, flows over the Malanda Falls and through the town of Malanda and then flows generally south by east, around Francis Range and over the Jones Falls, before flowing east, covering a distance of 114 kilometres (71 mi). The south branch of the river system rises below Mount Father Clancy, southwest of Mungalli, and generally flows east over Binda Falls, through the settlement of South Johnstone, before flowing north, covering a distance of 88 kilometres (55 mi). The two rivers reach their confluence to form the Johnstone River east of the town of Innisfail, and just 5 kilometres (3.1 mi) west of the river mouth. The main river then flows east, north of the Moresby Range National Park, and empties into the Coral Sea.

Together, the combined rivers flow over 200 kilometres (120 mi) from source to mouth and descend approximately 760 metres (2,490 ft), with a catchment area of 2,320 square kilometres (900 sq mi). Crocodiles swim and live in all areas in the Johnstone River and swimming is not recommended in any part of the river.

== Course and features ==
The North and South Johnstone Rivers rise in the tablelands of the north tropical coast and flow through steep narrow gorges to their junction on the coastal plain at Innisfail. The head waters of the catchments are located in high rainfall areas and the rivers are capable of producing severe flooding, especially in the Innisfail area. The North and South Johnstone Rivers have a combined catchment area of about 1,600 square kilometres (620 sq mi) at Innisfail; with the North Johnstone being the larger of the two with a catchment of about 1,030 square kilometres (400 sq mi).

Major tributaries of the river system include the North Beatrice River and the Ithaca River that both flow into the North Johnstone River. This branch is the longest and its catchment is drawn from the Malanda Falls Conservation Park, and the following national parks: Ella Bay, Eubenangee Swamp, Herberton Range, Japoon, Malaan, Palmerston Rocks, Topaz Road, Tully Falls, Tully Gorge and Wooroonooran. Malanda Falls is located in the upper reaches of the North Johnstone River. Downey Creek is the only major tributary on the South Johnstone River.

There are no dams or reservoirs in the catchment area. However water is taken from the river for town water supply, dairy farming and sugar cane production.

The river is subject to periodic flooding (on 8 March 2018 it burst its banks, cutting off Innisfail from Cairns), and popular for white-water rafting and other tourist activities.

== History ==
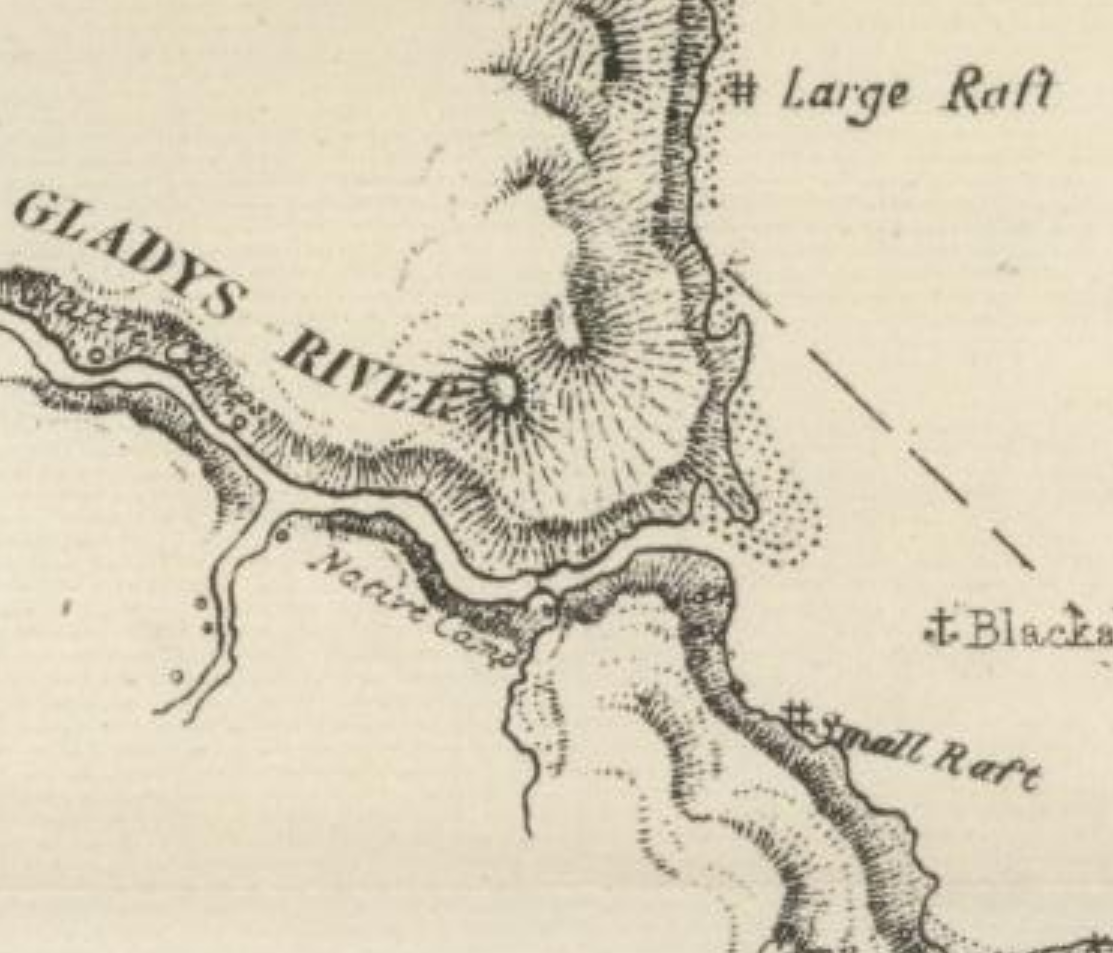
1872 map of the Gladys River (Johnstone River) showing Mamu settlements

The junction of the two river branches is considered to be a sacred area to the indigenous Mamu people.

The area was first identified by colonial Europeans in 1872 by Captain John Morseby during the search for survivors of the shipwreck Maria, when he named the river the Gladys . Later, in 1873, Dalrymple renamed the river after Sub-Inspector Robert Johnstone while he was on an expedition searching for an alternative port for the Palmer River goldfields. Robert Johnstone was along on both trips as the sub-inspector in charge of the Native Mounted Police at Cardwell.

In 1881 the first sugar cane plantation and mill were established at Innisfail after G. E. Dalrymple reported suitable land on the Johnstone River.

== Crossings ==
The Jubilee Bridge was built across the river at Innisfail in 1923, replacing a ferry service. The old Jubilee Bridge was closed on 21 May 2010 after a review found the bridge to be unsafe. A new bridge was opened on 2 September 2011 with a ceremony attended by the then Queensland Premier, Anna Bligh, Queensland MP Curtis Pitt and local Mayor Bill Shannon.

The opening of the railway bridge across the North Johnstone river at Daradgee in December 1924 provided the final link in the North Coast railway line from Townsville to Cairns.

The North Johnstone River also has two crossings on the Bruce Hwy and Shaw Rd.

== See also ==
- List of rivers of Australia § Queensland
- Mosquito Fleet (Johnstone River, Queensland)
- Syzygium erythrocalyx, known as the Johnstone River satinash
