= Coastal Wet Tropics Important Bird Area =

Conservation site in Queensland, Australia

Coordinates: 17°30′55″S 145°59′59″E

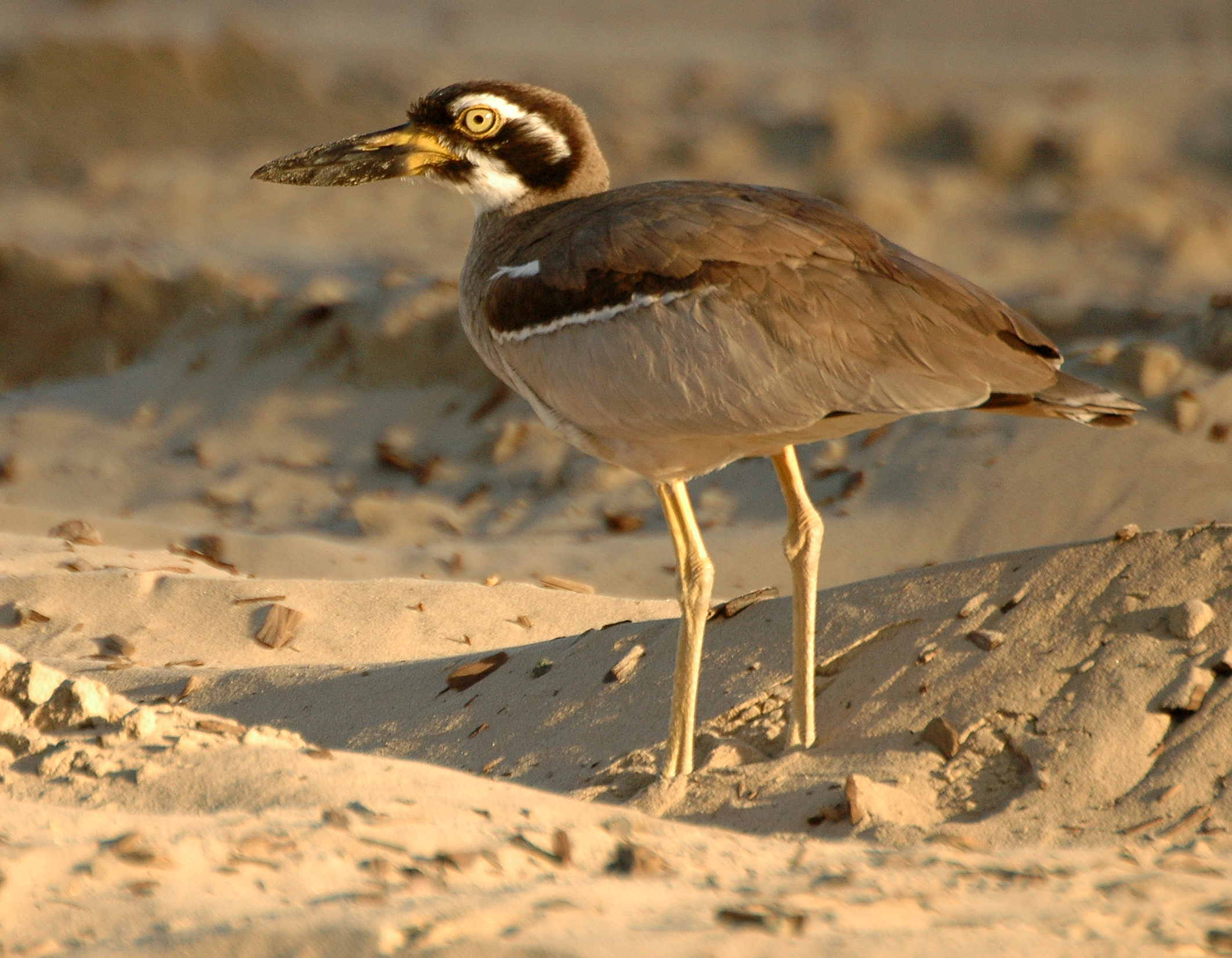
The IBA is important for beach stone-curlews

The Coastal Wet Tropics Important Bird Area comprises a disjunct 521 km^{2} stretch of coastal and subcoastal land in tropical Far North Queensland, Australia. It extends from just south of Cairns in the north for about 150 km to Cardwell in the south. It is important for the conservation of lowland rainforest birds, especially southern cassowaries.

== Description ==
Most of the site is made up of low hills and ranges, with some areas of floodplain forest. The native vegetation is mainly tropical rainforest, with smaller areas of open eucalypt and paperbark forests and mangroves. It includes areas used by the Defence Department, Aboriginal freehold land, national parks and other reserves, as well as unallocated state land. It encompasses the Mission Beach area, which is considered to hold the best cassowary habitat in the Wet Tropics. Other habitats include remote beaches and freshwater wetlands. The site contains, or overlaps with, Clump Mountain, Ella Bay, Eubenangee Swamp, Girramay, Grey Peaks, Hull River, Kurrimine Beach, Maria Creek, Moresby Range, Mount Mackay, Russell River and Tam O'Shanter National Parks. The climate is monsoonal with distinct wet and dry seasons.

== Birds ==
The site has been identified as an Important Bird Area (IBA) by BirdLife International because it contains significant numbers of southern cassowaries. It also supports the rare rufous owl subspecies Ninox rufa queenslandica, as well as populations of beach and bush stone-curlews, yellow and yellow-spotted honeyeaters, fernwrens, Bower's shrike-thrushes and pale-yellow robins.
