= Margaret Thorsborne =

Australian naturalist (1927–2018)

Margaret Grace Thorsborne AO (3 June 1927 – 16 October 2018) was an Australian naturalist, conservationist and environmental activist. She was notable for her efforts, with her husband Arthur Thorsborne, in initiating the long-term monitoring and protection of the Torresian imperial-pigeon on the Brook Islands, north east of Hinchinbrook Island, Far North Queensland. Toward the end of her life, she was involved in the struggle to protect Queensland's Wet Tropics World Heritage Area and animals such as the southern cassowary, mahogany glider and dugong.

== Early life ==
Margaret Kemp-Pennefather was born in 1927, the daughter of Lionel Hugh Kemp-Pennefather and his wife, the highly decorated Australian nurse Constance (née Keys).She is also the granddaughter of the botanist and schoolteacher James Keys.

Margaret married Arthur Thorsborne in 1963. Then living on Queensland's Gold Coast, they were foundation members and office bearers of the Gold Coast branch of the Wildlife Preservation Society of Queensland.

== Hinchinbrook ==
The Thorsbornes began visiting Hinchinbrook Island in 1964. In 1972 they settled at Meunga Creek, near Cardwell, on a property ("Galmara") consisting mainly of coastal wetlands and rainforest facing Hinchinbrook Island across the Hinchinbrook Channel. The property was given in 1980 to the Queensland National Parks and Wildlife Service to extend the Edmund Kennedy National Park. Arthur Thorsborne died in 1991. The Thorsbornes are commemorated in the Thorsborne Trail, a popular 32 km walking track on Hinchinbrook Island.

== Pigeon protection ==
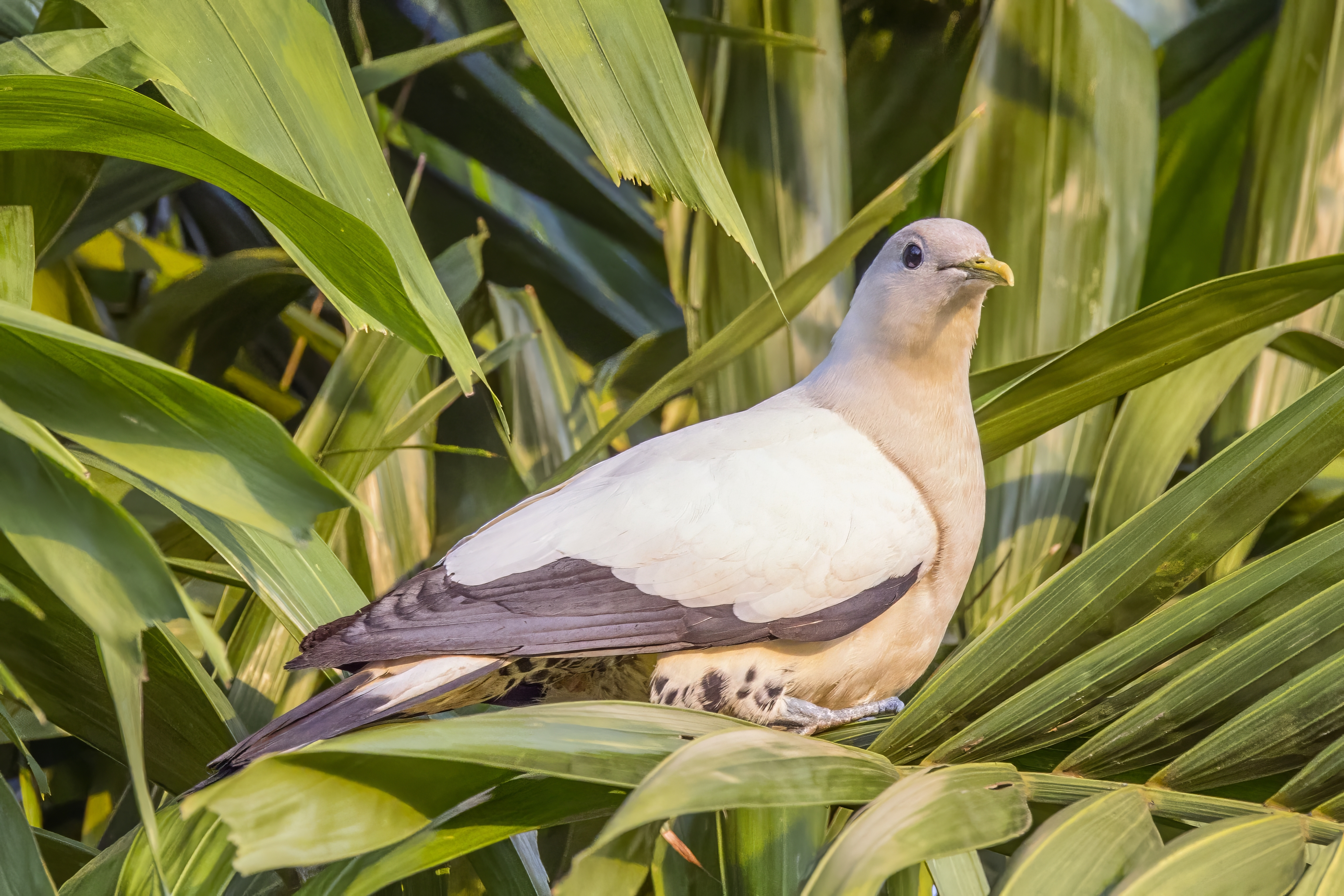
Torresian imperial-pigeon (Ducula spilorrhoa)

Starting in 1965, an early conservation initiative by the Thorsbornes was a long-term and ongoing monitoring program for Torresian imperial-pigeons on the Brook Islands near Hinchinbrook, the southernmost breeding area of the species, to which the pigeons arrive in August every year, departing northwards in March after the breeding season. Though breeding mainly on the islands, the pigeons fly daily to the nearby mainland, as well as to Hinchinbrook Island, to feed on rainforest fruits, including figs and nutmegs. Although the pigeons have been officially protected by law since 1877, birds were still regularly, intensively and illegally shot as they returned in the evening to feed their chicks on the island nesting colonies, and the number of breeding birds had dropped to 3,000 by the time the Thorsbornes intervened. The monitoring program required a regular presence on the island and acted not only to quantify population changes but also to protect the colony. Later, as the population recovered and more help was required to conduct the counting, Margaret and Arthur began a long-term collaboration with John Winter (Zoologist) from the Queensland National Parks and Wildlife Service. Winter facilitated a reorganisation of the counting system and an increase in the degree of government support available to the project. Since 1965, the illegal shooting has declined and pigeon numbers have increased to over 40,000.

== Political art ==
Margaret painted over 2,500 envelopes which she sent to friends, politicians and government agencies, often with conservation messages such 'Azure kingfishers need tree-lined streams', and matching stamps. Her cards were sold at several centres in the region to raise money for conservation.

== Honours ==
- 1998 – WPSA Serventy Conservation Medal
- 2001 – Centenary Medal for distinguished service to conservation and the environment.
- 2006 – Queensland Natural History Award
- 2011 – Officer of the Order of Australia for distinguished service to conservation and the environment through advocacy roles for the protection and preservation of wildlife and significant natural heritage sites in Australia, as a supporter of scientific research, and to the Wildlife Preservation Society of Queensland.

== Legacy ==
Tetrastigma thorsborneorum, a vine in the grape family from north Queensland, was named in honour of Margaret and Arthur Thorsborne.
