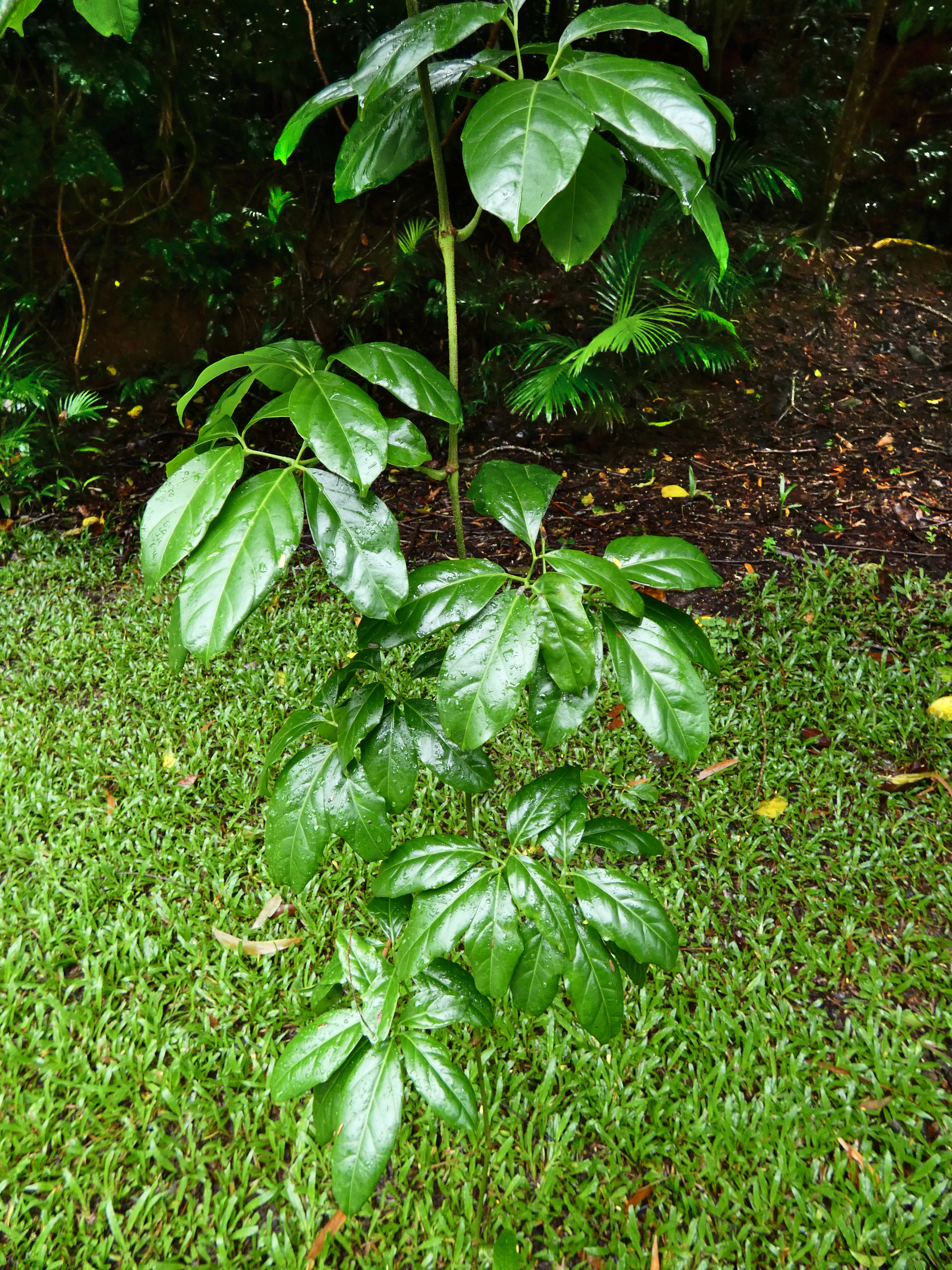
- Vine in Cairns, Queensland

Conservation status
- Least Concern (NCA)

Scientific classification
- Kingdom: Plantae
- Clade: Tracheophytes
- Clade: Angiosperms
- Clade: Eudicots
- Clade: Rosids
- Order: Vitales
- Family: Vitaceae
- Genus: Tetrastigma
- Species: T. thorsborneorum

Binomial name
- Tetrastigma thorsborneorum Jackes

= Tetrastigma thorsborneorum =

Species of flowering plant

Tetrastigma thorsborneorum is a species of plant in the grape family Vitaceae. It is native to the northern half of Queensland, Australia. First described in 1989, it is considered to be a least-concern species.

== Description ==
Tetrastigma thorsborneorum is a tendril climber, becoming woody and striate with age, with a stem diameter up to 5 cm (2.0 in). Lenticels are prominent even on young shoots. The compound leaves are pedately divided with between five and eleven leaflets, although five or seven are the most common numbers. The tendrils grow from the stem on the opposite side to the leaves and are once-divided.

Inflorescences are produced in the leaf axils. This species is dioecious, meaning that pistillate (functionally female) and staminate (functionally male) flowers are borne on separate plants. Staminate inflorescences are about 5 cm (2.0 in) long, with pale, tightly backward-curving petals about 2 mm (0.08 in) long; pistillate inflorescences about 7 cm (2.8 in) long, petals about 2.2 mm (0.09 in) long, ovary conical and 1.5 mm (0.06 in) long, stigma with four spreading lobes. Calyx for both about 0.5 mm (0.02 in) long.

The fruit is a dark blue to black, globular berry about 1.2 cm (0.5 in) long and 1 cm (0.4 in) wide, containing a single ovoid seed about 7 mm (0.3 in) wide and long.

== Distribution and habitat ==
This vine grows in drier rainforest types such as monsoon forest and vine thickets, on a variety of soil types. The geographical range is eastern Queensland from Kutini-Payamu (Iron Range) National Park on Cape York Peninsula, southwards to Airlie Beach. The altitudinal range is from sea level to about 450 m (1,480 ft).

== Taxonomy ==
This species was described in 1989 by Australian botanist Betsy Rivers Jackes, in the final paper of a five-part review of Australian Vitaceae published in the journal Austrobaileya.

=== Etymology ===
The genus name Tetrastigma refers to the four-lobed stigma seen in the species, while the species epithet thorsborneorum was chosen in honour of Margaret Thorsborne and her husband Arthur, well-known naturalists and conservationists who first collected fertile specimens of the plant.

== Conservation ==
This species is listed as least concern under the Queensland Government's Nature Conservation Act. As of 16 April 2026, it has not been assessed by the International Union for Conservation of Nature (IUCN).

== Gallery ==
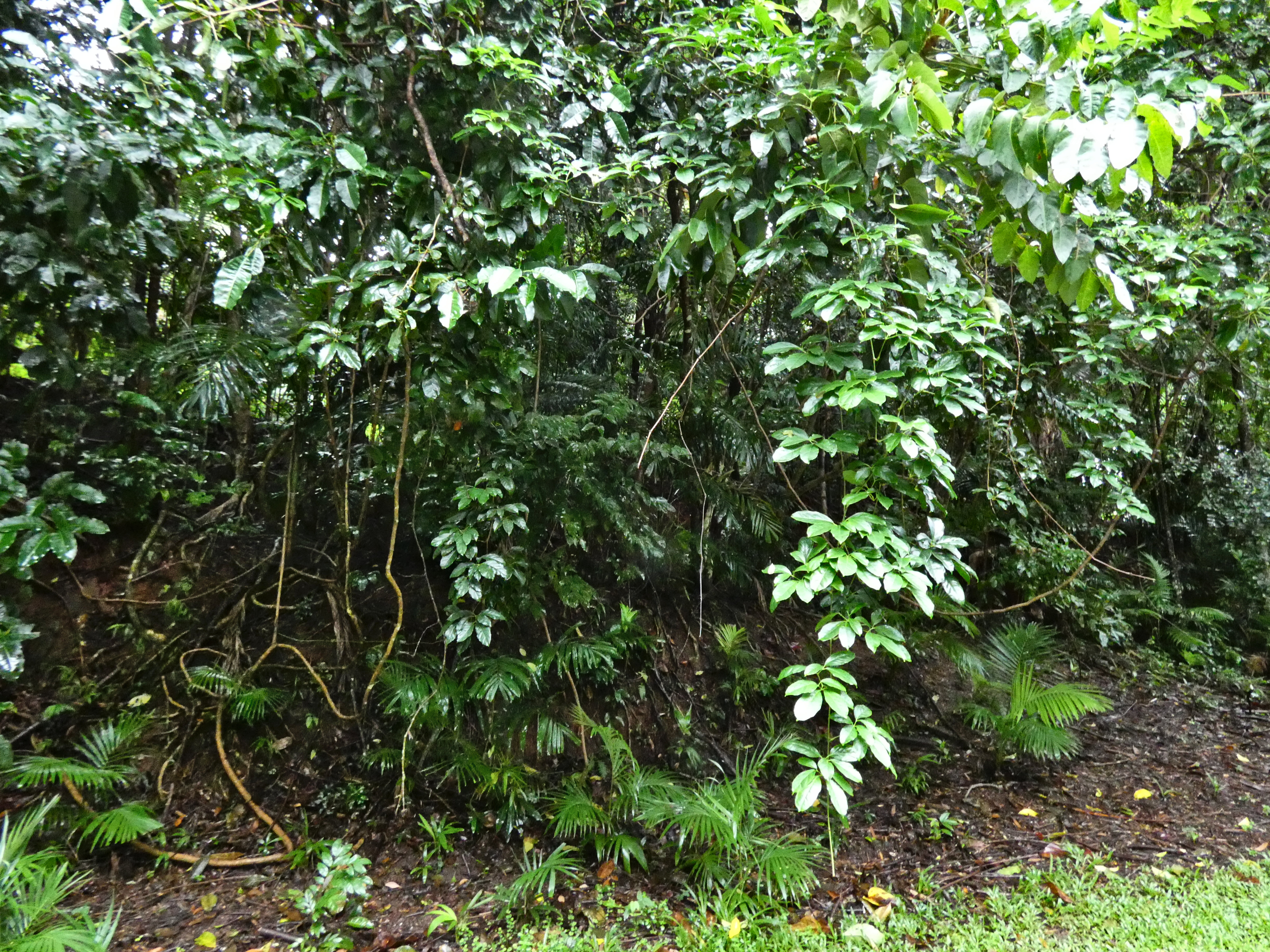
Habit

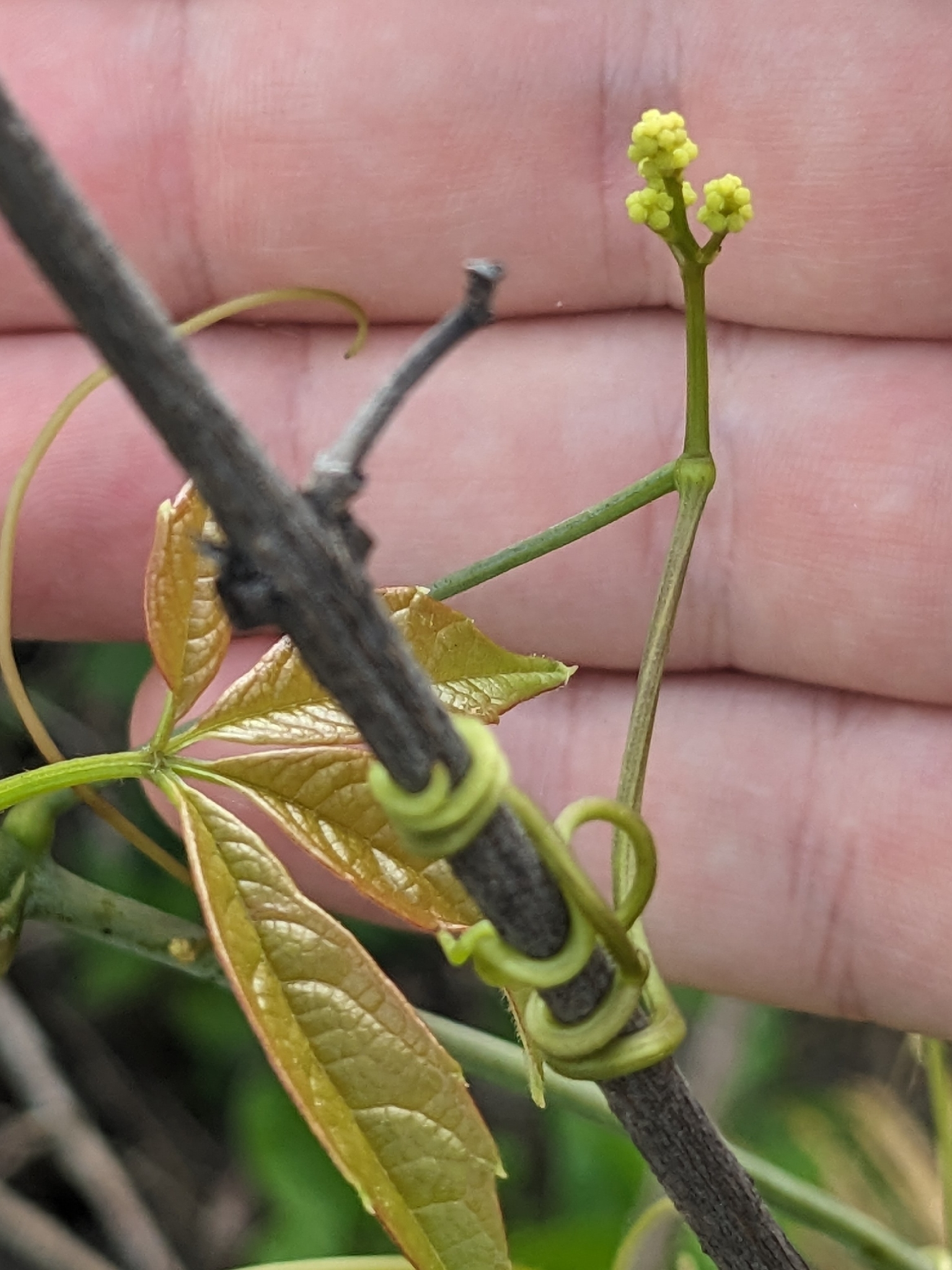
Flower buds

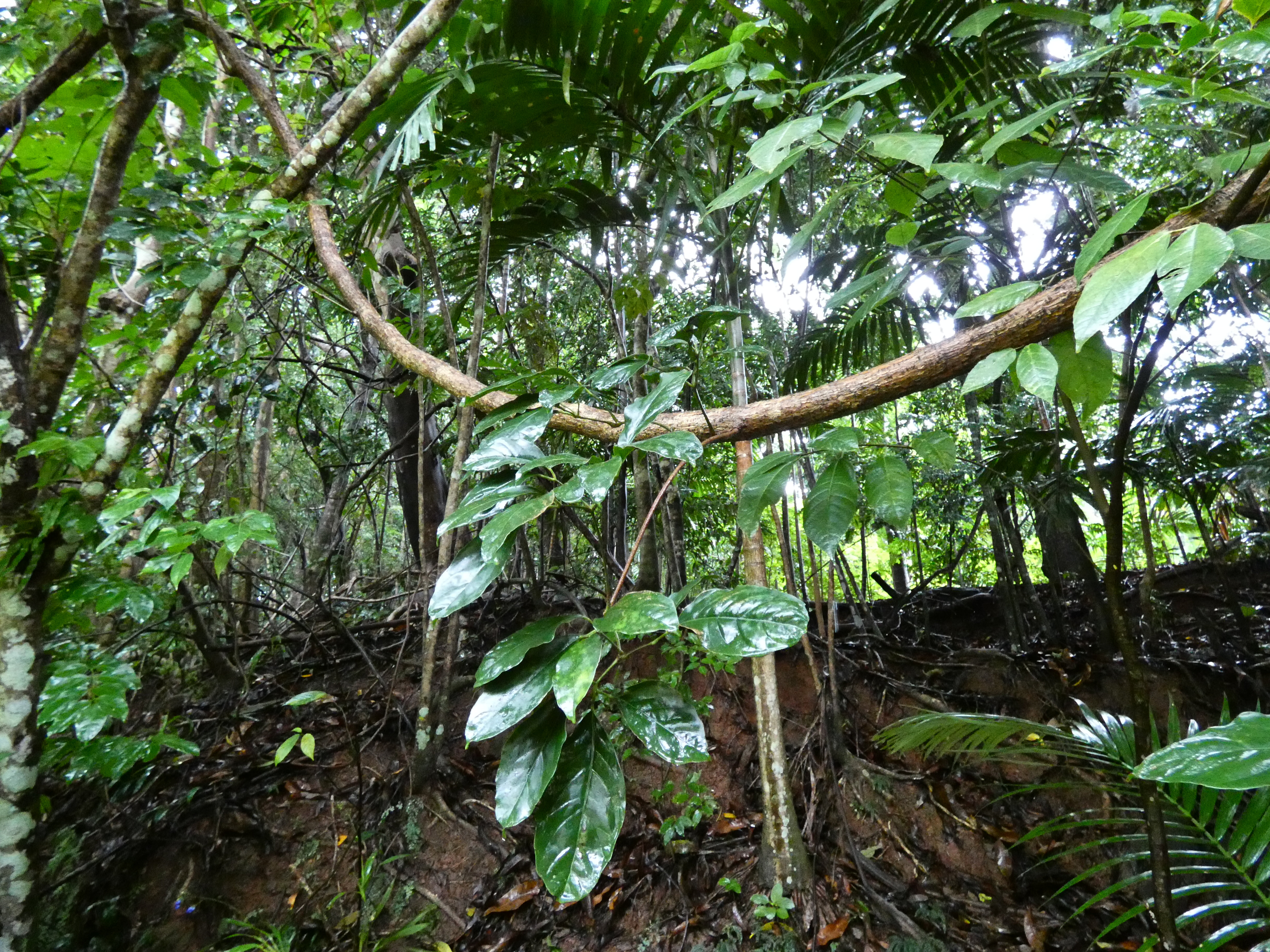
Vine stem

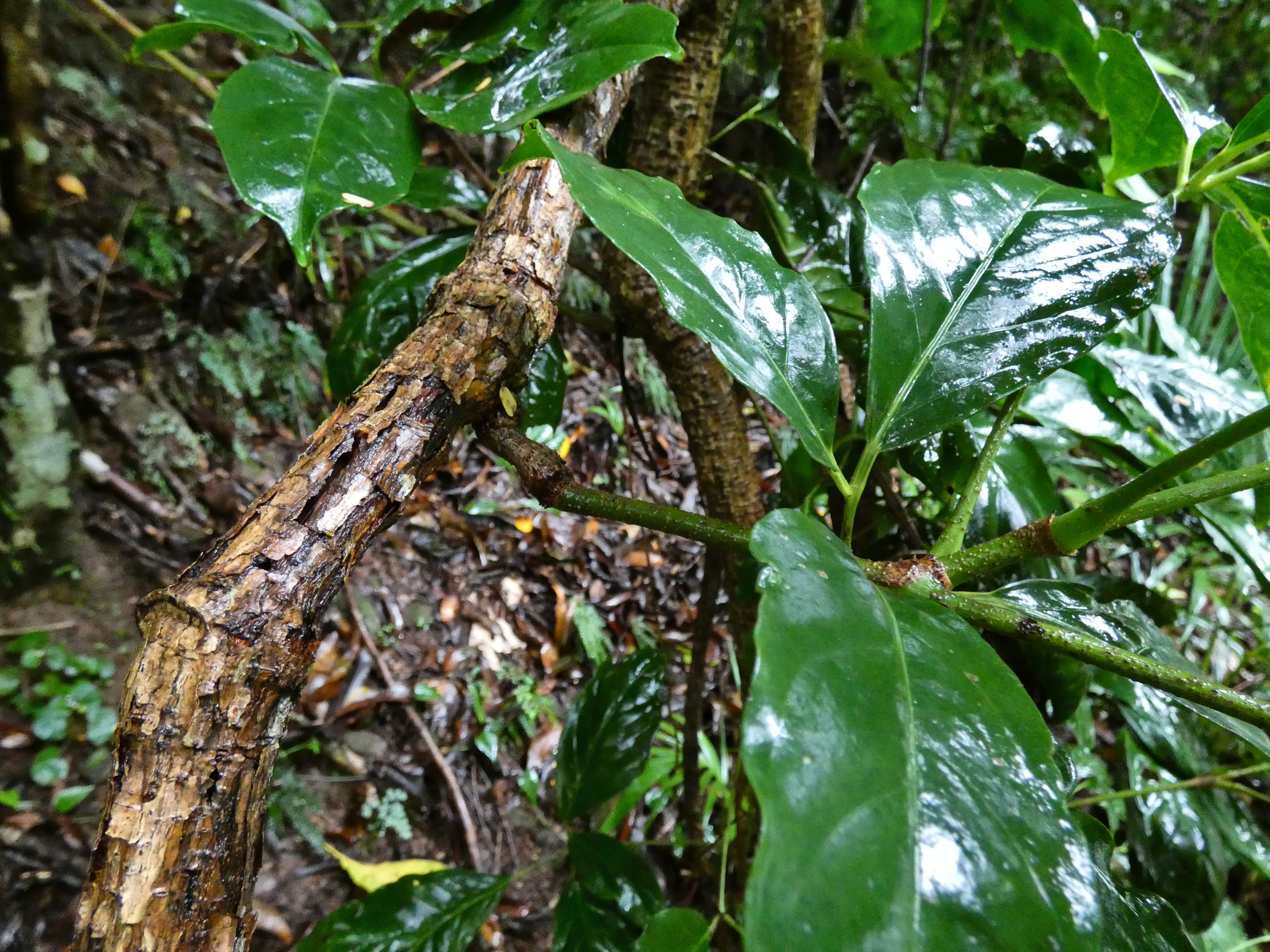
Stem and petiole
