= Eubenangee Swamp National Park =

National park in Australia

- IUCN category II (national park)
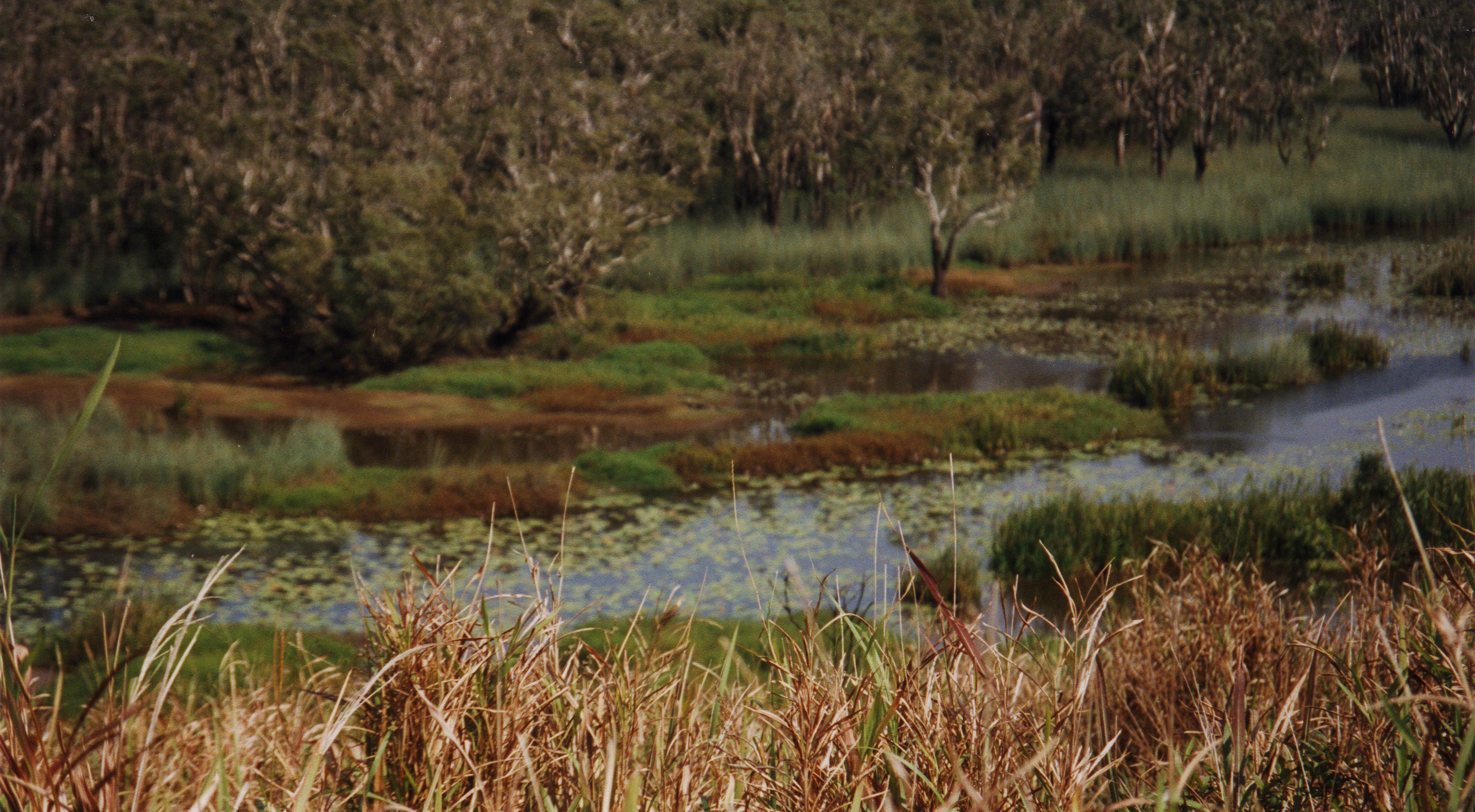
- Eubenangee Swamp, 2001

- Location within Queensland
- Location: Queensland
- Nearest city: Innisfail
- Coordinates: 17°25′24″S 145°57′25″E
- Area: 17.2 km^{2} (6.6 sq mi)
- Established: 1968
- Governing body: Queensland Parks and Wildlife Service
- Website: Official website

Eubenangee Swamp is a national park in Eubenangee in the Cairns Region, Queensland, Australia, 1332 km northwest of Brisbane. It is part of the Coastal Wet Tropics Important Bird Area, identified as such by BirdLife International because of its importance for the conservation of lowland tropical rainforest birds. It plays home to over 190 species of birds.

The national park is found within the water catchment areas of the North Johnstone and Russell Rivers and is part of the Wet Tropics of Queensland bioregion.

The average elevation of terrain is 24 metres. This national park is characterized by high annual rainfall, and this is most pronounced from December to April.

== Vegetation ==
Eubenangee Swamp National Park represents an intricate mosaic of diverse and regionally rare vegetation types. Melaleuca woodlands and forests (Type 56a, 56d) dominate the majority of the western and eastern margins of the park whilst the central band, which spans its northern to southern boundaries, contains a variety of mesophyll vine forest communities (Types 2a, 2c) as well as feather palm dominated seasonal swamp forests (Type 4b).

Sedgelands (Types 69c, 69e) are located in semi-permanent swamp areas in a number of zones running adjacent to the northern to eastern boundary limits. Grasslands (Types 68a, 68b, 68c), including critically endangered Hemarthria uncinata dominated communities, are interspersed in pockets throughout this area growing upon seasonally inundated alluvial soils.

== See also ==
- Protected areas of Queensland
