= Constance Keys =

Australian nurse

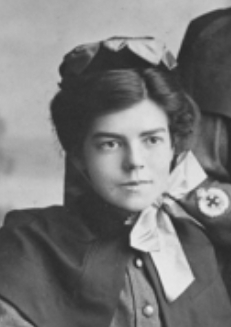
- Keys in 1914, before embarking for overseas service
- Born: Constance Mabel Keys; 30 October 1886; Mount Perry, Queensland
- Died: 17 March 1964 (aged 77); Southport, Queensland
- Relatives: James Keys (father); Margaret Thorsborne (daughter)
- Military career
- Allegiance: Australia
- Branch: Australian Imperial Force
- Service years: 1914–1919
- Rank: Head Sister
- Conflicts: First World War
- Awards: Royal Red Cross; Mentioned in Despatches (2); Military Health Service honour medal (France)

Constance Mabel Kemp-Pennefather, RRC (née Keys; 30 October 1886 – 17 March 1964) was a decorated Australian nurse of the First World War. She was mentioned twice in despatches, was awarded the Royal Red Cross, First Class and the French Military Health Service honour medal.

== Biography ==
Keys was born in Mount Perry, a small town in the Wide Bay–Burnett region of Queensland, the seventh child of Irish immigrant James Keys, a schoolteacher and botanist, and his wife Margaret. Trained at the Brisbane General Hospital as a nurse, she enlisted in the Australian Imperial Force in September 1914 and was posted to the Australian Army Nursing Service. She was sent first to Egypt, later travelling onto Britain and then to France. She married Lionel Hugh Kemp-Pennefather on 3 December 1921, and was the mother of Australian naturalist and conservationist Margaret Thorsborne.
