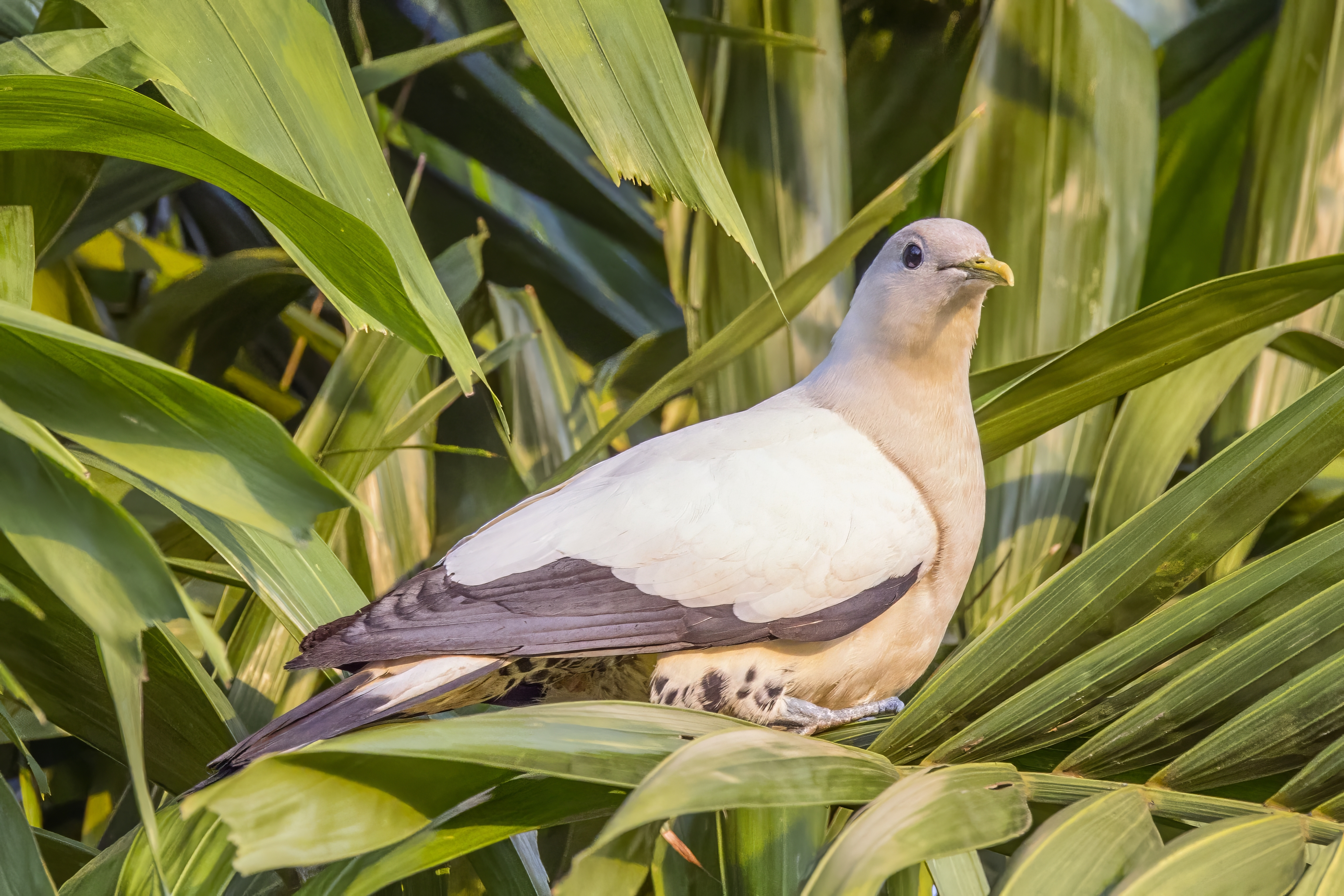
- George Brown Darwin Botanic Gardens

Conservation status
- Least Concern (IUCN 3.1)

Scientific classification
- Kingdom: Animalia
- Phylum: Chordata
- Class: Aves
- Order: Columbiformes
- Family: Columbidae
- Genus: Ducula
- Species: D. spilorrhoa

Binomial name
- Ducula spilorrhoa (Gray, 1858)

= Torresian imperial pigeon =

Species of bird

The Torresian imperial pigeon (Ducula spilorrhoa), also known as the nutmeg pigeon, white nutmeg pigeon, Australian pied imperial pigeon or Torres Strait pigeon (Meriam Mir: deumer), is a relatively large, pied species of pigeon. It is found in forest, woodland, savanna, mangrove and scrub in Australia (north-east Western Australia, north Northern Territory and north Queensland, including the Torres Strait Islands), New Guinea, Aru Islands, islands in the Geelvink Bay, D'Entrecasteaux Islands and Louisiade Archipelago.

It has been recorded as a vagrant in New South Wales, Australia. As far as known, most populations are resident or only take part in minor local movements. The population in Queensland leaves for New Guinea in February–April and returns in July–August.

== Description ==
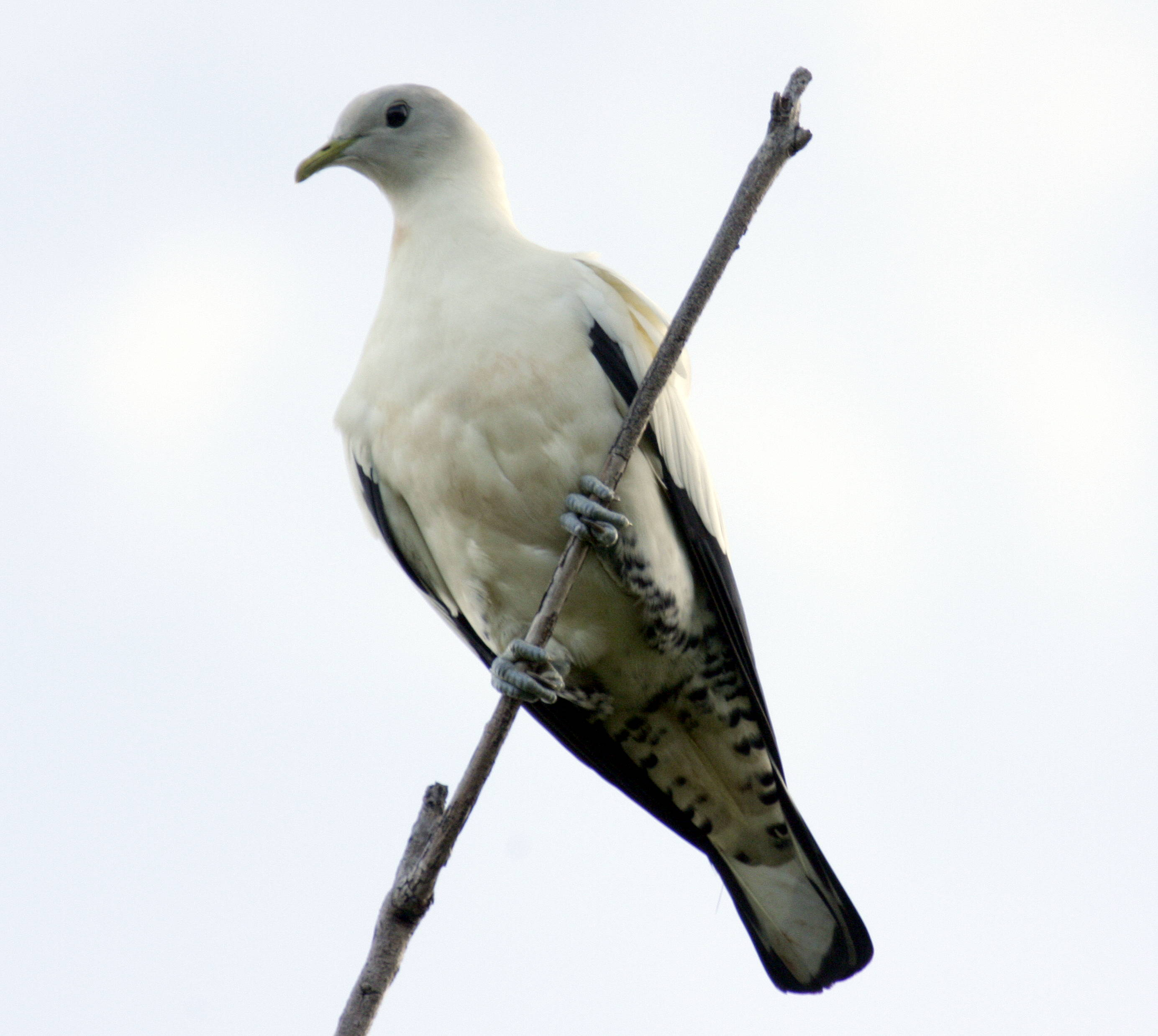
A Torresian imperial pigeon at Cairns Esplanade, north Queensland, Australia

The Torresian imperial pigeon is a large plump pigeon, 38–44 centimetres (15–17.5 inches) in length, and with a 45 cm (18 in) wingspan. It is entirely white or pale cream, apart from the black flight feathers (remiges), part of the tail (rectrices) and spots on the undertail coverts. The head can be brown, soiled by eating fruit.

== Behaviour ==
The flight of the pigeon is fast and direct, with the regular beats and an occasional sharp flick of the wings which are characteristic of pigeons in general.

=== Breeding ===
The male displays by flying up steeply, pausing, tipping forward and then gliding downwards. The female builds an untidy stick nest in a tree, usually a coconut palm and lays a single white egg, which hatches within 26 to 28 days. The squab fledges after another three weeks. In Australia they breed between August and January in mangroves, vines, palm fronds on off-shore islands, such as the Brook Islands. In north-east Queensland, they migrate daily as flocks from the islands to the mainland rainforests to eat fruit, returning to the islands at dusk.

=== Feeding ===
This is an arboreal dove, feeding almost exclusively on fruit. It can swallow fruits with very large seeds, the latter being regurgitated or excreted whole, depending on size, after the pulp has been removed.

=== Calls ===
Calls made by the birds are a deep "mrrrooooo", "roo-ca-hoo" and "up-ooooo".

== Taxonomy ==
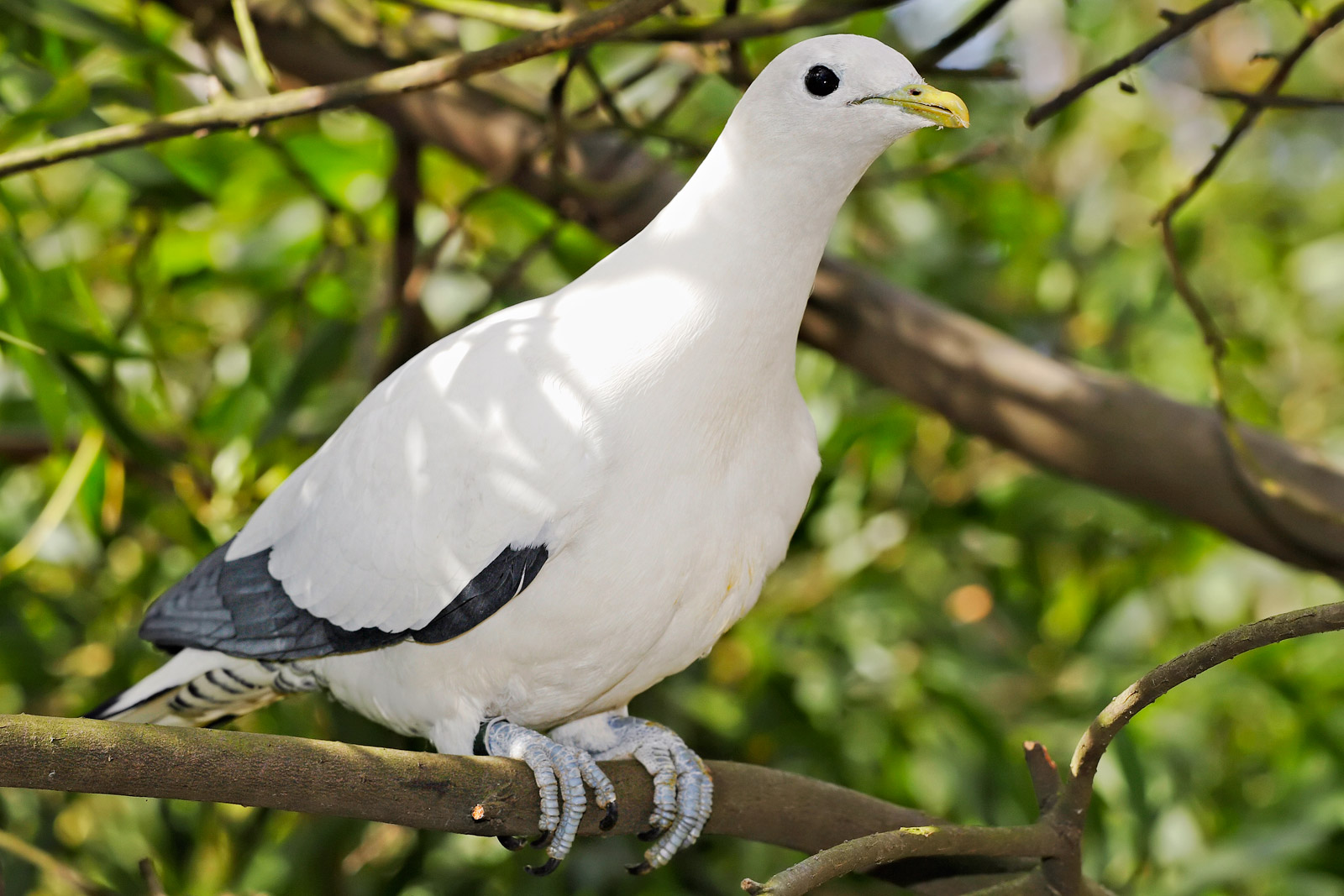
A Torresian imperial pigeon in Melbourne Zoo. Notice the greenish-yellow bill and the black spotting to the undertail coverts.

Its taxonomy is confusing and remains unsettled. It has sometimes been considered a subspecies of the pied imperial pigeon. When recognized as a separate species, the number of subspecies of the Torresian imperial pigeon also remains unsettled. Many recognize two: The widespread D. s. spilorrhoa (nominate) and D. s. constans of the Kimberleys. However, the latter is sometimes considered a junior synonym of former. Alternatively, it has been argued that it should be considered a separate species, the Kimberley imperial-pigeon (D. constans Bruce, 1989).

Two additional taxa, subflavescens of the Bismarck Archipelago and melanura of the Moluccas, have been associated with the Torresian imperial pigeon. The former has a distinctive yellowish-tinged plumage and a bluish basal half of the bill, and is increasingly treated as a separate species, the yellowish imperial pigeon (D. subflavescens). Most recent authorities place melanura under the pied imperial pigeon, but it has black spotting to the undertail coverts and a greenish-yellow bill similar to the Torresian imperial pigeon. However, melanura also has a significantly broader black tail-tip than the Torresian imperial pigeon.

== Status ==
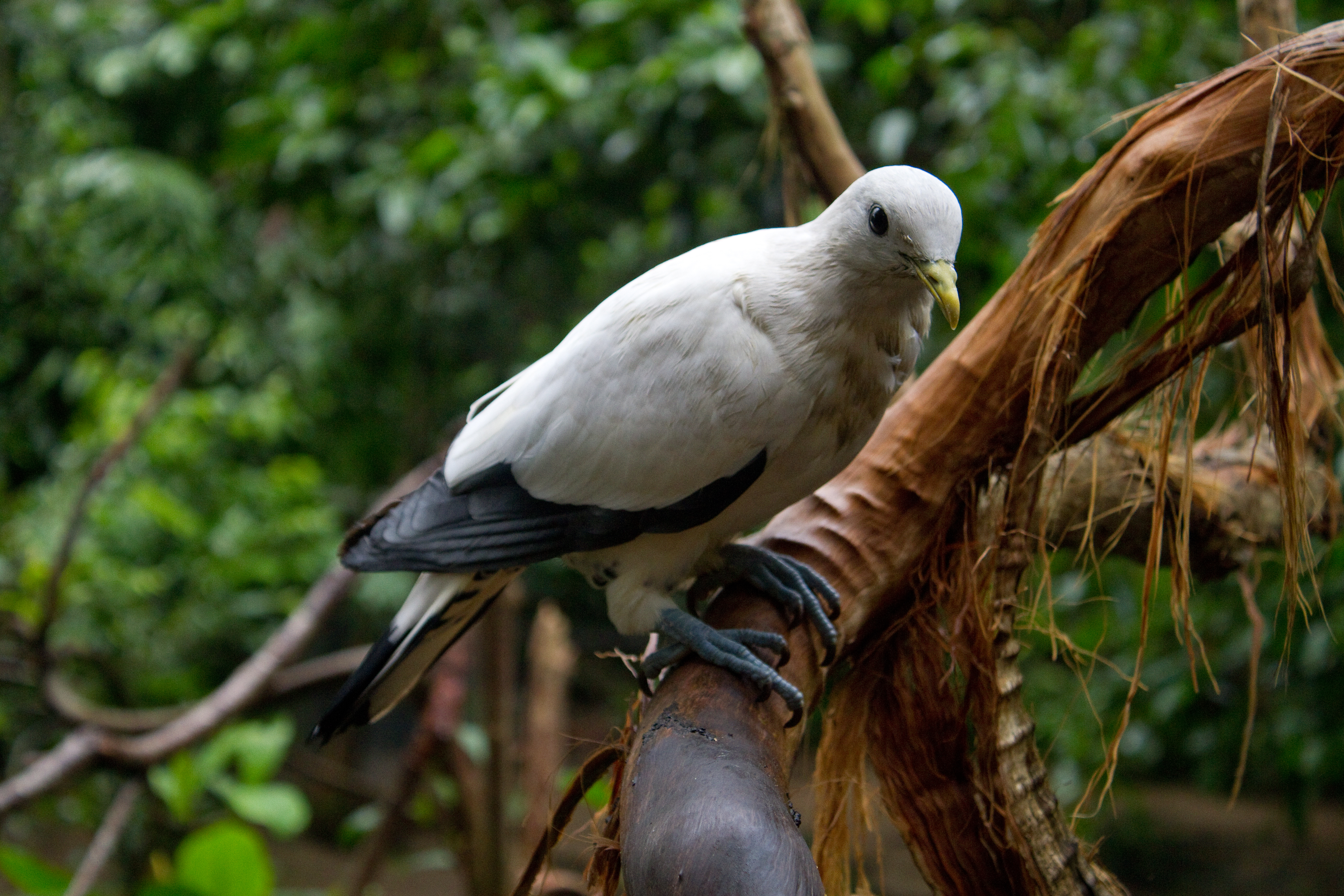
In Queensland, Australia

The birds were once present in large colonies in Cairns, Australia. Edmund Banfield wrote in 1908 that in Dunk Island "fully 100,000 come and go evening and morning", with flying colonies as wide as two miles. It was described by Harold Frith in 1982, who stated these processions as "one of the great ornithological experiences of the tropics." However, the birds were subject to mass slaughter in the 19th and early 20th Centuries because they were thought of as pests or easy targets for recreational shooting. Populations dropped rapidly before conservation activists such as Margaret and Arthur Thorsborne led a campaign to protect them and monitor their numbers.

Anecdotal evidence from Weipa, Cape York Peninsula in 1979 was that many birds migrating from Papua New Guinea were shot and pickled as provisions for the merchant shipping fleets moving through the Torres Strait. The population of birds visiting Weipa in the 1980s was so low that the birds distinctive call was heard but sightings at that time were rare. The population in Weipa today is thriving as flocks feed voraciously twice daily on Carpentaria Palms in suburban back yards from August each year.

The population is now slowly increasing because of their protected status in Australia, where there are now an estimated 500,000. The species remains locally fairly common in parts of its range, and is therefore considered to be of least concern by BirdLife International and IUCN.
