= Grey Peaks National Park =

National park in Australia

- IUCN category II (national park)
- Location within Queensland
- Location: Queensland
- Coordinates: 17°02′32″S 145°50′52″E
- Area: 9.2 km^{2} (3.6 sq mi)
- Established: 1971
- Governing body: Queensland Parks and Wildlife Service
- Website: Official website

Grey Peaks is a national park in Far North Queensland, Australia, 1,374 km northwest of Brisbane. It is part of the Coastal Wet Tropics Important Bird Area, identified as such by BirdLife International because of its importance for the conservation of lowland tropical rainforest birds.

The forests of the national park dominate are dominated by large-fruited red mahogany Eucalyptus pellita and red turpentine Syncarpia glomulifera.

The average altitude of the terrain is 88 metres.

== See also ==
- Protected areas of Queensland
