= Brook Islands National Park =

National park in Australia

- IUCN category II (national park)
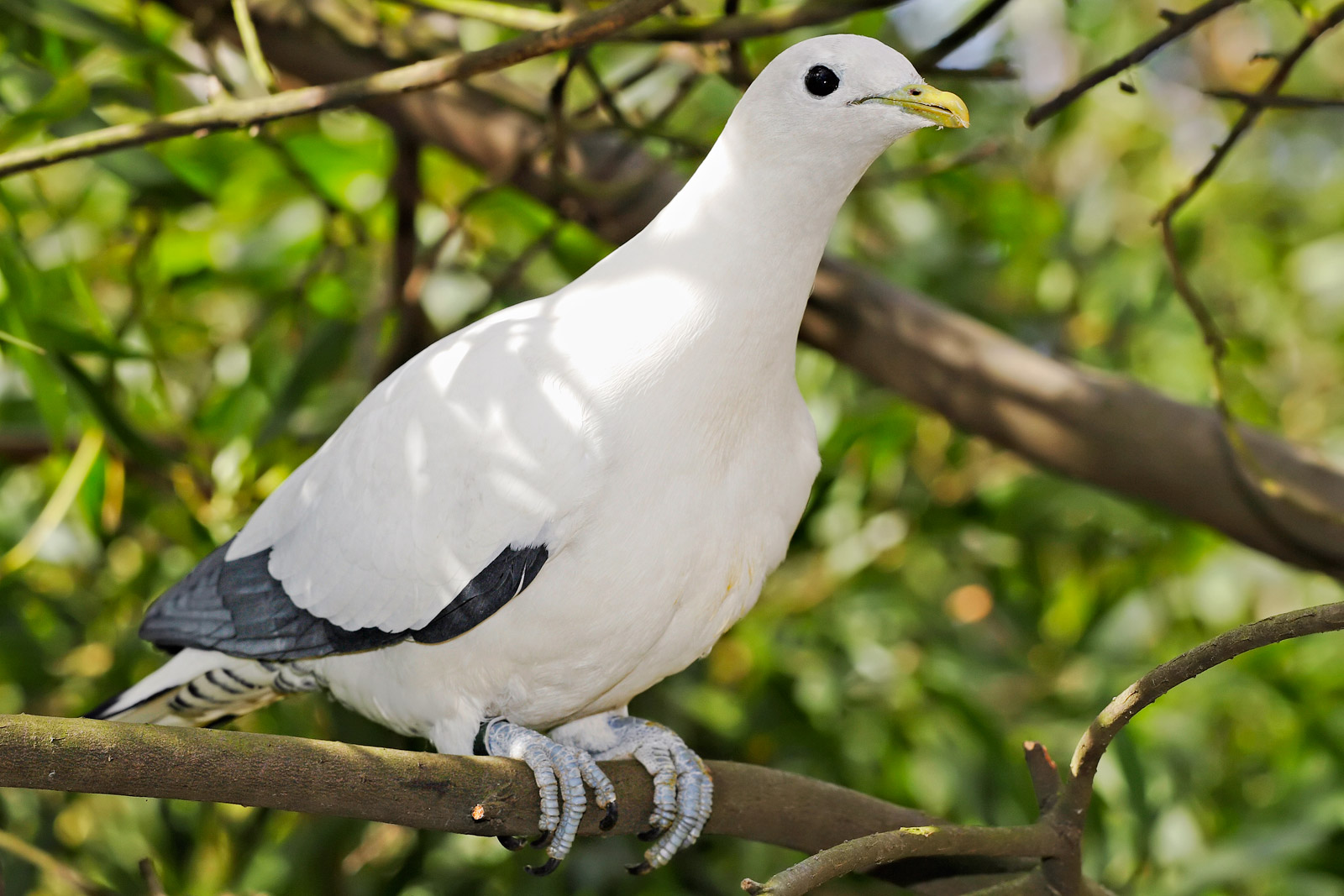
- Torresian imperial pigeon

- Location within Queensland
- Location: Queensland
- Coordinates: 18°8′29″S 146°16′56″E
- Area: 0.9 km^{2} (0.35 sq mi)
- Established: 1994
- Governing body: Queensland Parks and Wildlife Service

The Brook Islands National Park is a national park in Cassowary Coast Region, Queensland, Australia, 1246 km northwest of Brisbane, with an area of 0.9 km^{2}. It was established in 1994 and comprises three islands (North, Tween and Middle) which lie off the coast 7 km north-east of Cape Richards on Hinchinbrook Island and 30 km east of the nearest mainland town of Cardwell. The fourth island of the Brooks group, South Island, is not part of the national park but is protected by the Great Barrier Reef Marine Park Authority. Public access to the three islands in the national park is prohibited, to protect breeding birds, especially the Torresian imperial-pigeon. The islands have no roads, walking tracks or other facilities. Popular activities in the waters around the islands are boating, snorkelling and fishing. The islands are managed by the Queensland Parks and Wildlife Service. The Park's IUCN category is II.

== Fauna ==
Up to 60,000 pied imperial-pigeons breed on the islands during summer, providing a spectacle to onlookers as they return to their nests each evening after foraging for rainforest fruits in the mainland and Hinchinbrook Island. Following regular illegal shooting of the birds there during the early and mid 20th Century, the population using the islands was subject to a long protection campaign and monitoring program by conservation activists Margaret and Arthur Thorsborne. There are also breeding colonies of bridled, black-naped, little, lesser crested and roseate terns. Beach stone-curlews breed on North Island beaches. The islands have been classified by BirdLife International as an Important Bird Area because of the global importance of the site for pied imperial-pigeons and lesser crested terns.

== Flora ==
The plants of the Brook Islands are only partly known. North Brook Island's predominant vegetation is a lush, well-developed rainforest with many vines (notophyll vine forest), likely to include some rare and interesting species. Humans, feral animals, and weeds and fires have had less effect on the islands than on the mainland. This has ensured the islands remain as important representative samples of island ecosystems. North Brook's vine forests feature some very dense areas of the rare palm Arenga australasica. Although this palm is abundant on these small islands, it is rare on the mainland. Golden orchids Dendrobium discolor are abundant on the rocks near the shoreline. The vine forests are poorly known but appear not to have been subject to fire for a long time and are likely to prove botanically interesting when fully investigated. Many of the plants appear to indicate a relationship to the pied imperial-pigeons which regularly transport seed considerable distances and thus, it would appear, enrich the islands' species diversity. Common canopy species include Semecarpus australiensis (tar tree), Palaquium galactoxylum, Myristica insipida and Alstonia scholaris. The vegetation on the sandspit of North Brook Island is particularly well-developed compared with similar locations in the area.

== History ==
North Brook Island, the largest in the group, was in 1944 the venue for a series of British and American tests on the military uses of mustard gas. Pits were dug and Japanese-style dugouts were constructed to aid this testing. Virtually no trace of this remains. A documentary film relating to these and other tests, was released by Film Australia in 1989.

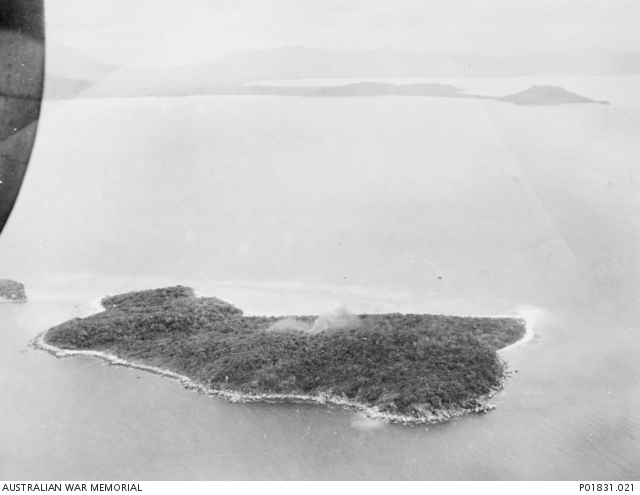
Aerial view of North Brook Island with smoke rising from a bomb test

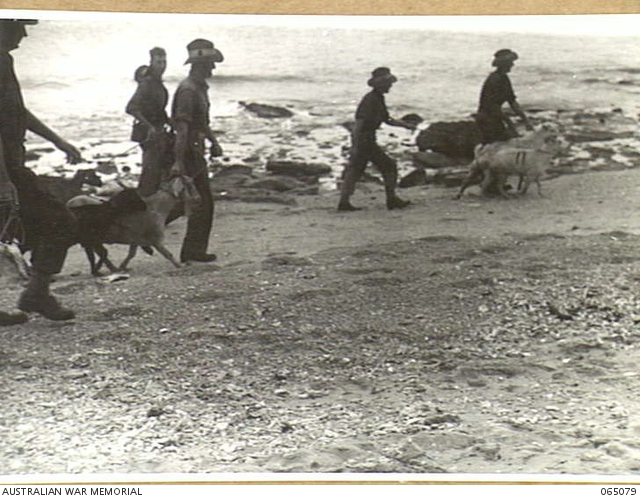
Australian Army staff bringing goats onto the island for mustard gas chemical weapon testing

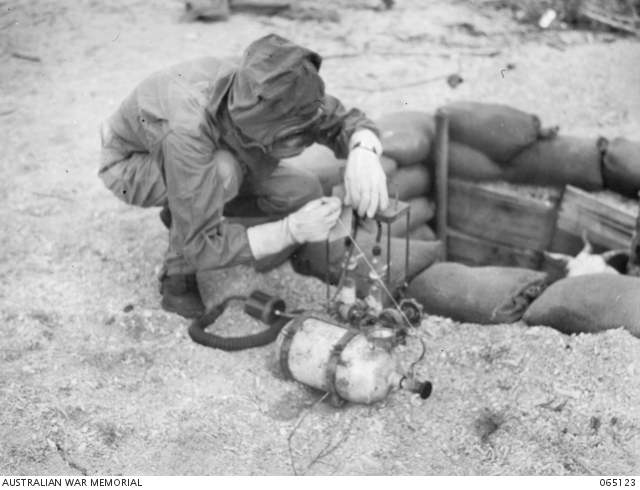
Australian Army staff preparing mustard gas with goat waiting in Japanese-style dugout

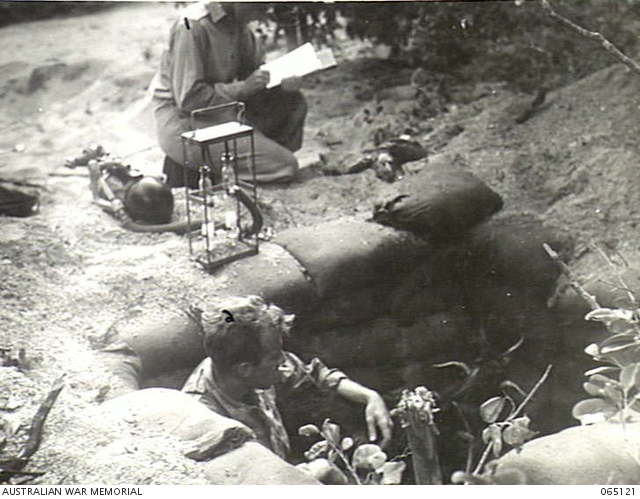
Army staff preparing for mustard gas test

== See also ==
- Keen as Mustard
- Protected areas of Queensland

== Attribution ==
This article incorporates text by the Queensland Government available under the CC BY 4.0 license.
