= Moresby Range National Park =

National park in Australia

- IUCN category II (national park)
- Location within Queensland
- Location: Queensland
- Nearest city: Innisfail
- Coordinates: 17.54667°S 146.08333°E
- Area: 2.79 km^{2} (1.08 sq mi)
- Established: 1973
- Governing body: Queensland Parks and Wildlife Service

Moresby Range is a national park in the Cassowary Coast Region in Far North Queensland, Australia, 1,314 kilometres (816 mi) northwest of Brisbane. It is part of the Coastal Wet Tropics Important Bird Area, identified as such by BirdLife International because of its importance for the conservation of lowland tropical rainforest birds.

The national park is located on the coast south of the mouth of the Johnstone River a few kilometres from Innisfail in the Cassowary Coast Region. The range reaches elevations of around 160 metres (520 ft) above sea level. It belongs to the Wet Tropics biogregion and lies within the Johnstone River water catchment. About 8% of the park is classed as wetlands.

The Spectacled flying fox is the only rare or threatened species to have been identified in the park. In 2010, five cassowaries which inhabit the park were tagged with GPS dataloggers with VHF transmitters to enable monitoring of their movement.

== See also ==
- Protected areas of Queensland
