= Clump Mountain National Park =

National park in Australia

- IUCN category II (national park)
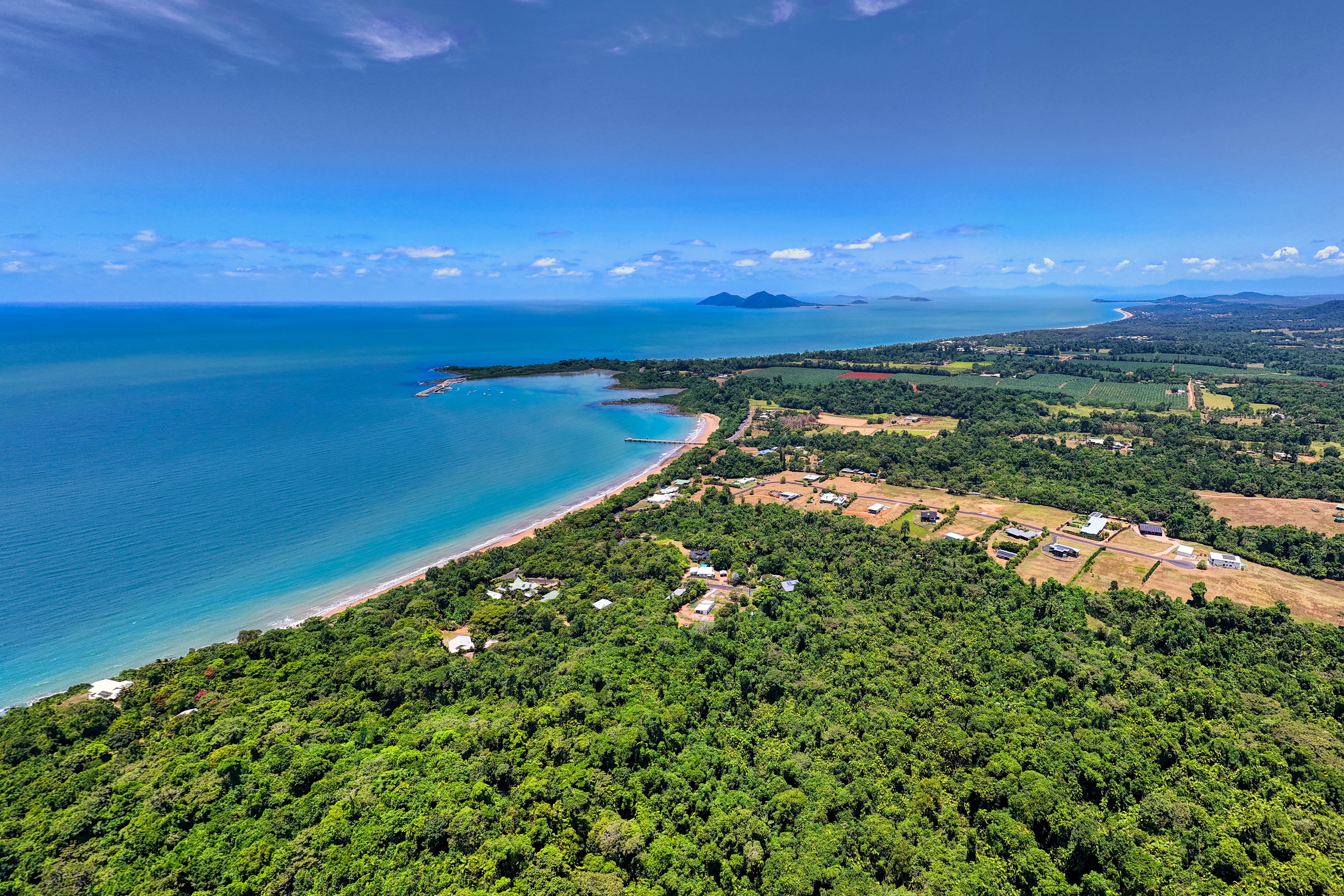
- View from Bicton Hill lookout, Clump Mountain National Park, October 2024

- Location within Queensland
- Location: Queensland
- Coordinates: 17°49′13″S 146°05′44″E
- Area: 2.82 km^{2} (1.09 sq mi)
- Established: 1963
- Governing body: Queensland Parks and Wildlife Service

Clump Mountain is a national park in Far North Queensland, Australia, 1,287 kilometres (800 mi) northwest of Brisbane. It is part of the Coastal Wet Tropics Important Bird Area, identified as such by BirdLife International because of its importance for the conservation of lowland tropical rainforest birds. Here is an important habitat of the endangered southern cassowary, a large flightless bird, which has been recorded only in the tropical rainforests of Queensland and New Guinea.

Estimated altitude is 240 metres.

== See also ==
- Protected areas of Queensland
