= Maria Creek National Park =

National park in Australia

- IUCN category II (national park)
- Location within Queensland
- Location: Queensland
- Coordinates: 17°46′50″S 146°6′7″E
- Area: 7.49 km^{2} (2.89 sq mi)
- Established: 1972
- Governing body: Queensland Parks and Wildlife Service

Maria Creek is a national park in Far North Queensland, Australia, 1292 km northwest of Brisbane. It is part of the Coastal Wet Tropics Important Bird Area, identified as such by BirdLife International because of its importance for the conservation of lowland tropical rainforest birds.

== See also ==
- Protected areas of Queensland
