= Girramay National Park =

National park in Queensland, Australia

- IUCN category II (national park)
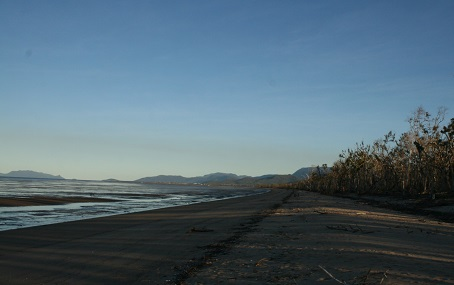

- Location within Queensland
- Location: Queensland
- Nearest city: Tully
- Coordinates: 18°02′41″S 146°01′41″E
- Area: 295 km^{2} (114 sq mi)
- Established: 2007
- Governing body: Queensland Parks and Wildlife Service
- Website: Official website

Girramay is a national park in Queensland, Australia, 1,269 km northwest of Brisbane. The national park is part of the Wet Tropics World Heritage Area.

The park protects part of the coastline between the mouths of the Tully River and Meunga Creek at Rockingham Bay. Waters adjacent to the park belong to the Great Barrier Reef Marine Park.

== Flora ==
The coastal plain contains mangrove and freshwater swamps associated with the waterways of Murray River, Dallachy Creek and Wreck Creek. Other vegetation types include low coastal rainforest, eucalyptus forest, melaleuca woodland and sedge swamp. The Arenga palm grows here, one of only a few Australian mainland locations where this occurs. The Red Beech, pandanus and melaleucas are typically found in the park.

== Fauna ==
The endangered southern cassowary and mahogany glider are found in the park. Saltwater crocodiles are found in the creeks. The park is part of the Coastal Wet Tropics Important Bird Area, identified as such by BirdLife International because of its importance for the conservation of lowland tropical rainforest birds. Common birds include the black butcherbird and various honeyeaters. The orange-footed scrubfowl nests in the park. Their mounds, which can be up to three m high, are the largest of all mound-building birds in Australia. Lace monitor lizards can also be seen in Girramay National Park.

Feral pigs and cattle have to be culled from the area.

== History ==
The land was once home to the Girramay people. In 1848, explorer Edmund Kennedy and his party landed 35 km north of the park. He travelled south through the area now known as Girramay National Park in a failed attempt to find passage over the ranges behind the coast.

The Edmund Kennedy National Park was established in 1977. It was expanded in 1980 by land donated by conservation activists Margaret and Arthur Thorsborne.

In 2009, Edmund Kennedy National Park was, along with the Murray Upper National Park, subsumed into the Girramay National Park.

In 2011, Cyclone Yasi caused significant damage to the area.

== Facilities ==
Camping is not permitted in the park. Picnic facilities including tables and toilets are available. A boardwalk through mangroves and another along Wreck Creek are graded as easy.

== Access ==
The park can be reached by an entrance road four km north of Cardwell on the Bruce Highway.

== See also ==
- Protected areas of Queensland
