= Palmerston Rocks National Park =

National park in Australia

- IUCN category II (national park)
- Location within Queensland
- Location: Queensland
- Coordinates: 17°34′12″S 145°53′53″E
- Area: 0.10 km^{2} (0.039 sq mi)
- Governing body: Queensland Parks and Wildlife Service

Palmerston Rocks is a national park in Queensland, Australia, 1,321 km northwest of Brisbane.

== See also ==
- Protected areas of Queensland
