= Kurrimine Beach National Park =

National park in Queensland, Australia

- IUCN category II (national park)
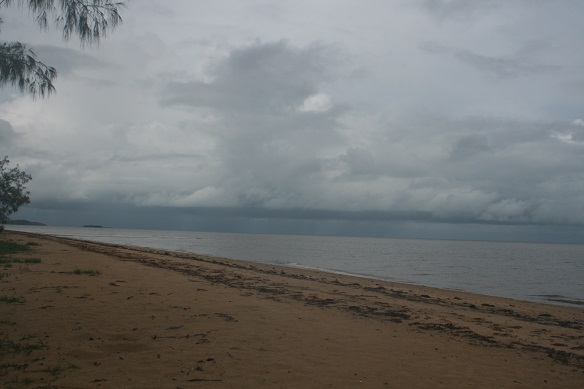

- Location within Queensland
- Location: Queensland
- Nearest city: Innisfail
- Coordinates: 17°43′56″S 146°5′44″E
- Area: 9.10 km^{2} (3.51 sq mi)
- Established: 1977
- Governing body: Queensland Parks and Wildlife Service
- Website: Official website

Kurrimine Beach is a national park in Queensland, Australia, which lies 1,295 km northwest of Brisbane. It is part of the Coastal Wet Tropics Important Bird Area, identified as such by BirdLife International because of its importance for the conservation of lowland tropical rainforest birds.

== See also ==
- Protected areas of Queensland
