= Topaz Road National Park =

National park in Queensland, Australia

- IUCN category II (national park)
- Location within Queensland
- Location: Queensland
- Coordinates: 17°24′0″S 145°41′59″E
- Area: 0.4 km^{2} (0.15 sq mi)
- Established: 1977
- Governing body: Queensland Parks and Wildlife Service

Topaz Road is a national park in Far North Queensland, Australia, 1,348 km northwest of Brisbane. It covers an area of 0.4 km^{2}. According to the Queensland Government, "Topaz Road National Park protects remnant rainforest in the upper Johnstone River catchment. The park and nearby nature refuges form a network of protected areas that adjoin Wooroonooran National Park, providing habitat connectivity for a wide variety of Wet Tropics species."

== See also ==
- Protected areas of Queensland
