= Cowley =

Cowley may refer to:

== Places ==
=== Australia ===
- Cowley County, New South Wales
- Cowley, Queensland, a rural locality in the Cassowary Coast Region
- Cowley Beach, Queensland
- Cowley Creek, Queensland
- Lower Cowley, Queensland

=== Canada ===
- Cowley, Alberta

=== England ===
- Cowley, Derbyshire
- Cowley, Devon
- Cowley, Gloucestershire
- Cowley, London
- Cowley, Oxfordshire
- Cowley Road, Oxford

=== United States ===
- Cowley, Texas
- Cowley, Wyoming
- Cowley County, Kansas

== People ==
- Cowley (surname), English-language surname
- Cowley Wright (1889–1923), English actor

== Other uses ==
- Cowley Airport, near Cowley, Alberta, Canada
- Cowley Community College, Arkansas City, Kansas
- Earl Cowley, a British title

== See also ==
- Cowley High School (disambiguation)
- Crowley (disambiguation)
