= No. 5 Branch, Queensland =

No. 5 Branch
- Suburb
- Interactive map of No. 5 Branch
- Coordinates: 17.7261°S 146.0091°E
- Country: Australia
- State: Queensland
- LGA: Cassowary Coast Region
- Location: 31.4 km (19.5 mi) NNW of Tully; 34.0 km (21.1 mi) S of Innisfail; 122 km (76 mi) S of Cairns; 1,573 km (977 mi) NNW of Brisbane

Government
  - State electorate: Hill
  - Federal division: Kennedy

Area
  - Total: 4.4 km^{2} (1.7 sq mi)
- Elevation: 10–90 m (33–295 ft)

Population
  - Total: 0 (2021 census)
  - Density: 0.00/km^{2} (0.00/sq mi)
- Time zone: UTC+10:00 (AEST)
- Postcode: 4856
Suburbs around No. 5 Branch
Basilisk	Warrubullen	Cowley Creek
Walter Lever Estate	No. 5 Branch	Goolboo
Silkwood	Silkwood	Silkwood

No. 5 Branch is a rural locality in the Cassowary Coast Region, Queensland, Australia. In the 2021 census, No. 5 Branch had "no people or a very low population".

== Geography ==
The locality is bounded to the south and east by Liverpool Creek (which ultimately flows into the Coral Sea at Cowley Beach / Kurramine Beach).

Most of the locality is relative flat and low-lying, 10 to 20 metres (33 to 66 ft) above sea level, but the north-west of the locality is on the lower slopes of the Basilisk Range and rises to 90 metres (300 ft).

The land use in the south and east of the locality is growing sugarcane and bananas. The land use in the north-western part of the locality is grazing on native vegetation.

== Demographics ==
In the 2016 census, the population of the locality was 9 people.

In the 2021 census, No. 5 Branch had "no people or a very low population".

== Education ==
There are no schools in the locality. The nearest government primary school is Silkwood State School in neighbouring Silkwood to the south. The nearest government secondary schools are Tully State High School in Tully to the south and Innsifail State College in Innisfail Estate in Innisfail to the north.
