= Battista Mombrini =

Italian painter and sculptor (born 1944)

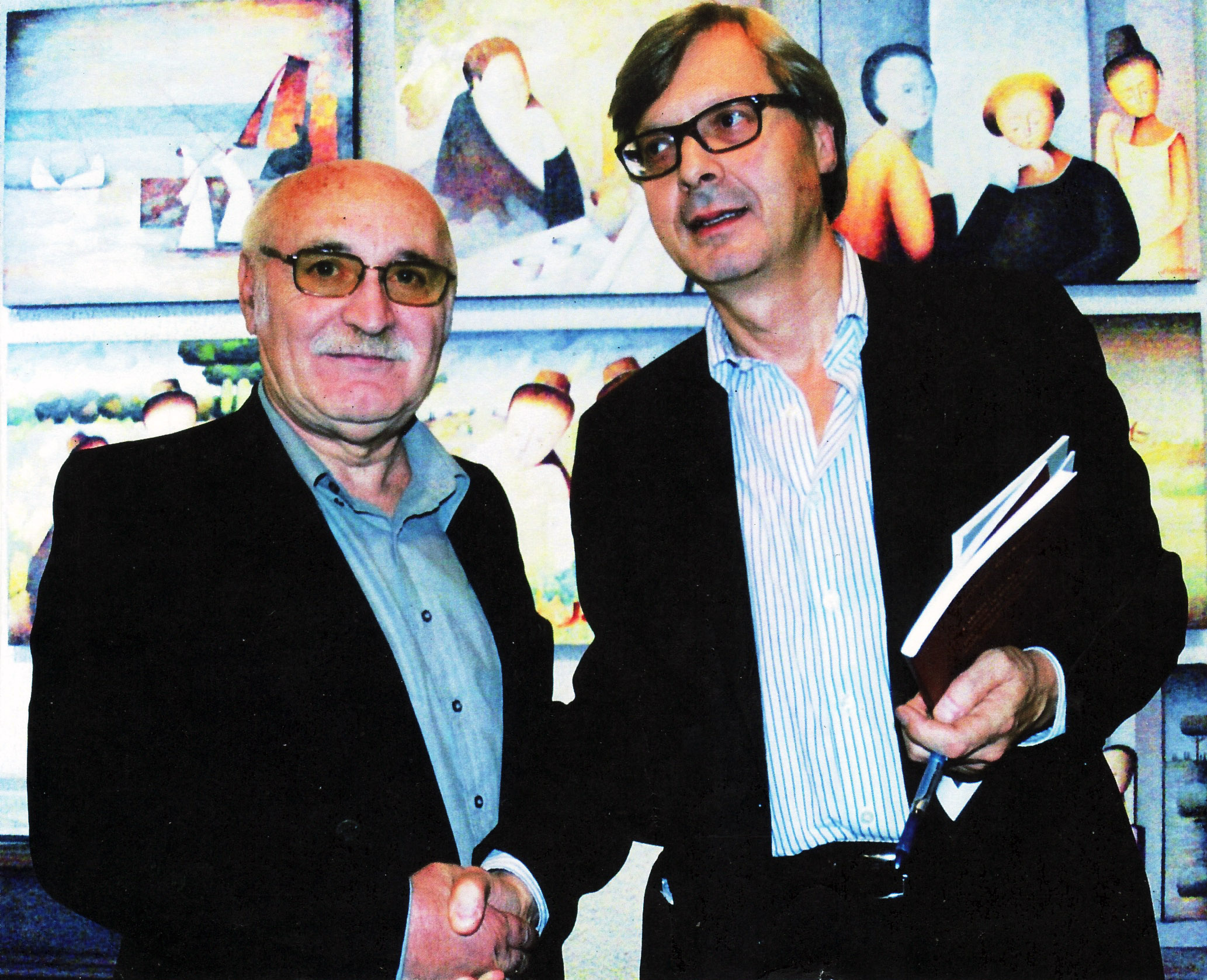
- Battista Mombrini e Vittorio Sgarbi
- Born: 10 January 1944; Treviglio, Italy
- Known for: Painting, Sculpture

Battista Mombrini (born 10 January 1944 in Treviglio) is an Italian painter and sculptor.

== Biography ==
Son of Mario and Agnes Mombrini, after eleven years of middle and grammar school at the college of San Pietro Seveso, Mombrini devoted himself entirely to painting by attending the artistic environment of Milan, the Brera Academy, and various museums, galleries and exhibition of Milan, drawing inspiration from artists of the period (especially the teachers Aldo Fornoni, best known for his female nudes and crayon, and Paul Frosecchi). With the brothers Filippo and Giuseppe Villa, he was among the founders of the Group Brera Academy in Milan which brings together young artists.

Mombrini opened his own studio in Treviglio via Sangalli, which is still active, its artistic production (started in 1964) focuses initially on the topics "training" of portraiture, nude and landscape and then moved progressively towards the end of the seventies, to a decidedly personal interpretation and processing of breakdowns in key neo-cubist figurative. In 1976 he presented this evolution of his painting in a group show dedicated to the Italian countryside with Caroline Yeats Brown in London (August to Beauchamps Gallery in Chelsea and in September at the John Sears Gallery in Piccadilly Circus); in 1977 in France, at the Galerie d 'orsel of Paris, and in November 1978 in Switzerland, at the Maison des arts in La Chaux-de-Fonds, with personal tribute to the emigrant in which sociological approaches to those issues which characterize the creations later. In 1986 he exhibited at the Galerie Boycott in Brussels, Belgium.

The eighties were marked by intense organizational activity in Treviglio, when he took part in the founding of the association Pro Loco Shop Center, but especially in 1978 to the design of the exhibition "Painters of Via Sangalli" which, gathering every year hundreds of artists in a folk festival as well as cultural, was briefly known as "the little Bagutta Treviglio". on September 21, 2013 after 25 years since the last time he wanted to recreate that with 92 artists who exhibited their works.

Moment in his "maturity" Art is the historical exhibition in 1997 in Monte Carlo, in the principality of Monaco, at the Maison de l'Amérique Latine.

Just for the undoubted technical ability and the intense appeal to values and feelings ( whether now with romantic, mystical time ) contained in his works, he was commissioned to decorate a wall of the Memorial Irmã Dulce (Sister Dulce, a Brazilian nun known for her dedication to the poor of her country ) to celebrate the sixth anniversary of the disappearance and the start of the process of beatification. The fresco, of 60 square meters, was inaugurated March 12, 1998 in the church dedicated to St. Anthony of Padua in Salvador de Bahia, where Mombrini back a few months later for a short exposure ( 17 to 21 August ) of twenty of his works at the Solar do Unhão, the Museum of Modern Art in El Salvador, and again in August 1999 to build a second fresco, a Maternity hospital in the entrance hall from Children's Day ( Children's Hospital ) in Memorial Irmã Dulce. In March 2003, he was back in Brazil, but this time in caraa, common in the extreme south of the country with a majority Italian population (Treviglio in particular), together with the artist to decorate the apse Brazilian Ho Monteiro ( 80 square meters) of restored sanctuary of Nossa Senhora das Lagrimas, the patron saint of both the Brazilian city of Treviglio.

During these years he exhibited also abroad, as in Beijing in 2006, in Greece in 2007, in Moscow in 2008 at the GUM on Red Square. In that same year returns for the last time in Brazil and Salvador de Bahia to affrescarvi the apse of the sanctuary of the Blessed Dulce of the Poor, also known as Church of the Immaculate Conception.

In 2010 he took part in the Prize of Contemporary Art Archer - Island of S. Antioco and the Spoleto Prize 53 - Festival of the Two Worlds, both curated by art critic Vittorio Sgarbi, who, in November, it also presents the staff at the number of Treviglio and, in 2011, selected for the Italian Pavilion (Lombardy region) of the 54th Venice Biennale, served from June to November at the Palazzo Te in Mantua.

In January 2013 he exhibited at the gallery Adagio of the French town of Thionville, near the border with Luxembourg, the warm welcome and success found here, prompted the organizers to plan within the year the construction of a new exhibition in the neighboring state.

On April 27, 2013 took part in the seventh edition of the Festival International Artistic Martesana at the Villa Castelbarco in Vaprio d'Adda

On November 12, 2013 is included in the list of participants at the 1st Biennial of Creativity, which was held at the Palexpo Exhibition in Verona 12 to 16 January 2014. The Biennale was inaugurated by Vittorio Sgarbi. At the award ceremony on 16 January stepped in as guest of honor Katia Ricciarelli.

In 2014, celebrating 50 years in business.

== Exhibition ==
Personal

- 1969 - Gallery Diamante - Milan (Italy)
- 1971 - Bergamo (Italy)
- 1971 - Milan (Italy)
- 1972 - Milan (Italy)
- 1973 - Mandello del Lario - Lecco (Italy)
- 1974 - Vicenza (Italy)
- 1974 - Picchiaie - Elba (Italy)
- 1975 - Gallery Artioli - Treviglio (Italy)
- 1976 - Gallery Courier - Pesaro (Italy)
- 1976 - Gallery Beauchamps e John Sears Gallery - London (England)
- 1976 - Maison des Arts - Paris (France)
- 1977 - Library room - Ciserano (Italy)
- 1977 - La Chaux-de-Fonds - Switzerland
- 1978 - Gallery - Pegognaga (Italy)
- 1978 - Gallery - Caravaggio (Italy)
- 1979 - Gallery - Treviglio (Italy)
- 1979 - Cassa Rurale ed Artigiana - Treviglio (Italy)
- 1980 - Ars Gallery - Bergamo (Italy)
- 1980 - Cassa Rurale ed Artigiana - Treviglio (Italy)
- 1981 - Showroom - Fara Gera d'Adda (Italy)
- 1984 - Gallery - Treviglio (Italy)
- 1985 - Gallery - Florence (Italy)
- 1986 - Showroom - Mantua (Italy)
- 1986 - Galeria Boycott - Brussels (Belgium)
- 1987 - art biennial - Bari (Italy)
- 1987 - Library room - Cassano d'Adda (Italy)
- 1989 - Castello Visconteo - Trezzo sull'Adda (Italy)
- 1990 - Pro Loco - Cassano d'Adda (Italy)
- 1992 - Ancient convent of Concesa - Trezzo sull'Adda (Italy)
- 1992 - Castle Trezzo - Trezzo sull'Adda (Italy)
- 1993 - Gallery - Inzago (Italy)
- 1995 - Centre Georges Pompidou - Paris (France)
- 1995 - Library room - Cassano d'Adda (Italy)
- 1996 - Villa Castelbarco - Vaprio d'Adda (Italy)
- 1996 - Villa Gina - Concesa, (Trezzo sull'Adda) (Italy)
- 1997 - Maison de l'Amérique Latine de Monaco - Principality of Monaco
- 1998 - Museo Solar do Unhão - Salvador (Bahia) (Brazil)
- 1998 - Obras Sociais Irmã Dulce - Salvador (Bahia) (Brazil)
- 1999 - Obras Sociais Irmã Dulce - Salvador (Bahia) (Brazil)
- 1999 - Gallery Sallambo - Paris (France)
- 2001 - Pro Loco - Cassano d'Adda (Italy)
- 2002 - Showroom - Treviglio (Italy)
- 2003 - Santuário de Nossa Senhora das Lágrimas - Caraá (Brazil)
- 2005 - Auditorium - Ciserano (Italy)
- 2006 - Building Berva - Cassano d'Adda (Italy)
- 2007 - Greece
- 2008 - Santuário da Bem-aventurada Dulce dos Pobres - Salvador (Bahia) (Brazil)
- 2008 - Moscow (Russia)
- 2010 - Museum of Treviglio (Italy)
- 2013 - Thionville (France)

Collective

- 1964 - show young artists - Treviglio (Italy)
- 1968 - shows young European artists - Rome (Italy)
- 1969 - Group Brera - Cavalo Branco - Treviglio (Italy)
- 1969 - Lombard Artists - Rome (Italy)
- 1969 - Italian artists today - Rome (Italy)
- 1970 - Group Brera - Hotel Milão - Brunate (Italy)
- 1970 - Group Brera - Bergamo (Italy)
- 1974 - 4x4 Gallery Diamante - Milan (Italy)
- 1975 - International Art Centre - Milan (Italy)
- 1976 - Gallery - Caravaggio (Italy)
- 1977 - Lombard artistic center of Lazio - Treviglio (Italy)
- 1977 - Spring'77 - UNESCO - Paris (France)
- 1979 - The Antena - Bergamo (Italy)
- 1988 - Adro (Italy)
- 1988 - 100 artists and a poem - Milan (Italy)
- 1989 - The woman in the painting - Milan (Italy)
- 1990 - UNESCO - Paris (France)
- 1991 - Europe tomorrow - Geneva (Switzerland)
- 1992 - Motherhood in art - Cassano d'Adda (Italy)
- 1994 - Art for Telethon - Treviglio (Italy)
- 2006 - Expo - Beijing (China)
- 2010 - Archer Award - Island of S. Antioco (Italy)
- 2010 - Festival dei Due Mondi - Spoleto (Italy)
- 2011 - Biennale - Palazzo del Te - Mantua (Italy)
- 2013 - VII international art exhibition martesana - Villa Castelbarco - Vaprio d'Adda (Italy)
- 2014 - First Italian Biennale of Creativity - Verona (Italy)

== Bibliography ==
- Battista Mombrini - Logos (catalog of the exhibition held at the Visconti Castle of Trezzo, 11 to 25 October 1992), Trezzo sull'Adda, 1992.
- Alessandra Jerse and Piero Confalonieri (ed.), Mombrini - Lights of the sun and colors of sounds (catalog of the exhibition held at the Maison de l'Amérique Latine de Monaco, Monte Carlo, August 27 - September 6, 1997 ), Trezzo sull'Adda, Bama, 1977.
- Mombrini. Suspended time (review of the exhibition held in Treviglio, 12 May-2 June 2002), Treviglio, Municipality, 2002.
- Vittorio Sgarbi (ed.), "Mombrini", Vaprio d'Adda, Sep Bama, 2010.
