= Warrubullen, Queensland =

Warrubullen
- Suburb
- Interactive map of Warrubullen
- Coordinates: 17.6808°S 146.0130°E
- Country: Australia
- State: Queensland
- LGA: Cassowary Coast Region
- Location: 26.7 km (16.6 mi) S of Innisfail; 115 km (71 mi) SSE of Cairns; 239 km (149 mi) NNW of Townsville; 1,589 km (987 mi) NNW of Brisbane

Government
  - State electorate: Hill
  - Federal division: Kennedy

Area
  - Total: 16.2 km^{2} (6.3 sq mi)

Population
  - Total: 59 (2021 census)
  - Density: 3.64/km^{2} (9.43/sq mi)
- Time zone: UTC+10:00 (AEST)
- Postcode: 4871
Suburbs around Warrubullen
Basilisk	Moresby	Sandy Pocket
Basilisk	Warrubullen	Cowley; Cowley Creek
Basilisk	No 5 Branch	Goolboo

Warrubullen is a rural locality in the Cassowary Coast Region, Queensland, Australia. In the 2021 census, Warrubullen had a population of 59 people.

== Geography ==
The locality is bounded to the west by the Basilisk Range National Park.

The North Coast railway line enters the locality from the south-east (Goolboo) and exits to the north (Moresby). The locality was once served by the now-abandoned Warrubullen railway station (17.7080°S 146.0163°E).

The Warrubullen Conservation Park is in the north of the locality. Apart from the protected area, the land use is predominantly grazing on native vegetation with some sugarcane growing in the south of the locality.

== Demographics ==
In the 2016 census, Warrubullen had a population of 61 people.

In the 2021 census, Warrubullen had a population of 59 people.

== Education ==
There are no schools in Warrubullen. The nearest government primary schools are Mourilyan State School in Mourilyan to the north and Silkwood State School in Silkwood to the south. The nearest government secondary school is Innisfail State College in Innisfail Estate, Innisfail.
