= Crowley =

Crowley may refer to:

== Places ==
- Crowley, Mendocino County, California, an unincorporated community
- Crowley County, Colorado
- Crowley, Colorado, a town in Crowley County
- Crowley, Louisiana, a city
- Crowley, Oregon (disambiguation)
- Crowley, Texas, a city
- Crowley Lake, a reservoir in Mono County, California

== Corporations ==
- Crowley Foods, an American dairy company
- Crowley Maritime, an American diversified transportation and logistics company
- Crowley's, or Crowley Milner and Company, an American department store chain

== Other uses ==
- Crowley (surname)
  - Aleister Crowley, English occultist, ceremonial magician, poet, painter, novelist
- Crowley (Supernatural), a character in American TV series Supernatural
- "Mr. Crowley", a song by Ozzy Osbourne, named in reference to Aleister Crowley
- USS Crowley, a US Navy destroyer escort which served in World War II
- Crowley, the US title of 2008 British horror film Chemical Wedding
- Crowley, a character in Good Omens, a novel by Neil Gaiman and Terry Pratchett

== See also ==
- Cowley (disambiguation)
