= Acacia legnota =

Heath wattle

Scientific classification
- Kingdom: Plantae
- Clade: Embryophytes
- Clade: Tracheophytes
- Clade: Spermatophytes
- Clade: Angiosperms
- Clade: Eudicots
- Clade: Rosids
- Order: Fabales
- Family: Fabaceae
- Subfamily: Caesalpinioideae
- Clade: Mimosoid clade
- Genus: Acacia
- Species: A. legnota

Binomial name
- Acacia legnota Pedley
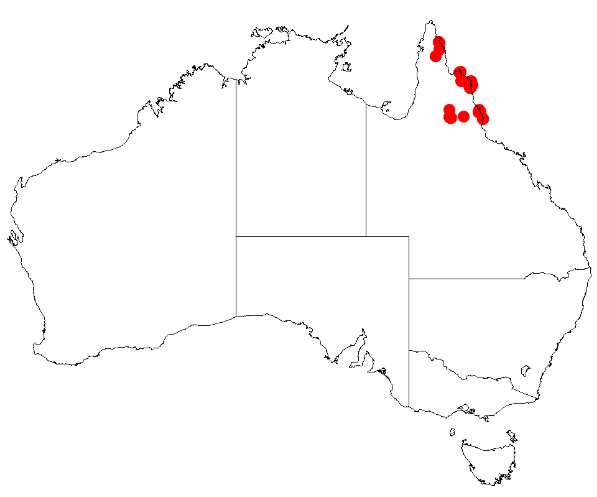
- Occurrence data from AVH

Synonyms
- Racosperma legnotum (Pedley) Pedley

Species of legume

Acacia legnota is a species of flowering plant in the family Fabaceae and is endemic to the north of Queensland, Australia. It is a shrub to tree with smooth grey bark, narrowly elliptic to lance-shaped, strongly sickle-shaped, glabrous phyllodes, spherical heads of golden yellow flowers and linear, leathery pods rounded over the seeds.

== Description ==
Acacia legnota is a shrub to tree that typically grows to a height of 2–4 m (6 ft 7 in – 13 ft 1 in) and has smooth, grey bark and glabrous branchlets. Its phyllodes are narrowly elliptic to lance-shaped with the narrower end towards the base, strongly sickle-shaped, 120–180 mm (4.7–7.1 in) long, 8–19 mm (0.31–0.75 in) wide, thinly leathery and glabrous with six to eight main veins and minor veins in between. The flowers are borne in two to four spherical heads in racemes 2–7 mm (0.079–0.276 in) long on glabrous peduncles 10–25 mm (0.39–0.98 in) long, each head 5–6 mm (0.20–0.24 in) in diameter with about 35 golden yellow flowers. Flowering has been observed in June, and the pods are linear, straight, up to 120 mm (4.7 in) long, 9–11 mm (0.35–0.43 in) wide, leathery, glabrous with prominent margins and rounded over the seeds. The seeds are broadly elliptic, about 5 mm (0.20 in) long, dull dark brown with a club-shaped aril.

== Taxonomy ==
Acacia legnota was first formally described in 1978 by the Leslie Pedley in the journal Austrobaileya from specimens collected on the north shore of the Endeavour River at Cooktown in 1968.

== Distribution and habitat ==
This species of wattle is common between Cape Flattery and Cookton in coastal areas with outlying populations in the Iron Range area and at Cowley Beach, where it grows in coastal sand dunes and in shrubby heathland, often long streams or near lagoons.

== Conservation status ==
Acacia legnota is listed as 'least concern', under the Queensland Government Nature Conservation Act 1992.

== See also ==
- List of Acacia species
