= McCutcheon, Queensland =

McCutcheon
- Suburb
- Interactive map of McCutcheon
- Coordinates: 17.7230°S 146.0555°E
- Country: Australia
- State: Queensland
- LGA: Cassowary Coast Region
- Location: 26.1 km (16.2 mi) S of Innisfail; 29.6 km (18.4 mi) NNE of Tully; 113 km (70 mi) S of Cairns; 237 km (147 mi) NNW of Townsville; 1,587 km (986 mi) NNW of Brisbane

Government
  - State electorate: Hill
  - Federal division: Kennedy

Area
  - Total: 13.4 km^{2} (5.2 sq mi)

Population
  - Total: 34 (2021 census)
  - Density: 2.54/km^{2} (6.57/sq mi)
- Time zone: UTC+10:00 (AEST)
- Postcode: 4856
Suburbs around McCutcheon
Cowley	Lower Cowley	Lower Cowley
Goolboo	McCutcheon	Kurrimine Beach
Silkwood	Silkwood	Kurrimine Beach

McCutcheon is a rural locality in the Cassowary Coast Region, Queensland, Australia. In the 2021 census, McCutcheon had a population of 34 people.

== Geography ==
Liverpool Creek forms the northern boundary of the locality. Stephensons Road forms part of the eastern boundary of the locality, while Spanos Road forms part of the south-western boundary. The Bruce Highway crosses Liverpool Creek at the north-western corner of the locality but does not enter the locality.

The main land use is crop growing (predominantly sugarcane) with some grazing on native vegetation. There are cane tramways to transport the harvested sugarcane to the local sugar mill.

== Demographics ==
In the 2016 census, McCutcheon had a population of 29 people.

In the 2021 census, McCutcheon had a population of 34 people.

== Education ==
There are no schools in McCutcheon. The nearest government primary school is Silkwood State School in neighbouring Silkwood to the south-west. The nearest government secondary schools are Innisfail State College in Innisfail Estate to the north and Tully State High School in Tully to the south-west.

There is a Catholic primary school in neighbouring Silkwood and a Catholic secondary school in Innisfail.
