= Walter Lever Estate =

- Suburb
- Interactive map of Walter Lever Estate
- Coordinates: 17.7238°S 145.9769°E
- Country: Australia
- State: Queensland
- LGA: Cassowary Coast Region
- Location: 6.5 km (4.0 mi) W of Silkwood; 32.6 km (20.3 mi) N of Tully; 35.3 km (21.9 mi) SSW of Innisfail; 123 km (76 mi) SSE of Cairns; 1,590 km (990 mi) NNW of Brisbane

Government
  - State electorate: Hill
  - Federal division: Kennedy

Area
  - Total: 12.9 km^{2} (5.0 sq mi)

Population
  - Total: 44 (2021 census)
  - Density: 3.41/km^{2} (8.83/sq mi)
- Time zone: UTC+10:00 (AEST)
- Postcode: 4856
Suburbs around Walter Lever Estate
Basilisk	Basilisk	Basilisk
Basilisk	Walter Lever Estate	No 5 Branch
Japoonvale	No 4 Branch	Silkwood

Walter Lever Estate is a rural locality in the Cassowary Coast Region, Queensland, Australia. In the 2021 census, Walter Lever Estate had a population of 44 people.

== Geography ==
Liverpool Creek forms the southern boundary of the locality. The name might refer to the sailing ship Liverpool, which took part in the discovery of the wreck of the schooner Riser in August 1878, on King Reefs.

Mount Warrubullen is on the northern boundary of the locality with Basilisk (17.7017°S 145.9827°E), rising to 394 metres (1,293 ft) above sea level.

Walter Lever Estate Road enters the locality from the south-west (Japoonvale) and exits to the east (No 5 Branch).

The land use is predominantly crop growing (mostly sugarcane) with some grazing on native vegetation. There is a network of cane tramways to transport the harvested sugarcane to the South Johnstone sugar mill.

== History ==
The locality takes its name from the real estate subdivision in 1914. Called the Walter Lever Estate, it consisted of 640 acres (260 ha) of dense tropical jungle divided into individual farm lots of 45 to 116 acres (18 to 47 ha). Walter Lever was an early landholder in the Liverpool Creek area.

Local lobbying for a school began in 1932. Lever Estate State School opened on 2 November 1936. It closed on 15 March 1964. It reopened circa January 1965 and then closed finally on 26 May 1967. It was at 410 Walter Lever Estate Road (17.73028°N 145.97258°E).

== Demographics ==
In the 2016 census, Walter Lever Estate had a population of 49 people.

In the 2021 census, Walter Lever Estate had a population of 44 people.

== Education ==
There are no schools in Walter Lever Estate. The nearest government primary school is Silkwood State School in neighbouring Silkwood to the south-east. The nearest government secondary school is Tully State High School in Tully to the south. There are also Catholic primary schools in Silkwood and Tully.
