= Cowley, Queensland =

Cowley
- Suburb
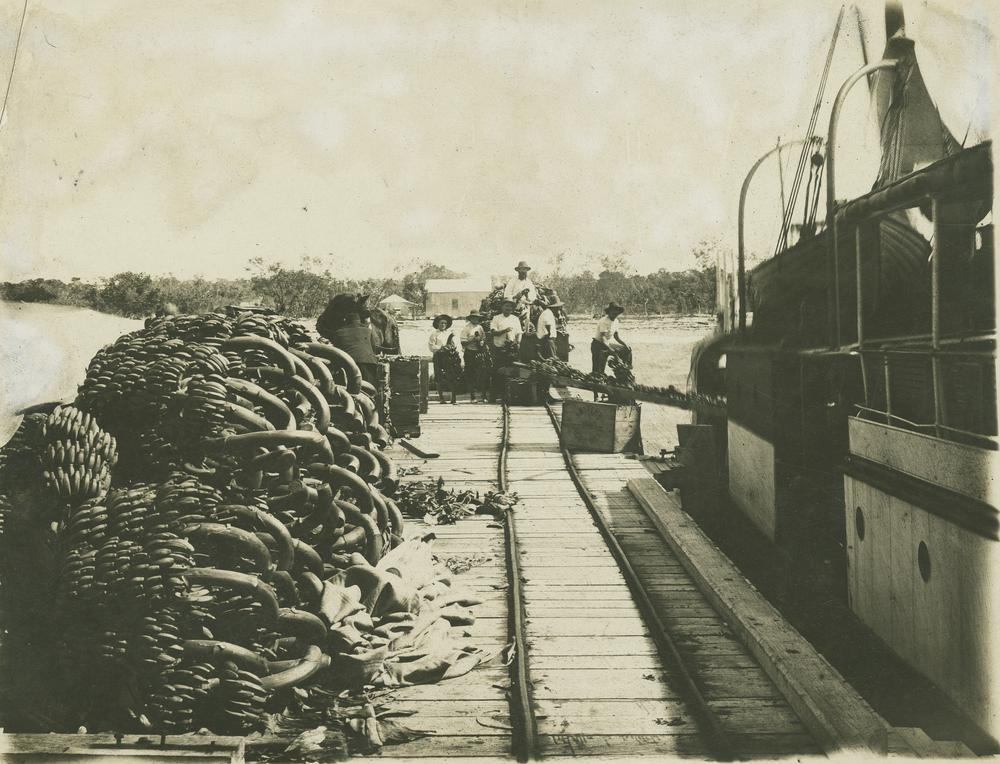
- Bananas ready for loading on the Cowley Jetty, circa 1920

- Interactive map of Cowley
- Coordinates: 17.6830°S 146.0536°E
- Country: Australia
- State: Queensland
- LGA: Cassowary Coast Region
- Location: 9.2 km (5.7 mi) NNE of Silkstone; 12.2 km (7.6 mi) S of Mourilyan; 19.8 km (12.3 mi) S of Innisfail; 107 km (66 mi) SSE of Cairns; 1,601 km (995 mi) NNW of Brisbane

Government
  - State electorate: Hill
  - Federal division: Kennedy

Area
  - Total: 14.3 km^{2} (5.5 sq mi)

Population
  - Total: 82 (2021 census)
  - Density: 5.73/km^{2} (14.85/sq mi)
- Time zone: UTC+10:00 (AEST)
- Postcode: 4871
Suburbs around Cowley
Sandy Pocket	Moresby	Cowley Beach
Warrubullen	Cowley	Cowley Beach
Cowley Creek	Goolboo; McCutcheon	Lower Cowley

Cowley is a rural locality in the Cassowary Coast Region, Queensland, Australia. In the 2021 census, Cowley had a population of 82 people.

== Geography ==
The land use is predominantly crop growing, particularly sugarcane and bananas. There is also some grazing on native vegetation.

== History ==
Cowley State School opened in 1924 and closed circa 1940.

The locality takes its name from the town of Cowley Beach which was formerly named Inarlinga, but which was renamed on 16 November 1991 after the name of the beach. The beach was named after horticulturalist Ebenezer Cowley who was the overseer at Kamerunga State Nursery.

== Demographics ==
In the 2016 census, Cowley had a population of 87 people.

In the 2021 census, Cowley had a population of 82 people.

== Education ==
There are no schools in Cowley. The nearest government primary schools are Mourilyan State School in Mourilyan to the north and Silkwood State School in Silkwood to the south-west. The nearest government secondary school is Innisfail State College in Innisfail Estate to the north.
