= Daveson, Queensland =

Daveson
- Suburb
- Interactive map of Daveson
- Coordinates: 17.7808°S 146.0375°E
- Country: Australia
- State: Queensland
- LGA: Cassowary Coast Region
- Location: 20.7 km (12.9 mi) NNE of Tully; 32.6 km (20.3 mi) S of Innisfail; 120 km (75 mi) S of Cairns; 227 km (141 mi) NNW of Townsville; 1,575 km (979 mi) NNW of Brisbane

Government
  - State electorate: Hill
  - Federal division: Kennedy

Area
  - Total: 15.9 km^{2} (6.1 sq mi)

Population
  - Total: 33 (2021 census)
  - Density: 2.08/km^{2} (5.38/sq mi)
- Time zone: UTC+10:00 (AEST)
- Postcode: 4855
Suburbs around Daveson
Silkwood	Silkwood	Kurrimine Beach
Jaffa	Daveson	Kurrimine Beach
El Arish	Maria Creeks	Midgeree Bar

Daveson is a rural locality in the Cassowary Coast Region, Queensland, Australia. In the 2021 census, Daveson had a population of 33 people.

== Geography ==
The locality is bounded to the east by the North Coast railway line and to the south by Kaygaroo Creek.

The Bruce Highway enters the locality from the south-west (El Arish) and exits to the north-west (Silkwood).

Daveson is a farming area that grows large fields of sugar cane. Daveson is also home to cattle farms. There is a network of cane tramways to transport the harvested sugarcane to the South Johnstone sugar mill.

== History ==
The locality name is derived from the Daveson family. Alfred James Daveson was an early settler in the district and prominent in local businesses and local government.

Jaffa railway station is an abandoned railway station on North Coast railway line (17.7802°S 146.0093°E).

== Demographics ==
In the 2016 census, Daveson had a population of 23 people.

In the 2021 census, Daveson had a population of 33 people.

== Education ==
There are no schools in Daveson. The nearest government primary schools are El Arish State School in neighbouring El Arish to the south-west and Silkwood State School in neighbouring Silkwood to the north-west. The nearest government secondary school is Tully State High School in Tully to the south-west. There is also a Catholic primary school in Silkwood.
