= Lindquist Island =

Island in Queensland, Australia

- Location within Queensland

Geography
- Location: Northern Australia
- Coordinates: 17.656667°S 146.159444°E
- Area: 0.07 km^{2} (0.027 sq mi)

Administration
- Australia
- State: Queensland

Lindquist Island is an island in Queensland, Australia. It is within the locality of Cowley Beach in Cassowary Coast Region. It forms part of the Cowley Beach Training Area military base.

== Geography ==
The island is about 90 km north of Dunk Island and east of the mainland part of Cowley Beach Training Area near Double Point and north of the South Barnard Islands. It is around 7 hectares or 0.07 square km in size.

Lindquist Island is part of the North Barnard Islands.

This island is protected by the EPA Queensland in that migratory birds rest here.

The island is also a site for popular tourist kayaking and there have been sightings of Humpback whales.
