= Cowley Beach Training Area =

Military training area in Queensland, Australia

- Australia

Site information
- Type: Army training area (1962–present)
- Operator: Australian Army (1962–present)

Location
- Coordinates: 17°42′21″S 146°06′47″E

The Cowley Beach Training Area (CBTA) is a military installation in Cowley Beach near Innisfail, Queensland, Australia. Military exercises are conducted there.

== History ==
The base was established in 1962, as the home for the Joint Tropical Research Unit (JTRU).

The training area is approximately 5,000 hectares (12,000 acres) in size, including Lindquist Island (approximately 1 km offshore) and is located 90 km south of Cairns.
