= Missionary Sisters of the Immaculate Conception of the Mother of God =

Roman Catholic religious congregation for women

The Missionary Sisters of the Immaculate Conception of the Mother of God (abbreviated SMIC) are an institute of religious sisters in the Roman Catholic Church. The congregation belongs to the Third Order Regular of St. Francis. They were founded in 1910 in Santarém, Brazil, by Armand August Bahlmann, OFM, and Mother Immaculata (born Elizabeth Tombrock), both natives of Germany, to educate the children of the poor throughout the world.

== The founders ==
=== The bishop ===
Armand Bahlmann was born in Essen, Germany, on 8 May 1862. He grew up a devout but strong-willed boy, wanting to become a missionary. To that end, he joined the Order of Friars Minor when he was of age. He was ordained a Catholic priest on 22 September 1888, and served in various works of the Order in his homeland, earning two doctorates, before being assigned to serve in the missions of the Order in Santarém, Brazil. In January 1907 he was appointed Territorial Prelate of the region by the Holy See. He went to Rome, where he was consecrated a bishop on 19 July of that year, by Cardinal Girolamo Maria Gotti, OCD, the Prefect of the Propagation of the Faith.

In the course of his service in the country Bahlmann developed a desire to establish a community of teaching Sisters for the children of the region. For this, he enlisted a small community of cloistered Conceptionist nuns established in the region, who were at time a branch of the Poor Clares, the contemplative Second Order within the Franciscan Order, founded in Spain in the 15th century. As contemplatives, however, they lacked the experience and training for teaching. He had this on his mind when he traveled to Germany on a fundraising trip. It was in the course of this trip that he met the woman who would help him fulfill his plans.

=== The teacher ===
==== Early life ====
Elizabeth Tombrock was born in Ahlen, Germany, on 14 November 1887. She was a frail child, prone to ill health. Early in her life, she learned to love God and would accompany her mother in visiting the sick and bringing food to the poor. When she was a teenager she joined the Third Order of St. Francis. The young Tombrock developed a great love for children and chose to become a teacher. As a teacher, she devoted herself to educating her charges with knowledge, life values, and a great love for Jesus and his mother. Her career was cut short, however, as she was diagnosed with tuberculosis in her bones in 1920. Eventually she was diagnosed as incurable and advised to prepare for her death.

==== Miracle and vocation ====
Not abandoning hope, Tombrock made a pilgrimage to the famed Sanctuary of Our Lady of Lourdes in France, noted for the many healing miracles which had taken place there. Arriving there on 15 August 1909, she took part in a religious ceremony. In the course of that service, she seemed to become unconscious for some twenty minutes. Later she recounted that she had been conscious during that time, but was filled with the fullness of happiness...my heart was too weak to endure. Feeling changed, Tombrock went to one of the physicians stationed there to monitor the health of the pilgrims. She was found to have been totally cured of the disease.

Back in her beloved classroom, Tombrock knew she wanted to dedicate her life to God. She struggled, however, whether to enter the cloistered Poor Clares or to volunteer as a missionary for overseas service. At that point, she and Bahlmann came into contact with one another. Later, Tombrock was in the process of writing a letter to the Poor Clares seeking admission to the cloister. She stopped and knelt in prayer for final guidance in this step. At that moment, there was a knock at the door and she received a telegram from Bishop Bahlmann, asking her if she were willing to become a missionary in Brazil and teach poor children there. Tombrock felt that this was her answer from God.

==== The missions ====
After an abbreviated period of training in the life of the Poor Clares, Tombrock was conditionally received into the Order of St. Clare and given the habit of the Franciscan Second Order on 15 August 1910, the anniversary of her miraculous healing. At that time, she received the religious name Maria Immaculata of Jesus. Soon after that she and Bahlmann set sail for Brazil.

== Foundation ==
=== Missionary Poor Clares ===
The pair arrived in Santarém on 5 December 1910, when Mother Immaculata joined four Conceptionist nuns who had agreed to join the bishop's new venture. Together they moved into an old mansion, which was to serve as their monastery as well as an orphanage and school. The small community then began their canonical novitiate. The house was in poor condition, and the town was a poor one. Yet, despite continued poor health due to the climate and diet, Mother Immaculata led the group successfully. After a brief fundraising and recruiting trip to Germany, she was professed on the Feast of the Epiphany (6 January) 1916. The next day she was formally appointed as abbess of the community by Bahlmann.

Under the protection of Bahlmann, who dealt with most of the legal hurdles in establishing the community and the work, Mother Immaculata led and shaped a community composed of both native Brazilians and German women in Santarém, plus a house of formation in Germany. The financial struggles remained, though. Bishop Bahlmann and Mother Immaculata embarked on a fundraising trip to the United States in 1922. There she received a solution to their money worries, but not an easy one. The Franciscan friars of the Province of the Holy Name offered to subsidize the works of her community, if they would handle the food services for the friars' institution of higher learning, St. Bonaventure University, in central New York State.

=== St. Bonaventure University ===
Mother Immaculata was reluctant to commit her community to this work, but eventually concluded that it was the best solution to their financial stability. She summoned a group of nuns and established a small convent for them on the grounds of the university. It was a struggle for them, even the Germans, as their training had been as teachers, not the feeding of hundreds of friars, seminarians, professors and students. Mother Immaculata resumed her fundraising tour around the country. On her return to the university during 1923, preparing to go back to Brazil, she found the nuns struggling with their new tasks and went to help.

The abbess wanted to help and was carrying a basket of cutlery when she suffered a heart attack. Even worse, she was on some stairs at the time, and suffered a severe fall, which left her unable to walk. She was diagnosed as having badly damaged her shoulder and having displacing two ribs. She was referred to a hospital in New York City, where she was advised that she would eventually be paralyzed for the rest of her life, and that she could not survive a trip to Brazil. She was never to return there.

During that trip, Mother Immaculata purchased an old farmhouse in Paterson, New Jersey, where she established the novitiate of the congregation. Early in 1924, the abbess became bedridden and in July of that year was transported to the convent at St. Bonaventure, where she spent the rest of her life.

== Missionary Sisters ==
Mother Immaculata proceeded to govern the communities of the monastery from her sickbed. Groups of young German women continued to join Brazilians in seeking admission to the community. Soon Pope Pius X asked the community to expand their field of labors to other countries in need. Changes in Church law at the time made a change of structure necessary. Thus, from the a community of nuns of the Second Franciscan Order, the community became a congregation of Religious Sisters of the Franciscan Third Order Regular. Mother Immaculata's title changed from Abbess to Superior General, and a council was established of four Sisters to assist in the governance of the new congregation. At that time, the name of the community was changed to the current one, indicating their origins in the Conceptionist Order, but showing their new status.

== Deaths of the founders ==
Mother Immaculata died peacefully in her bed at St. Bonaventure on 23 April 1938, surrounded by her Sisters. After 32 years as Prelate of Santarém, Bahlmann died in that post on 5 March 1939.

== Currently ==
In their response to the call of the pope, the congregation established missions in China, which, after the Chinese Communist Revolution, were forced to relocate to Taiwan, but recently some of the Sisters have returned to the mainland to work. They now also serve in Angola, Bolivia and Namibia.

The Missionary Sisters remained at St. Bonaventure until the 1960s. At that point, they moved the administration of the congregation to the novitiate in Paterson. In the United States, besides New Jersey, they serve in California, Maine, New Mexico, Texas and Washington, D.C.

== Notable members ==
A Brazilian member of the congregation has gained international renown, Irmã Dulce Pontes, SMIC, (1914–1992). From the time she joined the congregation, she became a leading social activist, caring for the poor and defending the rights of workers in that country.

At the time of her death, Pontes had been nominated for the Nobel Peace Prize, she had received two personal audiences with Pope John Paul II, and she had, almost single-handedly, created one of the largest and most respected philanthropic organizations in Brazil, the Social Works Foundation of Sister Dulce. She was named the most admired woman in the history of Brazil by the "Estado de São Paulo" paper, and the most influential religious person in Brazil during the 20th century, by "Isto É" magazine.
