= Sandy Pocket, Queensland =

Sandy Pocket
- Suburb
- Interactive map of Sandy Pocket
- Coordinates: 17.6613°S 146.0375°E
- Country: Australia
- State: Queensland
- LGA: Cassowary Coast Region
- Location: 9.4 km (5.8 mi) S of Mourilyan; 17.0 km (10.6 mi) S of Innisfail; 104 km (65 mi) S of Cairns; 243 km (151 mi) NNW of Townsville; 1,592 km (989 mi) NNW of Brisbane

Government
  - State electorate: Hill
  - Federal division: Kennedy

Area
  - Total: 5.3 km^{2} (2.0 sq mi)

Population
  - Total: 38 (2021 census)
  - Density: 7.17/km^{2} (18.6/sq mi)
- Time zone: UTC+10:00 (AEST)
- Postcode: 4871
Suburbs around Sandy Pocket
Moresby	Moresby	Moresby
Warrubullen	Sandy Pocket	Cowley
Warrubullen	Cowley	Cowley

Sandy Pocket is a rural locality in the Cassowary Coast Region, Queensland, Australia. In the 2021 census, Sandy Pocket had a population of 38 people.

== Geography ==
Little Moresby Creek and its tributary Boobah Creek form the northern boundary of the locality.

The Bruce Highway enters the locality from the south (Cowley) and exits to the north-west (Moresby).

The land use is a mixture of crop growing (mostly sugarcane) and grazing on native vegetation. There is a cane tramway network to transport the harvested sugarcane to the local sugar mill.

== Demographics ==
In the 2016 census, Sandy Pocket had a population of 37 people.

In the 2021 census, Sandy Pocket had a population of 38 people.

== Education ==
There are no schools in Sandy Pocket. The nearest government state school is Mourilyan State School in Mourilyan to the north. The nearest government secondary school is Innisfail State College in Innisfail Estate to the north.
