= Lower Cowley, Queensland =

Lower Cowley
- Suburb
- Interactive map of Lower Cowley
- Coordinates: 17.6963°S 146.0747°E
- Country: Australia
- State: Queensland
- LGA: Cassowary Coast Region
- Location: 10.2 km (6.3 mi) NW of Silkwood; 24.7 km (15.3 mi) S of Innisfail; 112 km (70 mi) SSW of Cairns; 241 km (150 mi) NNW of Townsville; 1,678 km (1,043 mi) NNW of Brisbane

Government
  - State electorate: Hill
  - Federal division: Kennedy

Area
  - Total: 12.0 km^{2} (4.6 sq mi)

Population
  - Total: 55 (2021 census)
  - Density: 4.58/km^{2} (11.87/sq mi)
- Time zone: UTC+10:00 (AEST)
- Postcode: 4871
Suburbs around Lower Cowley
Cowley	Cowley Beach	Cowley Beach
Cowley	Lower Cowley	Cowley Beach
McCutcheon	Kurrimine Beach	Kurrimine Beach

Lower Cowley is a rural locality in the Cassowary Coast Region, Queensland, Australia. In the 2021 census, Lower Cowley had a population of 55 people.

== Geography ==
Liverpool Creek flows through Lower Cowley and enters the Coral Sea at Cowley Beach. The land is flat and low-lying and is used to grow crops, predominantly sugarcane. There is a cane tramway through the locality to transport the harvested sugarcane to the local sugar mills.

== History ==
The locality takes its name from neighbouring Cowley Beach, which in turn is named after horticulturalist Ebenezer Cowley, who was the overseer at Kamerunga State Nursery.

Cowley Lower State School opened on 10 May 1937 and closed in 1956. It was on the eastern side of Gangemi Road (approx 17.69448°S 146.07519°E).

== Demographics ==
In the 2016 census, Lower Cowley had a population of 64 people.

In the 2021 census, Lower Cowley had a population of 55 people.

== Education ==
There are no schools in Lower Cowley. The nearest government primary school is Silkwood State School in Silkwood to the south-west. The nearest government secondary school is Innisfail State College in Innisfail Estate to the north.
