= Moresby, Queensland =

Moresby
- Town
- Interactive map of Moresby
- Coordinates: 17.6325°S 146.0280°E
- Country: Australia
- State: Queensland
- LGA: Cassowary Coast Region
- Location: 14.1 km (8.8 mi) S of Innisfail; 101 km (63 mi) S of Cairns; 246 km (153 mi) NNW of Townsville; 1,598 km (993 mi) NNW of Brisbane

Government
  - State electorate: Hill
  - Federal division: Kennedy

Area
  - Total: 13.5 km^{2} (5.2 sq mi)

Population
  - Total: 150 (2021 census)
  - Density: 11.1/km^{2} (28.8/sq mi)
- Time zone: UTC+10:00 (AEST)
- Postcode: 4871
Localities around Moresby
Boogan	Martyville	New Harbourline
Basilisk	Moresby	Cowley Beach
Warrubullen	Sandy Pocket	Cowley

Moresby is a rural town and locality in the Cassowary Coast Region, Queensland, Australia. In the 2021 census, the locality of Moresby had a population of 150 people.

== Geography ==
The town is north of centre within the locality. It is bounded in the north-east by the Moresby River, in the south-east by its tributary Little Moresby Creek and in the south by its tributary Boobah Creek.

The Bruce Highway traverses the locality from south to north, passing through the town. The North Coast railway line traverses the locality from the south-west to the north-west, passing to the west of the town, but there is no railway station within the locality. There are sugarcane tramways in the locality.

Most of the land in the locality is flat and low-lying (10 metres about sea level) and is used for crops, principally sugarcane. The land in the far west of the locality rises up toward peaks in neighbouring Basilisk; the lower levels are used for grazing while the upper levels are not cleared.

== History ==
The town takes its name from the Moresby Range, which was named by explorer George Elphinstone Dalrymple after hydrographer Captain John Moresby of HMS Basilisk.

Moresby State School opened in August 1915 with 11 students with teacher Miss Mary Agnes McGuigan. In 1928, the school building was relocated from Kaban for re-erection at Moresby. Moresby State School closed on 9 September 2014. The school was at 2-20 Moresby Road (17.63466°S 146.02829°E). The school's website was archived.

== Demographics ==
In the 2016 census, the locality of Moresby had a population of 149 people.

In the 2021 census, the locality of Moresby had a population of 150 people.

== Education ==
There are no schools in Moresby. The nearest government primary schools are Mourilyan State School in Mourilyan to the north and South Johnstone State School in South Johnstone to the north-west. The nearest government secondary school is Innisfail State College in Innisfail Estate to the north. There are also non-government schools in the Innisfail area.
