= Goolboo, Queensland =

Goolboo
- Suburb
- Interactive map of Goolboo
- Coordinates: 17.7233°S 146.0280°E
- Country: Australia
- State: Queensland
- LGA: Cassowary Coast Region
- Location: 26.8 km (16.7 mi) S of Innisfail; 29.6 km (18.4 mi) NNE of Tully; 114 km (71 mi) S of Cairns; 236 km (147 mi) N of Townsville; 1,598 km (993 mi) NNW of Brisbane

Government
  - State electorate: Hill
  - Federal division: Kennedy

Area
  - Total: 5.6 km^{2} (2.2 sq mi)

Population
  - Total: 25 (2021 census)
  - Density: 4.46/km^{2} (11.6/sq mi)
- Time zone: UTC+10:00 (AEST)
- Postcode: 4856
Suburbs around Goolboo
Warrubullen	Cowley Creek	Cowley
No 5 Branch	Goolboo	McCutcheon
Silkwood	Silkwood	McCutcheon

Goolboo is a rural locality in the Cassowary Coast Region of Queensland, Australia. In the 2021 census, Goolboo had a population of 25 people.

== Geography ==
The locality is bounded to the west, north-west, north, and north-east by Liverpool Creek, which eventually flows into the Coral Sea.

The Bruce Highway enters the locality from the south (Silkwood) and exits to the locality to the north-east (Cowley).

The North Coast railway line enters the locality from the south-west (Silkwood) and exits to the north-west (Warrubullen). The locality was served by the now-abandoned Goolboo railway station (17.7175°S 146.0206°E).

The land use is crop growing, predominantly sugarcane. There is a cane tramway network to transport the harvested sugarcane to the South Johnstone sugar mill.

== History ==
The name of the locality originates from a former railway station, which was given the name by the Queensland Railways Department on 4 December, 1924. The name "Goolboo" is derived from an Aboriginal word meaning magpie.

== Demographics ==
In the 2016 census, Goolboo had a population of 19 people.

In the 2021 census, Goolboo had a population of 25 people.

== Education ==
There are no schools in Goolboo. The nearest government primary school is Silkwood State School in neighbouring Silkwood to the south. The nearest government secondary schools are Innisfail State College in Innisfail Estate to the north and Tully State High School in Tully to the south-west.
