= Dulce de Souza Lopes Pontes =

Brazilian Franciscan Sister and social activist declared a saint by the Catholic Church

Saint Dulce de Souza Lopes Pontes SMIC
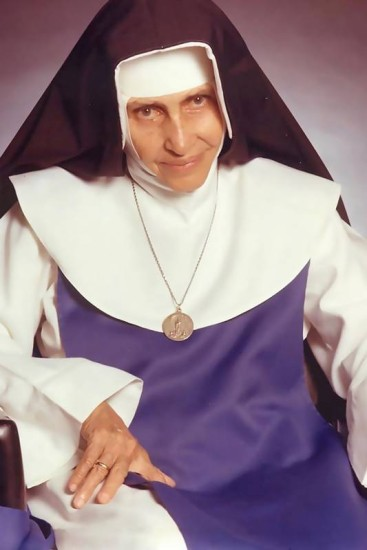

Missionary
- Born: Maria Rita de Souza Pontes; 26 May 1914; Salvador, Bahia, Brazil
- Died: 13 March 1992 (aged 77); Salvador, Bahia, Brazil
- Venerated in: Catholic Church
- Beatified: 22 May 2011, Church of Our Lady of Hope, Salvador, Bahia, Brazil by Cardinal Geraldo Majella Agnelo
- Canonized: 13 October 2019, Saint Peter's Square, Vatican City by Pope Francis
- Major shrine: Sanctuary of the Immaculate Conception of the Mother of God, Salvador, Bahia
- Feast: 13 August
- Major works: Founding Charitable Works Foundation of Sister Dulce

Dulce de Souza Lopes Pontes, SMIC, widely known as Irmã Dulce ("Sister Dulce") and also as Saint Dulce of the Poor (born Maria Rita de Souza Pontes; 26 May 1914 – 13 March 1992), was a Brazilian Missionary Sister of the Immaculate Conception of the Mother of God. The Missionary Sisters of the Immaculate Conception belong to the Third Order Regular of St. Francis. Dulce de Souza Lopes Pontes was the founder of the Obras Sociais Irmã Dulce ("Charitable Works Foundation of Sister Dulce") and was known worldwide as an advocate for the poor of her country.

In 1949, Pontes started caring for the poorest of the poor in her convent's chicken yard in Salvador, Bahia. Today, more than 3,000 people arrive every day at this same site (where the Santo Antônio Hospital now stands) to receive free medical treatment. She also established CESA, a school for the poor in Simões Filho, one of the most impoverished cities in the state of Bahia.

At the time of her death in 1992, Pontes had been nominated for the Nobel Peace Prize, she had received two personal audiences with Pope John Paul II, and she had played a huge role in creating one of the largest and most respected philanthropic organizations in Brazil. She was named the most admired woman in the history of Brazil by O Estado de S. Paulo newspaper and the most influential religious person in Brazil during the 20th century, by ISTOÉ magazine.

In 2011, Pontes was beatified with papal approval by Cardinal Geraldo Majella Agnelo, the penultimate step toward sainthood. In May 2019, Pope Francis, during an audience given to the Congregation for the Causes of Saints Prefect Giovanni Angelo Becciu, recognized a second miracle, which was needed to declare her a saint. She was canonized by Pope Francis on 13 October 2019, making her the first Brazilian female saint.

== Early life ==
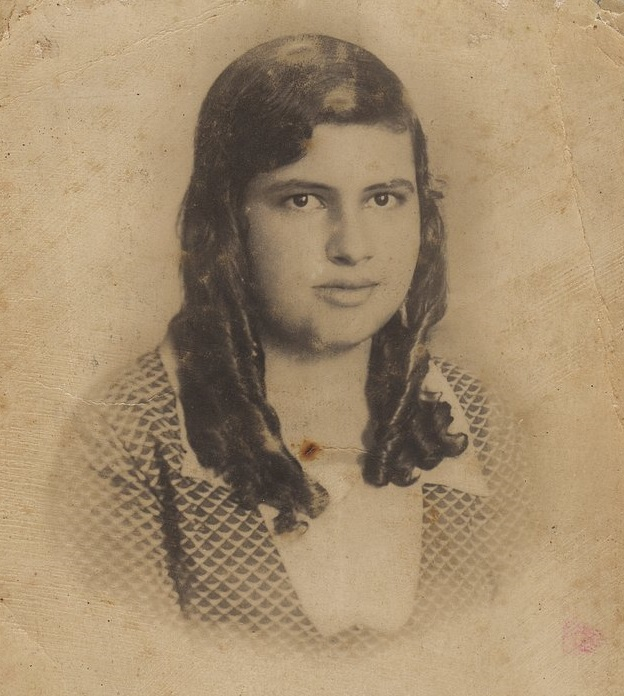
Maria Rita at 13 years old

Born in Salvador, Bahia, the second daughter of Augusto Lopes Pontes and Dulce Maria de Souza, as Maria Rita de Souza Pontes, she entered religious life when she was 18 years old. When she was thirteen years old, her aunt had taken her on a trip to the poor area of the city. The sight of the misery and poverty she encountered there made a deep impression on the young girl, who came from an upper middle-class background.

She began to care for the homeless and beggars in her neighborhood, giving them free haircuts and treating their wounds. By that time, she had already shown interest in following religious life.

== Graduation and religious life ==
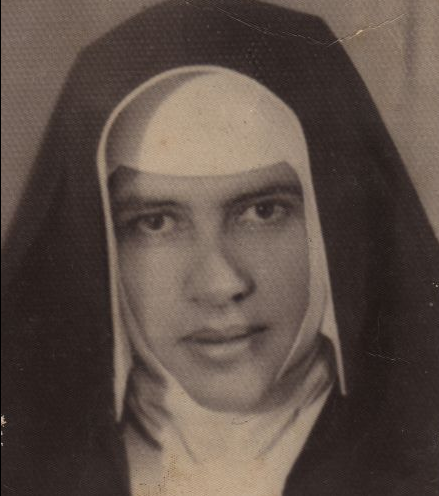
Sister Dulce Pontes in 1935

She graduated from high school at the age of 18. She, then, asked her father to allow her to follow her religious calling. He agreed and she joined the Congregation of the Missionary Sisters of the Immaculate Conception of the Mother of God, in Our Lady of Carmel Convent, in Sergipe. A year later, she received the habit of that congregation and was given the name "Dulce", in memory of her mother (who had died when she was 6 years old).

== Social works ==
During the same year, she founded the "São Francisco's Worker's Union", the first Christian worker's movement in Bahia. A year later, she started welfare work in the poor communities of Alagados and Itapagipe. It was then that they started calling her the "Angel of Alagados". In 1937, she transformed the Worker's Union into the Worker's Center of Bahia.

Determined to house sick people who came to her for help, in 1939 Pontes started to shelter them in abandoned houses in Salvador's 'Ilha dos Ratos' (rats' island) district. Then she would go in search of food, medicine and medical care. Later, when she and her patients were evicted from the neighborhood, she started housing them in an old fish market, but City Hall denied her the use of the space and told her to leave.

Facing a big problem and already taking care of over 70 people, she turned to the Mother Superior of her convent and asked her permission to use the convent's chicken yard as an improvised hostel. The Superior reluctantly agreed, so long as Pontes could take care of the chickens (which she did, by feeding them to her patients). That improvised hostel gave rise to the Hospital Santo Antonio, the center of a medical, social and educational complex which continues to open doors for the poor in Bahia and throughout Brazil.

== The foundation of OSID ==
There, in 1960, the Santo Antônio Hospital, consisting of 150 beds, was inaugurated. On 26 May 1959 the Charitable Works Foundation of Sister Dulce was born, a result of the determination of a religious sister who was tireless in her attendance to the sick and to the beggars who lived on Salvador's streets.

Pontes's work impressed the President of Brazil, José Sarney, who in 1988 nominated her for the Nobel Peace Prize, with support of Queen Silvia of Sweden.

The organization she founded, known by its Portuguese acronym as OSID (Obras Sociais Irmã Dulce), is one of the most well-known and respected philanthropic organizations in Brazil.

== OSID ==
The Charitable Works Foundation of Sister Dulce is a private charity chartered under Brazilian law. It is accredited at federal, state and municipal levels and registered by the National Welfare Council and the Federal Ministry of Education.

OSID provides health, welfare and education services, with a strong commitment to medical education and research.

The Santo Antônio Hospital is the largest completely free hospital in Brazil, according to the Federal Ministry of Health. It has over 1,000 beds and receives more than 3,000 patients every day.

OSID also established CESA (Santo Antônio Educational Center), a school for the poor in Simões Filho, one of the most impoverished cities in the Metropolitan Area of Salvador and in the State of Bahia. There, OSID provides free educational programs for approximately 800 children and young people ranging in age from 6 to 19 years old.

CESA offers basic education in accordance with the guidelines of the Brazilian Federal Ministry of Education. In addition, CESA has developed a complementary program of educational, physical and professional development activities to help students learn more effectively and enrich their lives.

It also operates a commercial bakery and an orthopedic production center, staffed by professional workers, which produce and sell their products in many regions of Brazil and internationally, following the idea of self-sustainability which is part of the work concept created by Pontes.

== Health problems, death and burial ==
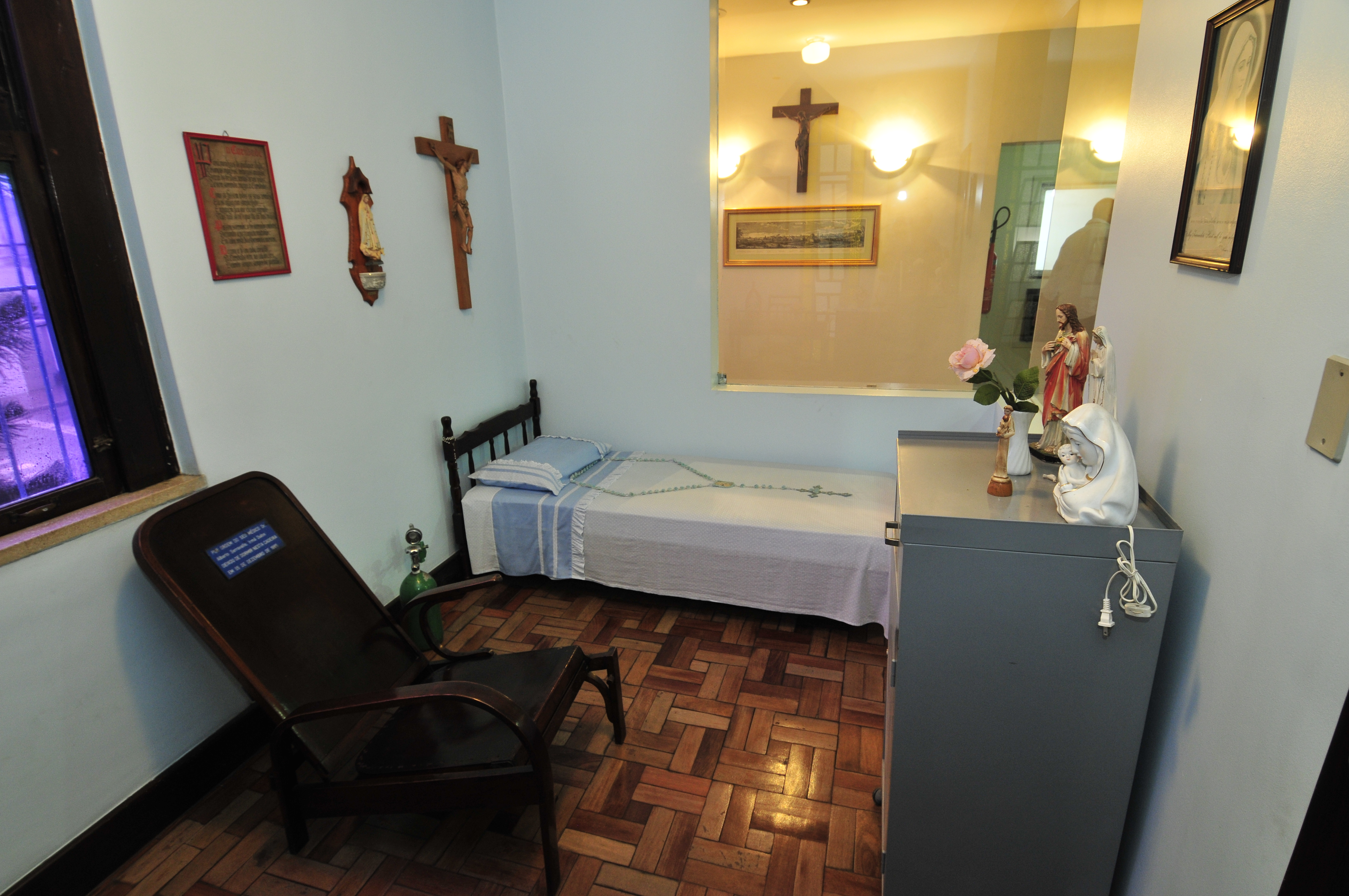
Her room at OSID headquarters, preserved as a memorial after her death

During the last 30 years of her life, Pontes's lungs were highly impaired and she had only 30% breathing capacity. In 1990, her respiratory problems began to worsen and she was hospitalized. It was in her sick bed that she received the visit of Pope John Paul II (whom she had met, for the first time, in 1980).

After being hospitalized for 16 months, Pontes died on 13 March 1992, at the age of 77, in Santo Antônio's Convent, and she was buried at the Basilica of Our Lady of the Immaculate Conception. On 26 May 2000, her body was transferred to the Chapel of Santo Antônio Convent.

On 9 June 2010, Pontes was finally buried at the Imaculada Conceição da Madre de Deus church, in Salvador, Bahia. It was discovered that her body was naturally incorrupt and even her clothes were still preserved 18 years after her death.

== Beatification and canonisation ==
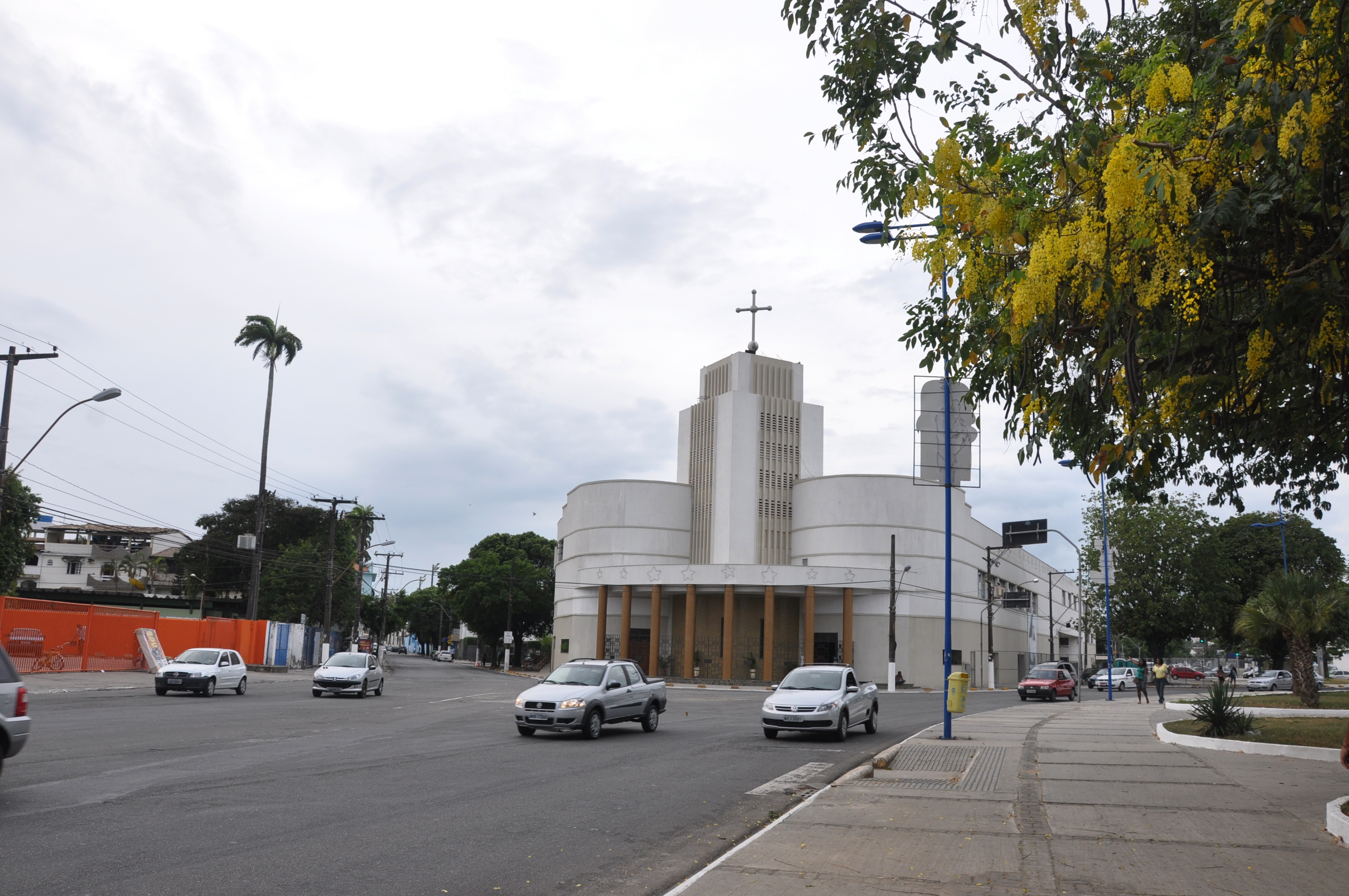
Her sanctuary, the place where she is buried and which receives visits from many of the nun's devotees

Pontes received the title Servant of God under Pope John Paul II with the beginning of the cause for her beatification in January 2000 under the Archbishop of Salvador da Bahia and Primate of Brazil, Geraldo Majella Agnelo, who examined her heroic virtues, fame of sainthood and the tireless determination of a life dedicated to the needy.

In June 2001 the process continued in the Congregation for the Causes of the Saints. In June 2003 the Congregation received the positio. At that same time, the Congregation recognized a miracle attributed to the intercession of Pontes.

On 10 May 2007, in a meeting with Pope Benedict XVI during his visit to Brazil, the Governor of São Paulo and former Presidential candidate José Serra said he would send a letter to the Holy See in favor of Pontes's beatification.

On 20 January 2009, the Congregation for the Causes of Saints unanimously recommended to Pope Benedict XVI that he proclaim Pontes's heroic virtue. Pope Benedict XVI approved and on 3 April 2009 granted her the title Venerable. Pontes's body was exhumed and examined on 9 July 2010 as part of the beatification process, and was found to be still incorrupt.

On 27 October 2010, the Archbishop of Salvador announced that the Congregation for the Causes of Saints had recognized a miracle attributed to her intercession, paving the way for her to be beatified. The pope officially approved on 10 December 2010. Pontes was beatified in a Mass on 22 May 2011, in Salvador, Bahia. The Mass was presided over by the Archbishop of Salvador and the Primate of Brazil, Cardinal Geraldo Majella Agnelo, who conducted the beatification by mandate of Pope Benedict XVI; the service was attended by about 70,000 people. President Dilma Rousseff and Governor Jaques Wagner also attended.

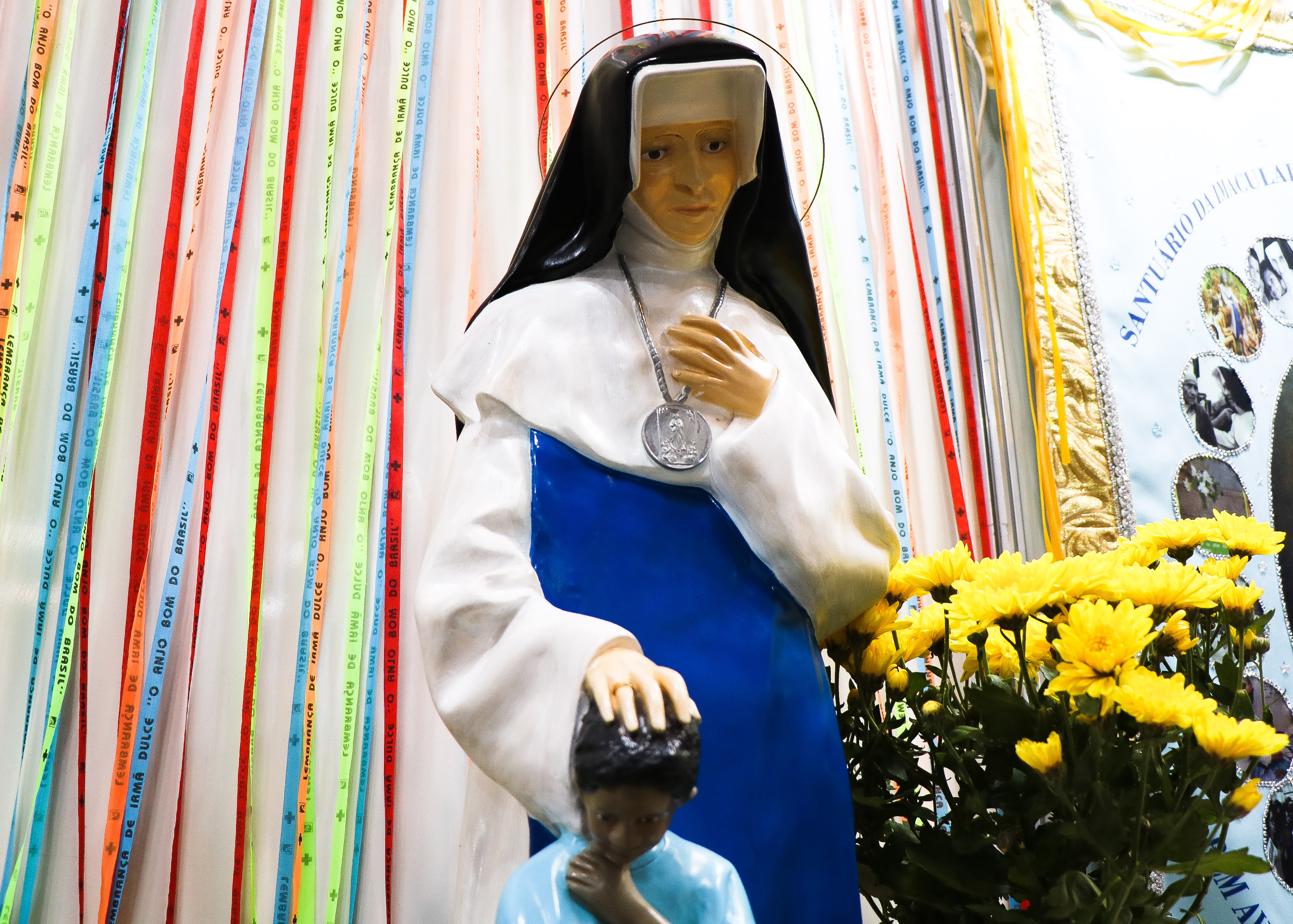
Devotional statue of Saint Dulce of the Poor

On 13 May 2019, Congregation of Saints Prefect Angelo Becciu approved a miracle. The decree recognizing the second miracle was then signed by Pope Francis, thus ensuring that Pontes would be canonized. It was announced on 1 July 2019 that Pontes would be canonized with four others on 13 October 2019, making her the first Brazilian female saint.

== See also ==
- Catholic Church in Brazil
