= Crowley, Oregon =

Crowley, Oregon may refer to:

- Crowley, Malheur County, Oregon, a populated place and former post office from 1911 to 1935
- Crowley, Polk County, Oregon, a locale and former post office from 1881 to 1904
