= Cowley High School =

Cowley High School can refer to:

- Cowley High School, Wyoming - former high school in Cowley, Wyoming, United States. Replaced by Rocky Mountain High School (Wyoming)
- Cowley High School, Lancashire - former grammar school founded by Sarah Cowley in St. Helens, Lancashire, United Kingdom. After amalgamation of the separate schools for boys and girls, renamed to Cowley International College.
