= Kurrimine Beach, Queensland =

Kurrimine Beach
- Town
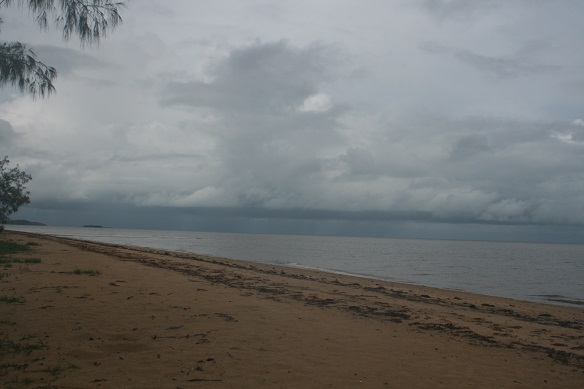
- Kurrimine Beach

- Interactive map of Kurrimine Beach
- Coordinates: 17.7797°S 146.1038°E
- Country: Australia
- State: Queensland
- LGA: Cassowary Coast Region
- Location: 34.6 km (21.5 mi) NW of Tully; 37.6 km (23.4 mi) SSE of Innisfail; 125 km (78 mi) SSE of Cairns; 241 km (150 mi) NNW of Townsville; 1,572 km (977 mi) NNW of Brisbane

Government
  - State electorate: Hill
  - Federal division: Kennedy

Area
  - Total: 143.4 km^{2} (55.4 sq mi)

Population
  - Total: 742 (2021 census)
  - Density: 5.174/km^{2} (13.401/sq mi)
- Time zone: UTC+10:00 (AEST)
- Postcode: 4871
Localities around Kurrimine Beach
McCutcheon	Lower Cowley	Cowley Beach
Silkwood	Kurrimine Beach	Coral Sea
Daveson	Midgeree Bar	Garners Beach

Kurrimine Beach is a coastal town and locality in the Cassowary Coast Region, Queensland, Australia. In the 2021 census, the locality of Kurrimine Beach had a population of 742 people.

== Geography ==
The Coral Sea forms the eastern boundary. The Kurrimine Beach National Park and Maria Creek National Park are within the locality.

== History ==
The town was originally called Kurrimine which is believed to be an Aboriginal word meaning sunrise or dawn. It was renamed Kurrimine Beach on 1 March 1982.

== Demographics ==
In the 2016 census, the locality of Kurrimine Beach had a population of 729 people.

In the 2021 census, the locality of Kurrimine Beach had a population of 742 people.

== Education ==
There are no schools in Kurrimine Beach. The nearest government secondary school is Silkwood State School in neighbouring Silkwood to the west. The nearest government secondary schools are Tully State High School in Tully to the south-west and Innisfail State College in Innisfail Estate to the north.
