= Cowley Creek, Queensland =

Cowley Creek
- Suburb
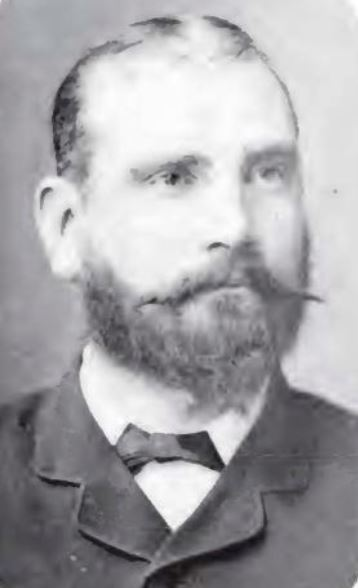
- Ebenezer Cowley, 1890

- Interactive map of Cowley Creek
- Coordinates: 17.6958°S 146.0327°E
- Country: Australia
- State: Queensland
- LGA: Cassowary Coast Region
- Location: 7.1 km (4.4 mi) NNE of Silkwood; 25.6 km (15.9 mi) S of Innisfail; 113 km (70 mi) SSE of Cairns; 237 km (147 mi) NNW of Townsville; 1,594 km (990 mi) NNW of Brisbane

Government
  - State electorate: Hill
  - Federal division: Kennedy

Area
  - Total: 7.7 km^{2} (3.0 sq mi)

Population
  - Total: 0 (2021 census)
  - Density: 0.00/km^{2} (0.00/sq mi)
- Time zone: UTC+10:00 (AEST)
- Postcode: 4871
Suburbs around Cowley Creek
Warrubullen	Warrubullen	Cowley
Warrubullen	Cowley Creek	Cowley
Warrubullen	Goolboo	Cowley

Cowley Creek is a rural locality in the Cassowary Coast Region, Queensland, Australia. In the 2021 census, Cowley Creek had "no people or a very low population".

== Geography ==
Liverpool Creek forms the southern boundary of the locality, entering from the south-west (Warrubullen / Goolboo) and exiting to the south-east (Goolboo / Cowley).

The watercourse Cowley Creek enters the locality from the west (Warrubullen) and flows south-east through the locality becoming a tributary of Liverpool Creek on the south-eastern boundary of the locality (17.70864°S 146.04000°E).

The land use is predominantly crop growing and aquaculture. The Cowley Aquaculture Farm is a freshwater barramundi farm with 38 ponds with a surface area of approximately 55 hectares (140 acres), producing 1,150 tonnes of whole fish annually.

== History ==
The name Cowley refers to Ebenezer Cowley (1849?-1899), who was a horticulturalist and overseer at Kamerunga State Nursery.

== Demographics ==
In the 2016 census, Cowley Creek had a population of 13 people.

In the 2021 census, Cowley Creek had "no people or a very low population".

== Education ==
There are no schools in Cowley Creek. The nearest government primary school is Silkwood State School in Silkwood to the south-west. The nearest government secondary school is Innisfail State College in Innisfail Estate to the north. There are also non-government schools in Silkwood and in Innisfail and its suburbs.
