= Obras Sociais Irmã Dulce =

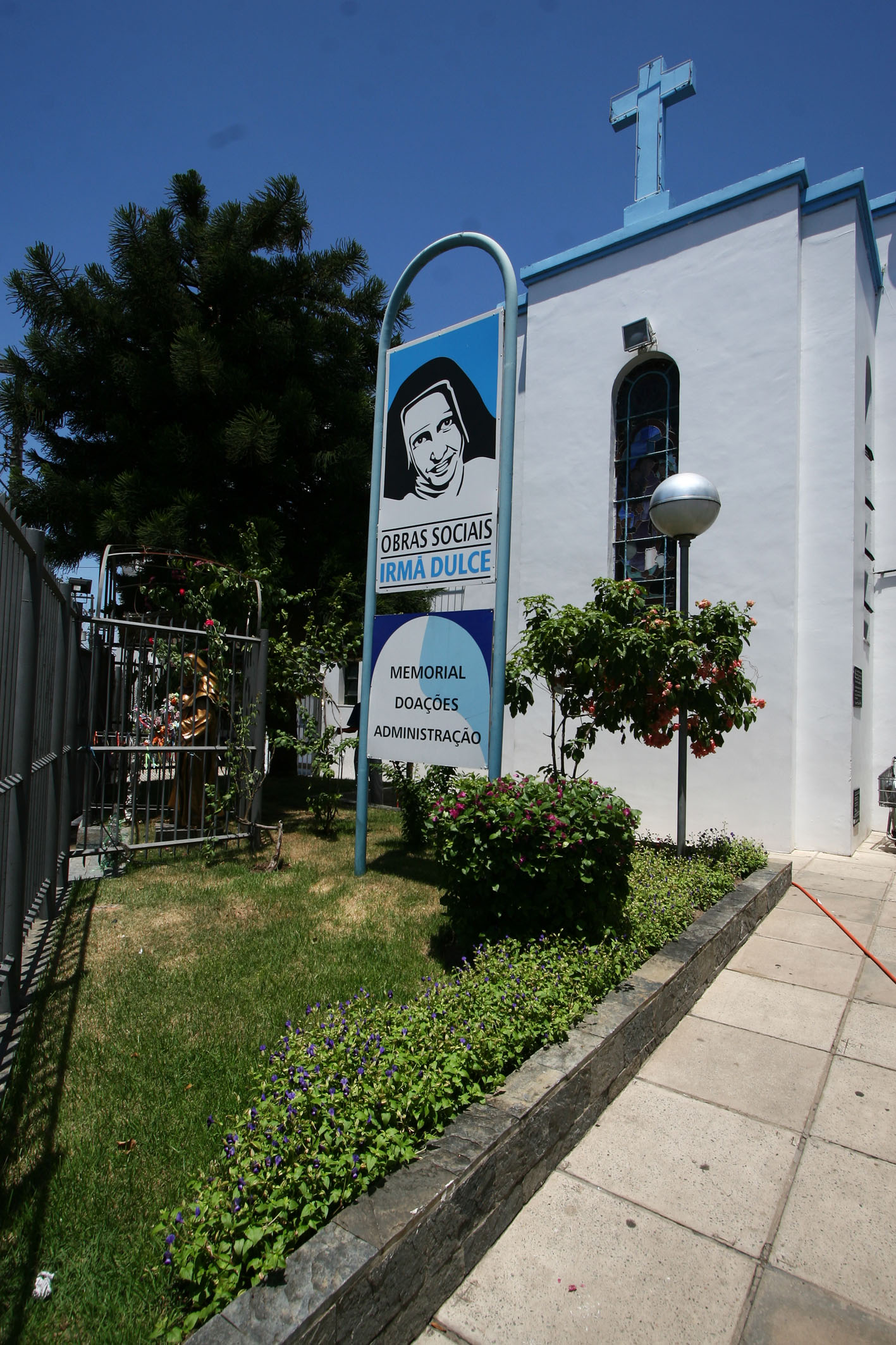
OSID image

The Charitable Works Foundation of Sister Dulce, known by its Portuguese acronym as OSID, is a private non-profit philanthropic organization, established on May 26, 1959 by the Brazilian religious sister Dulce de Souza Lopes Pontes.

OSID consists of 14 nuclei, 13 of them at the Roma Hospital Complex, a 1,000-bed teaching hospital, in Salvador, Bahia. OSID also operates CESA (Santo Antonio Educational Center), a school that provides free education and social services for 800 children who live in extreme poverty, in Simões Filho, one of the most impoverished cities in the metropolitan region of Salvador de Bahia.

OSID provides health, welfare, and education services, with a strong commitment to medical education and research and a mission to "love and serve the poorest ones, offering them free health care and education".

It is chartered under Brazilian law; accredited at federal, state, and municipal levels; and registered by the National Welfare Council and the Federal Ministry of Education.

== History ==
OSID was founded by Sister Dulce in 1959, as a result of her work with the poor people in Salvador.

Since 1949, the Servant of God had been providing health care for over 70 people in her convent's chicken yard. Then, the lack of physical structure was compensated by Sister Dulce's tireless determination and managerial capacity and the volunteer support of friendly doctors and the community as a whole. Sister Dulce used to walk the streets both at night, searching for sick people who had nowhere to go, and during the day, collecting food, medicines and whatever else people donated.

In 1960, a year after the foundation of OSID, the Santo Antônio Hospital, then with 150 beds, was inaugurated.

During the 1960s and 1970s, the organization went through of structural consolidation. An advisory council was established in order to help Sister Dulce manage OSID. During that time, a medical residency program was put in place.

After that period, expanding the services and ensuring the permanence of OSID became the main concern of Sister Dulce. In 1983, the new 1.000 beds Santo Antônio Hospital was inaugurated. Relation with the business sector and with the government were increased and an effort is made to make the management of the organization more professional.

In the late 1980s, due to economical instability and increased patient demand, OSID wentthrough a financial crisis, which worsened with Sister Dulce's deteriorating health condition. The institution established an agreement with INAMPS (National Social Security Institute for Medical Assistance), currently INSS. The agreement was still valid after the federal public health system was unified by SUS (Sistema Único de Saúde, or United Health System).

At that time, already very debilitated, Sister Dulce expressed her wish that her niece Maria Rita Pontes was placed at the head of OSID, which takes place in 1992.

On March 13, 1992, Sister Dulce died. The death of its founder put the future of OSID in doubt and the institution focused on their mission, in order to overcome the obstacles.

In the decade after Sister Dulce's death, OSID inaugurated 6 new nuclei, along with a Pediatric and an Adult Intensive Care Center and the Center for Admission and Treatment of Alcoholics (CATA). The Santo Antonio Educacional Center started taking care of over 600 children, offering them free basic and technical education.

Since 2000, the organization reformed its organizational structure and invested in strategic areas like Information technology, research, communication and company history, in order to support the increase in services provided ant to make possible a secure planning in the next years, facing self-sustainability as its biggest challenge. In 2001, OSID was awarded the ISO 9001–2000 certificate.

After a period of planned growth, inflation, loss of revenue and even bigger increase in patient demand (21,75% in Santo Antônio Hospital), caused OSID to go through another financial crisis in 2003, forcing the management to cut down on its expenses severely.

== Present ==
Nowadays, 14 years after the death of its founder, OSID is the major health institution in the north and northeast of Brazil. OSID is responsible for the majority of patients service in the state of Bahia and is one of the top ten in the entire country.

It is the only health institution in Brazil with more than 1.000 beds provided exclusively on a public-care basis through SUS. The Roma Hospital Complex has 1.009 beds and houses, approximately, 400 in-patients in residencial care facilities for the elderly. The hallmark of OSID is humanized care and the practice of providing free services is faithful to Sister Dulce's wish of always keeping her door open to the needy.

Today, OSID owns 173.000 square meters of land, of which 39.000 square meters are occupied by constructed facilities at the Roma Hospital complex.

== OSID Nuclei ==
- Santo Antonio Hospital

With 17 medical specialties for patients, approximately 1,000 surgeries are performed each month at HSA. In 2002, HSA's surgical center was accredited under ISO 9001:2000 and registered 14,500 hospitalizations. The hospital has 10 wards, divided into Medical Care, Long-Term Medical Care (chronic patients), Surgery, Peritoneal Dialysis, Physiology, and an Intensive Care Unit (ICU). The hospital also houses a medical teaching unit, the Professor Adib Jatene Center, for Teaching and Research (CEPPAJ). Ten areas of medical specialization are offered by CEPPAJ and, at any given time, approximately 300 residents and interns are all working to receive their professional qualifications.

- José Sarney Ambulatory

The Ambulatory is the entrance door for all who come to OSID for health care. With 33 medical specialties and a Physical Therapy Unit complete with state-of-the-art equipment, the Ambulatory provides services to approximately 3,000 people every day (or a total of almost 100,000 patient services each month).

- Children's Hospital

The Children's Hospital is widely considered an exemplary model of humanistic services for pediatric patients. The hospital has 102 beds, an Intensive Care Unit (ICU), and a variety of surgical and clinical specializations. Providing services to children and adolescents up to the age of eighteen, the hospital's facilities are adapted to accommodate different age groups. The hospital's model of patient care relies heavily on support from mothers (and fathers) as care givers. The hospital, which combines health care and socio-educational programs such as the School in the Hospital and Family Health, is also an important resource in Bahia for the treatment of children who are victims of abuse. It is also the only health center in Bahia that complies with all the Ministry of Justice's requirements regarding the rights of hospitalized children and adolescents.

- Dona Dulcinha' Women Clinic

Focusing on holistic services for women, the D. Dulcinha Women's Clinic provided 128,000 patient services in 2005, including ambulatory and cancer prevention gynecology procedures. A strong focus on psychological assistance for patients and family planning guidance is an integral part of the clinic

- Center for the Rehabilitation and Prevention of Deficiencies (CRPD)

Giving priority to citizenship and the social insertion of people with special needs, CRPD provides out-patient and in-patient assistance to 123 residents. In 2005, its Information Technology Program, which was awarded the Banco do Brazil/Unesco Award of Social Technology, provided training and developmental activities for 150 students with special needs.

- Augusto Lopes Pontes Social Medical Center (CMSALP)

As a mirror of Sister Dulce's philosophy, the nucleus provides services to socially disabled patients (people who live on the streets, alcoholics, and those with moderate physical and mental disabilities). The center has 188 beds and recorded 1,051 in-patient services in 2005. At present, the center houses 30 residents—socially disabled patients with no family reference. CMSALP is also the only center in Bahia which provides in-patient services for alcoholics. In addition to recorded hospitalizations, the Center for Assisting and Treating Alcoholism (CATA) provided 11,743 out-patient services in 2005 including detoxification, welfare, social and psychological assistance, and occupational therapy.

- BioImaging

In 2005, the BioImaging Nuclei, equipped with state-of-the-art technology, performed 98,224 tests, including digestive tract endoscopies, mammograms, ultra-sonograms, echocardiograms, and tomograms (CAT scans). It is the only center in the state of Bahia to perform CAT scans on a public care basis through SUS (United Health System). For some procedures, the cost of the material, provided free-of-charge to patients, is more expensive than the costs reimbursed by the SUS.

- Rehabilitation Center for Craniofacial Anomalies (Centrinho)

Considered a national point of reference by the Ministry of Health for the correction of craniofacial anomalies, a condition which affects approximately 30,000 people in Bahia, Centrinho is Brazil's second leading recovery center for facial cleft patients. In 2005, it provided 134,416 patient services and 1,192 surgeries. Its multidisciplinary services focus on special areas including: Speech Therapy, Medical Care, Ortorhinology, Psychology, Pediatrics, Plastic Surgery, Nursing, Social Service, Odontology, Buccomaxilillary, Facial Surgery and Stomatology. The Antalgic Therapy Clinic, which is part of the nucleus, operates under the philosophy of holistic recovery and expert integration for the treatment of patients with chronic pain.

- Santo Antonio Educational Center

In Simões Filho, one of the poorest cities in the state of Bahia, OSID operates the Santo Antonio Educational Center (CESA—Centro Educacional Santo Antonio). At CESA, OSID provides free educational programs for approximately 800 children and youth ranging from 6 to 19 years of age. CESA offers basic education in accordance with the guidelines of the Brazilian Federal Ministry of Education. In addition, CESA has developed a complementary program of educational, physical and professional development activities to help students learn more effectively and enrich their lives.

In order to include these complementary activities, CESA has adopted a full-time educational model where the students spent the whole day at the institution participating in different types of activities meant to complement their elementary education within diversified learning environments. Students have access to a state-of-the-art computer laboratory and multi-media presentation center, a library, sports and entertainment programs including Capoeira, an Afro-Brazilian martial arts and dance discipline. There are also specialized courses for young people over the age of 17 who are preparing to become professional bakers and electricians and a special program to help young women prepare for careers in commercial decorating and painting.

Among the trade courses offered by the CESA, the bakery program offers a credential from SENAI (a federal training institution for technicians and tradesmen) and stands out, having achieved significant levels of job placement within the local economy.

OSID provides everything free-of-charge to CESA students, including basic health care, dental care, course materials, prepared meals and family counseling. All of this represents a tremendous advantage in a region where 85% of families survive on less than one US dollar a day per person and some families have no income whatsoever. OSID operates the programs at CESA in keeping with its core philosophy of helping at-risk children and youth recover their citizenship.

- Júlia Magalhães Geriatric Center

CGJM is the only institution in Bahia recognized by the Ministry of Health to provide a full range of services for the elderly including out-patients, in-patients, and members of the community. The center performed 49,745 procedures in 2005 in addition to the in-patient services provided for its 83 long-term residents. The center offers programs including Third Age Education, Gymnastics, Cultural and Familiarity Group, as well as a special program for dementia caused by Alzheimer's disease. The center also provides assistance including health advice and physical and recreational activities to elderly members of the community.

- Taciano Campos Laboratory

The Taciano Campos Laboratory performed 967,000 tests in 2005, all on a public care basis through SUS (United Health System). The laboratory has been awarded the Gold Award Certificate of the Brazilian Society of Clinical Analysis which is granted to laboratories that have received a rating of "excellent" for monthly audits performed over a ten-year period.

- Research Support Nucleus

CPEC's objectives relate specifically to research on social pathologies and focus on improving therapies, diagnosis and prevention of prevailing diseases which affect the needy. The advanced technical level of CPEC has helped make it one of the world's leading centers for the research and development of vaccines which target the prevention of cervical and prostate cancer. The center's excellence in research is reflected by strong partnerships with the Osvaldo Cruz Foundation (Fiocruz) and Cornell University and the University of California, Berkeley in the United States, as well as countless publications of papers in Brazilian and international scientific journals. At the present time, CPEC is concentrating its efforts on the research programs including: bacterial resistance to antibiotics, virus HTLV II infection, Helicobacter Pylori infections, prevention and control of visceral leishmaniasis, a vaccine to prevent HPV/cervical cancer, urinary tract infections from escherichia coli, epidemiology of masculine aging, and a vaccine to prevent prostate cancer.

- Sister Dulce's Memorial

OSID's Memorial, its 14th Nuclei, preserves the history of Sister Dulce's life and institutional history. Documents and photos, which trace the path followed by the one called the Mother of the Poor and the Good Angel of Bahia, are filed in the nucleus. Sister Dulce's Memorial houses approximately three thousand testimonies of the graces that were obtained. The investment in its perpetuation has as its pillar the Sister's canonization process, which started in January 2000 with the aim of having the Catholic Church acknowledge the virtues and the tireless determination of one of God's Servants who dedicated her life to the needy. Presently, the process, whose postulator is an Italian Friar, Paolo Lombardo, is following the procedural steps from the Congregation to the Cause of Saints in the Vatican. With the presentation of the Positio, a canonic law text that summarizes the process and the history of the virtues and the possible miracle already identified by the Vatican, the beatification is getting closer. As part of the work in favor of this cause, OSID has invested in the dissemination of Sister Dulce's life, launching a book of thoughts and her biography, as well as the construction of the Church of Our Lady of the Conception of God's mother. As a symbol of Sister Dulce's legacy of action and faith, the church building complies with the Vatican's recommendation as reinforcement to the beatification process and gives more institutional feasibility to OSID.

- Professor Adib Jatene Learning and Research Center (CEPPAJ)

Started in the 1970s, the work of the Medical Education OSID, consolidated from the 1990s, has residencies in the specialties of Internal Medicine, General Surgery, Maxillofacial Surgery, Anesthesiology, Obstetrics and Gynecology, Pediatric Surgery, Geriatrics, Pediatrics, Pediatric Intensive Care, Urology, Pediatrics Hematologic, Head and Neck Surgery and Boarding school in the specialties of Gynecology, Pediatrics, Internal Medicine and General Surgery.

The faculty is composed of preceptors, masters and doctors, serving approximately 500 residents and interns from Brazil and abroad. Students have, in addition to hospital structure, with a unique space for lectures and seminars and lectures, the Center for Teaching and Research Professor Adib Jatene (CEPPAJ).
