= Cowley Beach, Queensland =

Cowley Beach
- Town
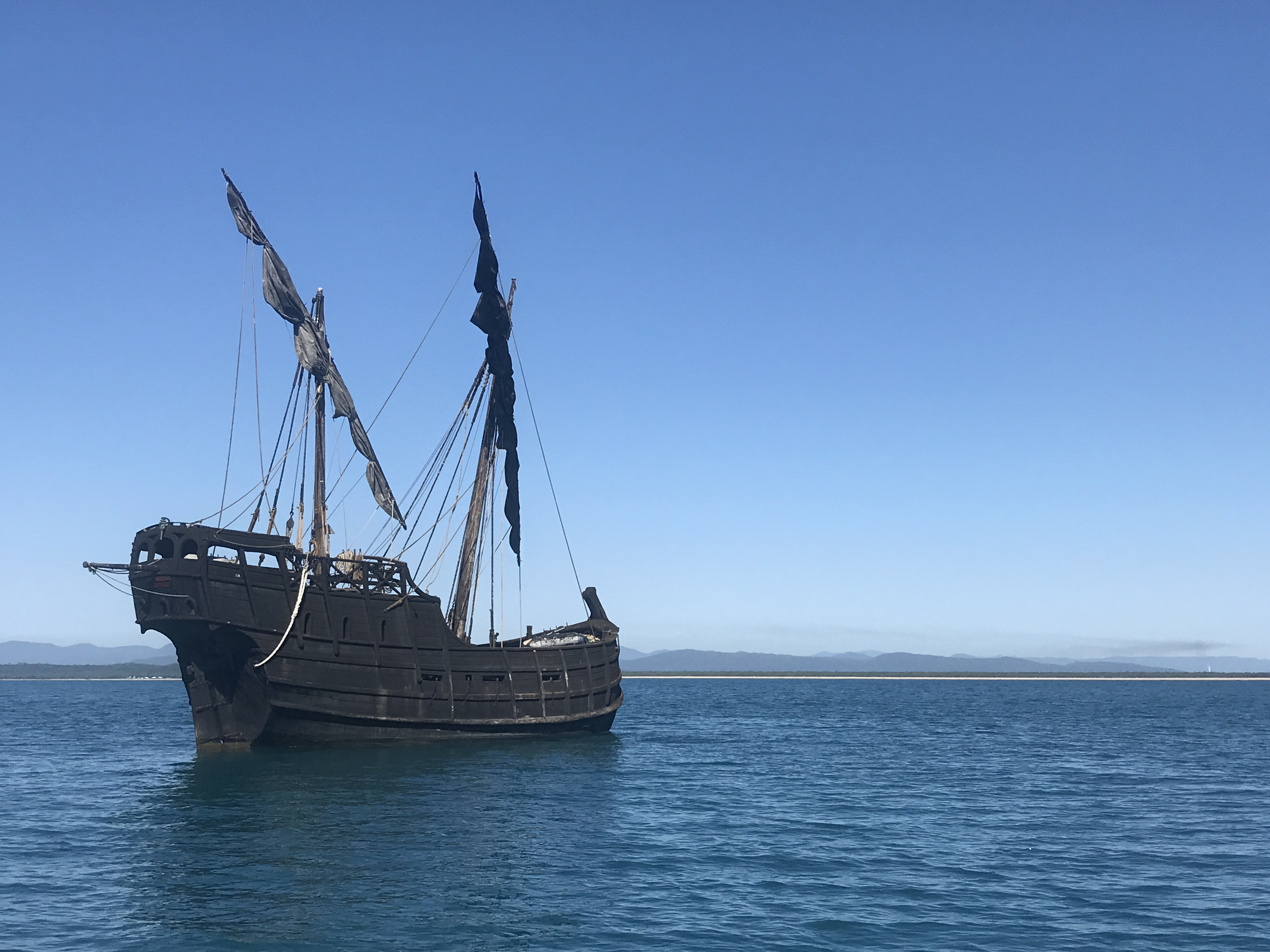
- The "Notorious" anchored near Hutchison Island off Cowley Beach, 2017

- Interactive map of Cowley Beach
- Coordinates: 17.6933°S 146.1113°E
- Country: Australia
- State: Queensland
- LGA: Cassowary Coast Region
- Location: 15.1 km (9.4 mi) NE of Silkwood; 29.6 km (18.4 mi) SSE of Innisfail; 117 km (73 mi) SSE of Cairns; 1,577 km (980 mi) NNE of Brisbane

Government
  - State electorate: Hill
  - Federal division: Kennedy

Area
  - Total: 144.0 km^{2} (55.6 sq mi)

Population
  - Total: 65 (2021 census)
  - Density: 0.451/km^{2} (1.169/sq mi)
- Time zone: UTC+10:00 (AEST)
- Postcode: 4871
Localities around Cowley Beach
New Harbourline	Mourilyan Harbour	Coral Sea
Moresby	Cowley Beach	Coral Sea
Cowley; Lower Cowley	Kurrimine Beach	Coral Sea

Cowley Beach is a beach, coastal town and locality in the Cassowary Coast Region, Queensland, Australia. In the 2021 census, the locality of Cowley Beach had a population of 65 people.

== Geography ==
The locality of Cowley Beach is bounded to the north by the Moresby River, to the east by the Coral Sea, and to the south by Liverpool Creek.

The Australian Defence Force's Cowley Beach Military Training Area (17.690°S 146.113°E) occupies most of the locality includes the northern part of the beach and most of its hinterland as well as the nearby Lindquist Island. This facility is used for amphibious warfare training, and also includes a rocket range and a cantonment area.

Cowley Beach has the following mountains:

- Esmeralda Hill (17.6205°S 146.1311°E) 100 metres (330 ft)
- Georgie Hill (17.6054°S 146.1307°E) 140 metres (460 ft)

Cowley Beach has the following coastal headlands (from north to south):

- Camp Point (17.6017°S 146.1267°E)
- Hall Point (17.6018°S 146.1322°E)
- Hayter Point (17.6170°S 146.1366°E)
- Double Point (17.6487°S 146.1481°E)

Cowley Beach has the following beaches (from north to south):

- Robinsons Beach, south of Hayter Point (17.6213°S 146.1359°E)
- Browns Beach, north of Double Point (17.6379°S 146.1397°E)
- Cowley Beach, south of Double Point (17.6757°S 146.1225°E)

There are a number of offshore islands including (from north to south):

- Lindquist Island (17.6566°S 146.1594°E)
- Bresnahan Island (17.6670°S 146.1690°E)
- North Barnard Islands (17.6727°S 146.175°E), an island group named by Lieutenant Phillip Parker King of the HM Colonial Cutter Mermaid on 21 June 1819 after his friend Edward Barnard, consisting of:
  - Jessie Island (17.6735°S 146.1738°E)
  - Hutchison Island (17.6744°S 146.1691°E, named after Lieutenant (later Captain) Hutchison of the Royal navy who served on the survey vessels HMS Herald from 1856 to 1861 and HM Colonial Schooner Beatrice from 1862 to 1864
  - Kent Island (17.6764°S 146.1799°E), named after lightkeeper Kent

There are also islands in the Moresby River (from north to south):

- Bradshaw Island (17.6175°S 146.1219°E)
- Lily Island (17.6197°S 146.1161°E)
- Maizie Island (17.6280°S 146.1110°E)

== History ==
Double Point was named by James Cook on his 1770 exploration of the Australian eastern coast.

The town takes its name from the beach which in turn takes its name from Ebenezer Cowley, a horticulturist and overseer at Kamerunga State Nursery. Prior to 16 November 1991 the town was called Inarlinga.

In December 1930, a public reserve along the beachfront of Cowley Beach was established. In January 1931 the beach was attracting increasing numbers of holiday makers.

The Cowley Beach Military Training Area was established in 1962 as the Joint Tropical Research Unit, so-called because it operated in collaboration with the British Ministry of Defence.

== Demographics ==
In the 2016 census, the locality of Cowley Beach had a population of 78 people.

In the 2021 census, the locality of Cowley Beach had a population of 65 people.

== Education ==
There are no schools in Cowley Beach. The nearest government primary school is Silkwood State School in Silkwood to the south-west. The nearest government secondary school is Innisfail State College in Innisfail to the north.

== Amenities ==
There is a boat ramp in Bambarook Road (17.6965°S 146.1122°E). It is managed by the Cassowary Coast Regional Council.

== Attractions ==
Cowley Beach is a 7.5-kilometre-long (4.7 mi) beach that extends from Double Point past the town down to the mouth of Liverpool Creek.
