= Silkwood, Queensland =

Silkwood
- Town
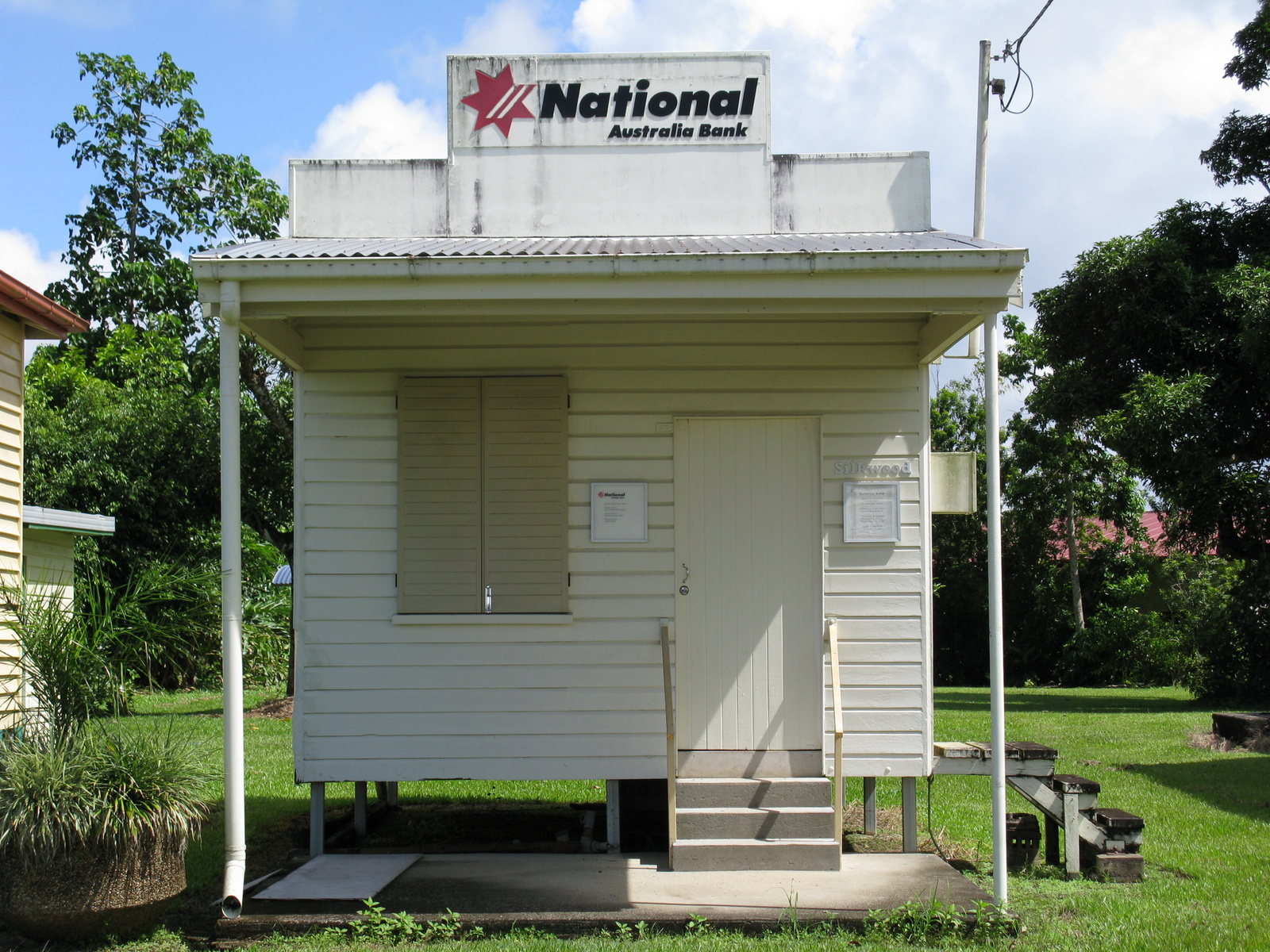
- National Australia Bank building, Silkwood, 2008

- Interactive map of Silkwood
- Coordinates: 17.7458°S 146.0208°E
- Country: Australia
- State: Queensland
- LGA: Cassowary Coast Region
- Location: 26.1 km (16.2 mi) NNE of Tully; 29.1 km (18.1 mi) S of Innsifail; 116 km (72 mi) S of Cairns; 232 km (144 mi) NNW of Townsville; 1,582 km (983 mi) NNW of Brisbane

Government
  - State electorate: Hill
  - Federal division: Kennedy

Area
  - Total: 22.8 km^{2} (8.8 sq mi)

Population
  - Total: 407 (2021 census)
  - Density: 17.85/km^{2} (46.23/sq mi)
- Time zone: UTC+10:00 (AEST)
- Postcode: 4856
Localities around Silkwood
No 5 Branch	Goolboo	McCutcheon
Walter Lever Estate	Silkwood	Kurrimine Beach
No 4 Branch	Jaffa	Daveson

Silkwood is a rural town and locality in the Cassowary Coast Region, Queensland, Australia. In the 2021 census, the locality of Silkwood had a population of 407 people.

== Geography ==
Silkwood is situated on the Bruce Highway roughly halfway between Tully and Innisfail.

The locality is flat land about 10 metres above sea level and is predominantly freehold land used for farming, particularly the cultivation of sugarcane. The north-western border of the locality is Liverpool Creek, which flows eastward to the Coral Sea. The town is roughly central in the locality with the Bruce Highway passing from south to north just east of the town, while the North Coast railway line also passes from south to north through the town, which is serviced by the Silkwood railway station.

== History ==
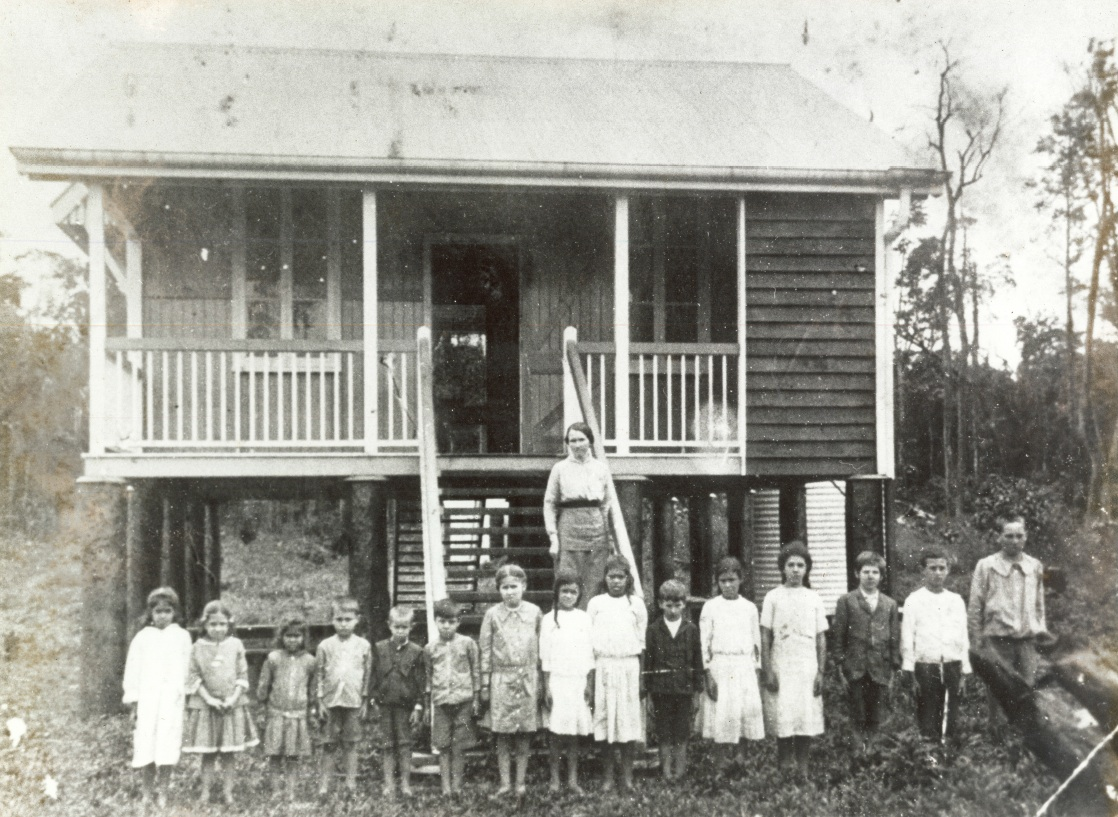
Early school building, Silkwood State School

The town takes its name from the name of the house of A. J. Daveson, and refers to a local timber.

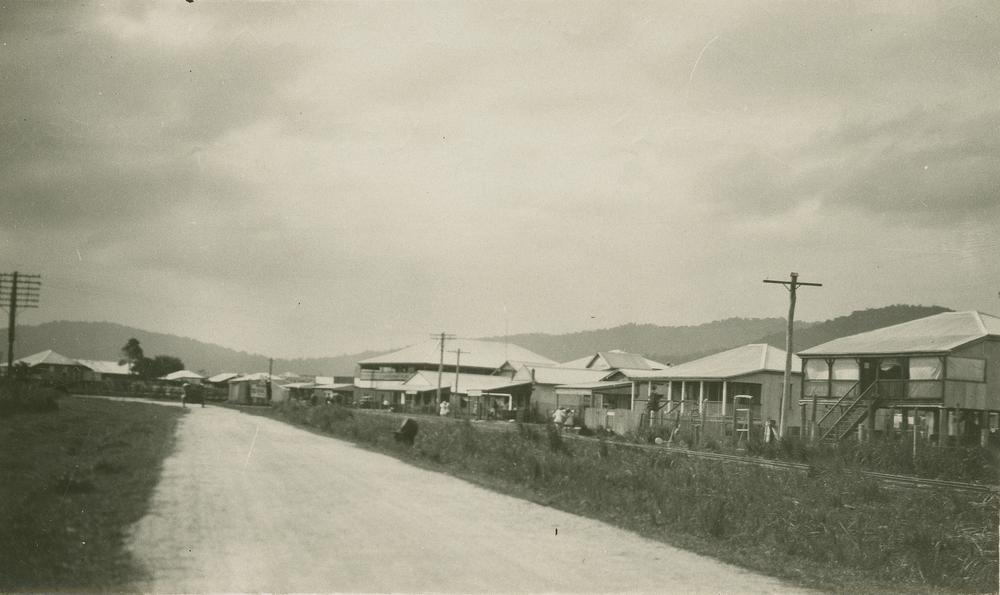
Silkwood, circa 1930

Silkwood State School opened on 28 August 1916 with 11 students under head teacher Miss Hannah Hogan. By December 1916, there were 24 students. On 10 March 1918, many buildings in the town including the school were destroyed in a cyclone. Classes resumed on 16 September 1918 in a private home taught by Mr Kreuger. The rebuilding of the school was delayed by disagreements over rebuilding on the same site or moving to a new site. On 30 August 1920, a new school building was opened at the new location, but it was already too small as the school now had 66 students and additions to the building were immediately needed but were not completed until 4 July 1923. A teacher's residence was built in 1924. As student numbers continued to grow, a new school building on a new site was being considered in 1946, but the opening of a local Catholic primary school reduced the student numbers in the state school and the new building was no longer needed. In the 1970s, a new school building was constructed with the addition of a pre-school.

Silkwood was the site of significant Italian immigration in the 1940s.

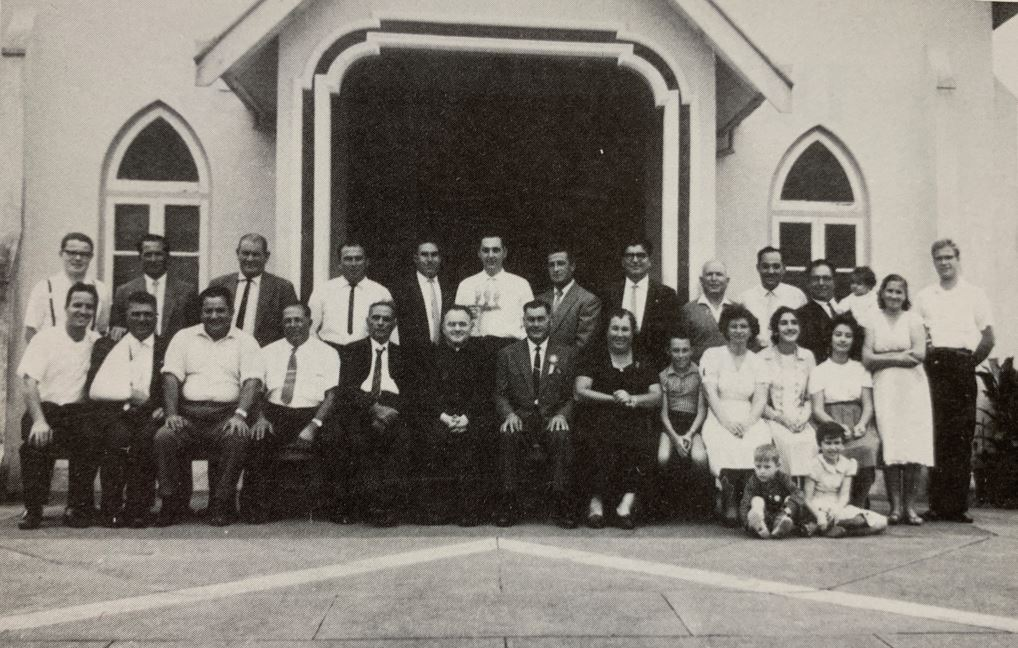
Catholic church in Silkwood, 1950

On Sunday 15 December 1940, Roman Catholic Bishop of Cairns, John Heavey, laid the foundation stone for a church to be dedicated to St John the Evangelist. He returned on Sunday 3 August 1941 to perform the blessing and opening of the Gothic-style church. The early priests at the church were Scalabrinians, followed by Augustinian priests. The Silkwood parish was established in 1946.

St John's Catholic School was founded by the parish priest Father Alfred Natali and the Missionary Franciscan Sisters. It opened on 2 February 1948 with students mostly from Italian families who worked in the local sugarcane industry. The Sisters left the school in 1987, being replaced by lay teachers.

== Demographics ==
In the 2016 census, the locality of Silkwood had a population of 391 people.

In the 2021 census, the locality of Silkwood had a population of 407 people.

== Education ==
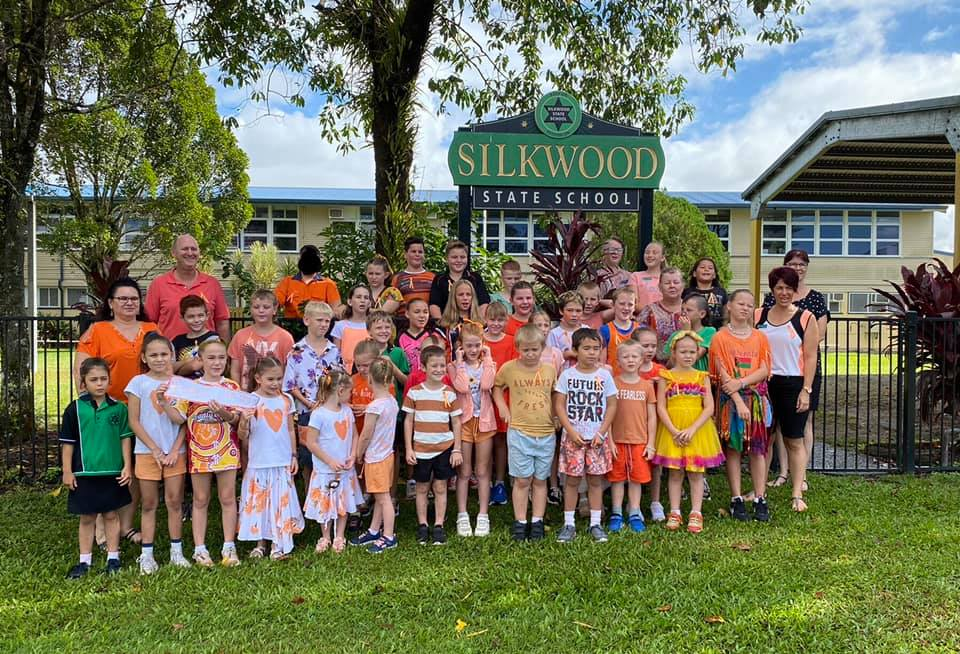
Silkwood State School, 2022

Silkwood State School is a government primary (Prep-6) school for boys and girls at Japoon Road (17.7364°S 146.0007°E). In 2015, the school had an enrolment of 60 students with 7 teachers (4 full-time equivalent) and 6 non-teaching staff (4 full-time equivalent) with the students divided into 3 classes, years P-2, 3-4, and 5-6. In 2018, the school had an enrolment of 62 students with 6 teachers (4 full-time equivalent) and 7 non-teaching staff (4 full-time equivalent).

St John's School is a Catholic primary (Prep-6) school for boys and girls at Harold Street (17.7372°S 146.0051°E). It is operated by the Roman Catholic Diocese of Cairns. In 2016, the school had 64 students with 8 teachers (7 full-time equivalent) and 8 non-teaching staff (3 full-time equivalent). In 2018, the school had an enrolment of 67 students with 9 teachers (7 full-time equivalent) and 8 non-teaching staff (4 full-time equivalent).

The nearest government secondary schools are Tully State High School in Tully to the south-west and Innisfail State College in Innisfail Estate to the north.

== Amenities ==
The Silkwood branch of the Queensland Country Women's Association meets at 9 Silkwood Jappon Road (17.74577°S 146.01937°E).

St John the Evangelist Catholic Church is in Harold Street (17.73757°S 146.00536°E). It is within the Silkwood Parish of the Roman Catholic Diocese of Cairns.

The Silkwood Lawn Bowls Club is at 185 Silkwood Japoon Road (17.74139°S 146.01280°E).

The Silkwood Clay Target Club is on Silkwood Japoon Road (17.7476°S 146.0258°E).

== Facilities ==
Silkwood has the following emergency services:

- Silkwood Police Station, 1A Silkwood Japoon Road (17.7466°S 146.0220°E)
- Silkwood SES Facility, Margaret Street (17.7456°S 146.0243°E)
- Silkwood Ambulance Station, 187 Silkwood Japoon Road (17.7411°S 146.0123°E)

== Attractions ==
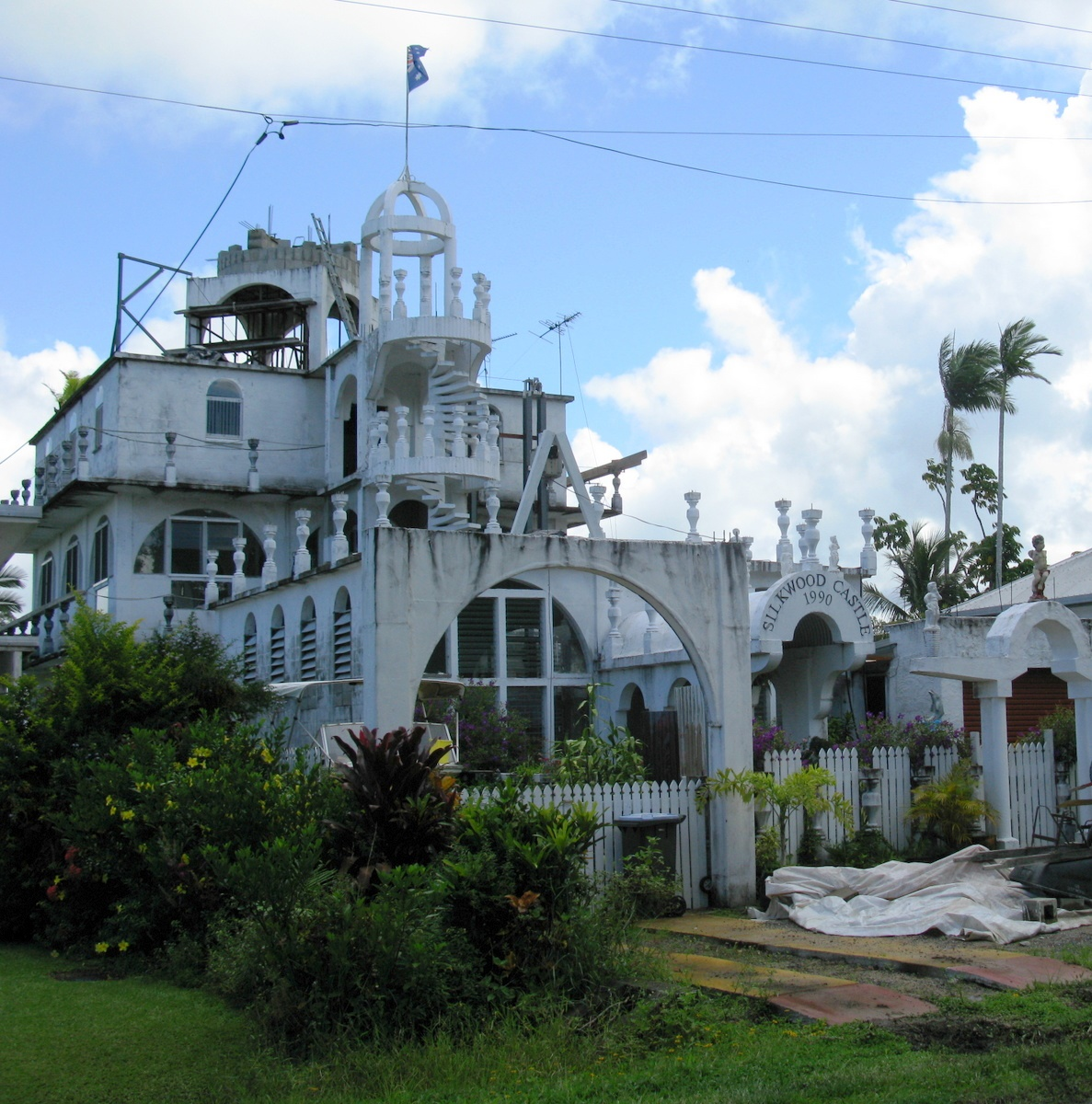
Silkwood Castle, 2008

Silkwood Castle is at 18 Margaret Street (17.74591°S 146.02375°E). Engineer John Nielsen retired to Silkwood and, in 2009, commenced building himself a home. It was an imposing whitewashed concrete structure, intended to be something different, which has been described variously looking like a "Disney fairytale" and a "mosque". He worked on it for many years until his death.

The former National Australia Bank building in Silkwood is claimed to be the smallest bank building in Australia. It was opened in the 1930s and continued to trade until 1999. It is now a small museum.

== Events ==
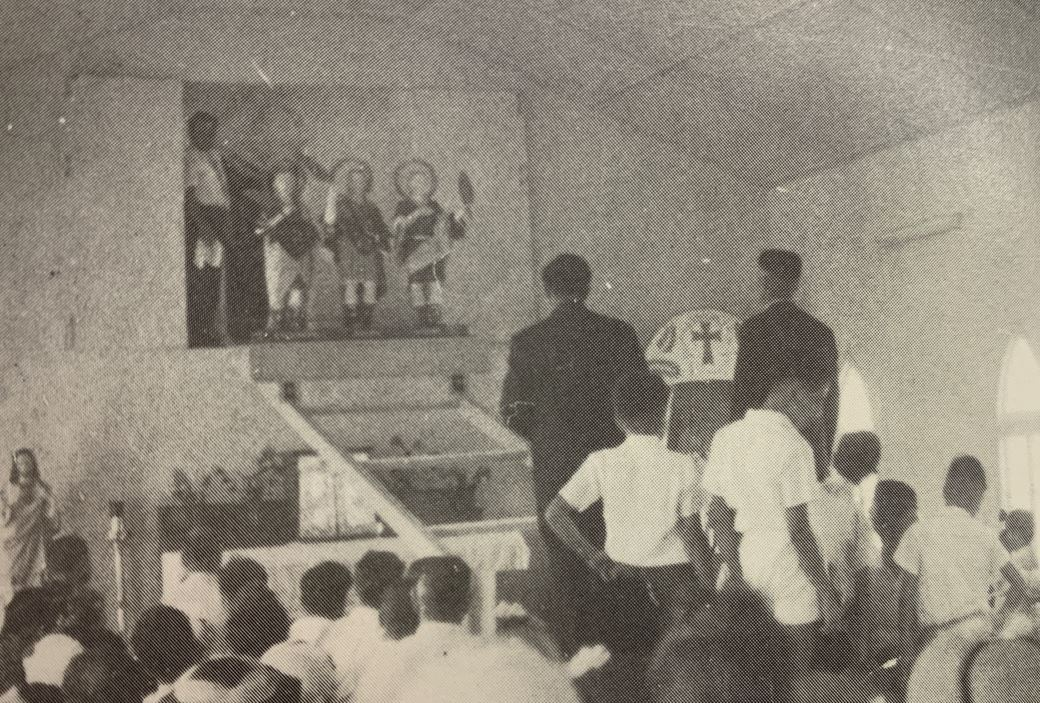
Statue of the Three Saints in the church, Silkwood, 1951

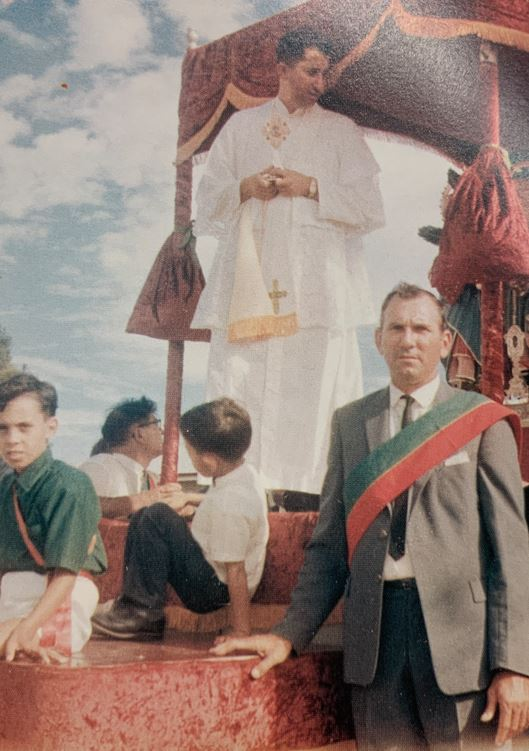
Procession of the Three Saints through the streets of Silkwood, 1951

On the first Sunday of May, Silkwood celebrates the annual Feast of the Three Saints: St Alfio, St Filadelfo and St Cirino. In 1939, Silkwood resident Alfia Tornabene (née Patti) had just given birth to a daughter in Innisfail Hospital, becoming seriously ill. Her husband Rosario dreamt of the three saints who reassured him his wife would recover, leading Rosario to vow that he would bring statues of the saints from Sicily to Silkwood if his wife recovered. His wife recovered and in 1947-1948 he organised for an old artisan in Giarre, Sicily, to carve the statues from cherry trees near his family's farm in Sicily as recreations of the statues in the main church of Sant'Alfio in Sicily. The first celebration of the feast in Silkwood was in 1950. The festival typically consists of a Mass, a procession of the statues through the streets accompanied by bands, feasting, music, dancing and fireworks.

On 4 May 2025, the community will celebrate the 75th anniversary of the annual festival.
