= Barron Gorge, Queensland =

Barron Gorge
- Suburb
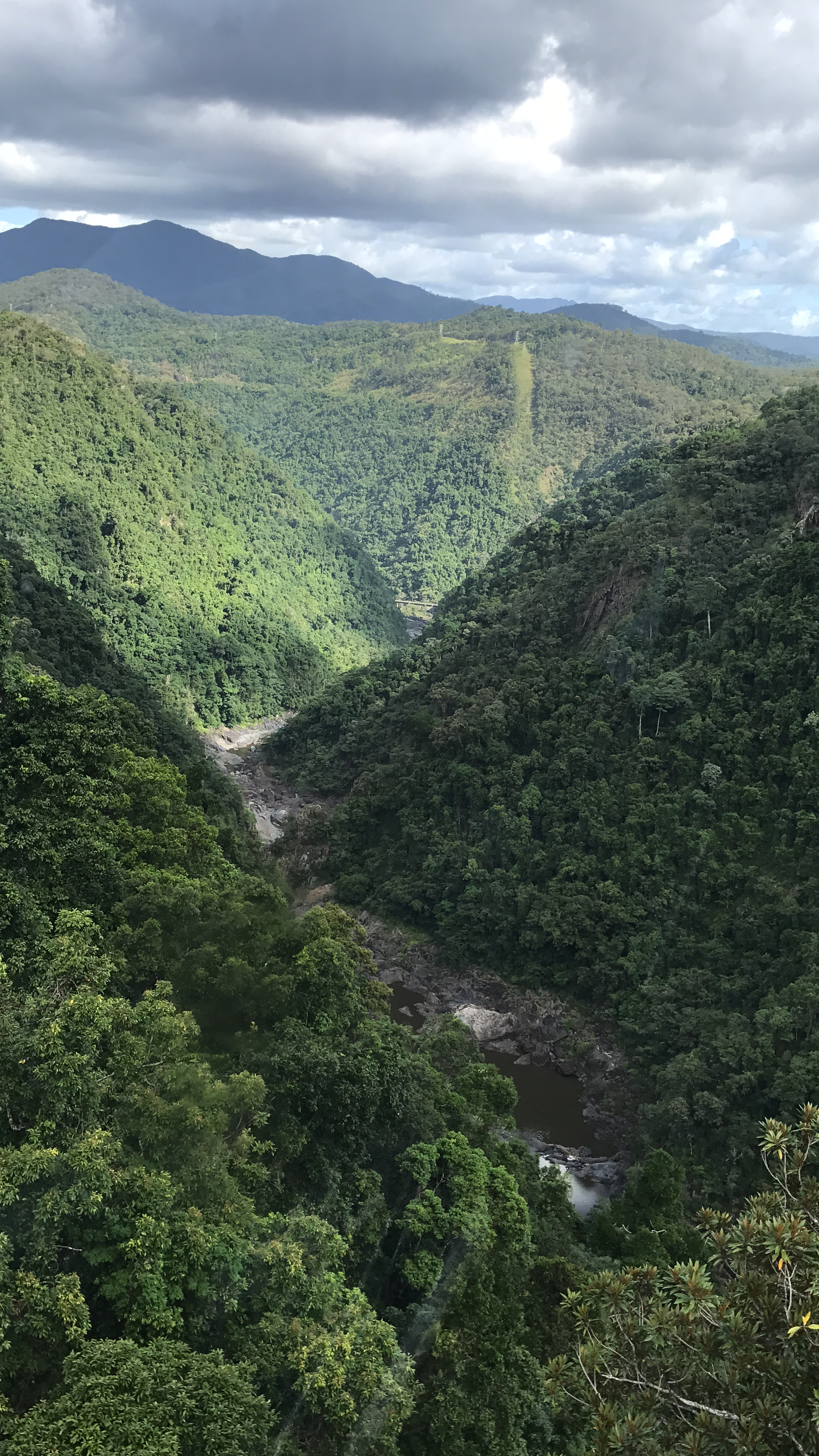
- Barron Gorge, 2017

- Interactive map of Barron Gorge
- Coordinates: 16.8816°S 145.6644°E
- Country: Australia
- State: Queensland
- LGA: Cairns Region
- Location: 18.4 km (11.4 mi) NW of Cairns CBD; 23.4 km (14.5 mi) SE of Kuranda; 1,690 km (1,050 mi) NNW of Brisbane

Government
  - State electorate: Barron River
  - Federal division: Leichhardt

Area
  - Total: 13.3 km^{2} (5.1 sq mi)

Population
  - Total: 0 (2021 census)
  - Density: 0.00/km^{2} (0.00/sq mi)
- Time zone: UTC+10:00 (AEST)
- Postcode: 4870
Suburbs around Barron Gorge
Kuranda	Macalister Range	Caravonica
Speewah	Barron Gorge	Kamerunga
Koah	Lamb Range	Redlynch

Barron Gorge is a rural locality in the Cairns Region, Queensland, Australia. In the 2021 census, Barron Gorge had "no people or a very low population".

Springs is a neighbourhood in the narrow centre part of the locality (16.8666°S 145.6666°E).

== Geography ==
Almost the entire area of the locality is undeveloped land within the Barron Gorge National Park which also extends into a number of neighbouring localities. The land rises from approximately 10 metres above sea level to the east of the locality up to a number of named peaks, including:

- Red Peak, 590 metres (1,940 ft) above sea level in the north of the locality (16.8505°S 145.6722°E).
- North Peak, 730 metres (2,400 ft) in the middle of the locality (16.8941°S 145.6736°E)
- Mount Williams, also known as Tokim Peak, 1,010 metres (3,310 ft) in the south of the locality (16.9133°S 145.6633°E)
- Red Bluff, a cliff (16.8666°S 145.6666°E)

The name of the locality derives from the gorge created by the Barron River through the Macalister Range and the Lamb Range.

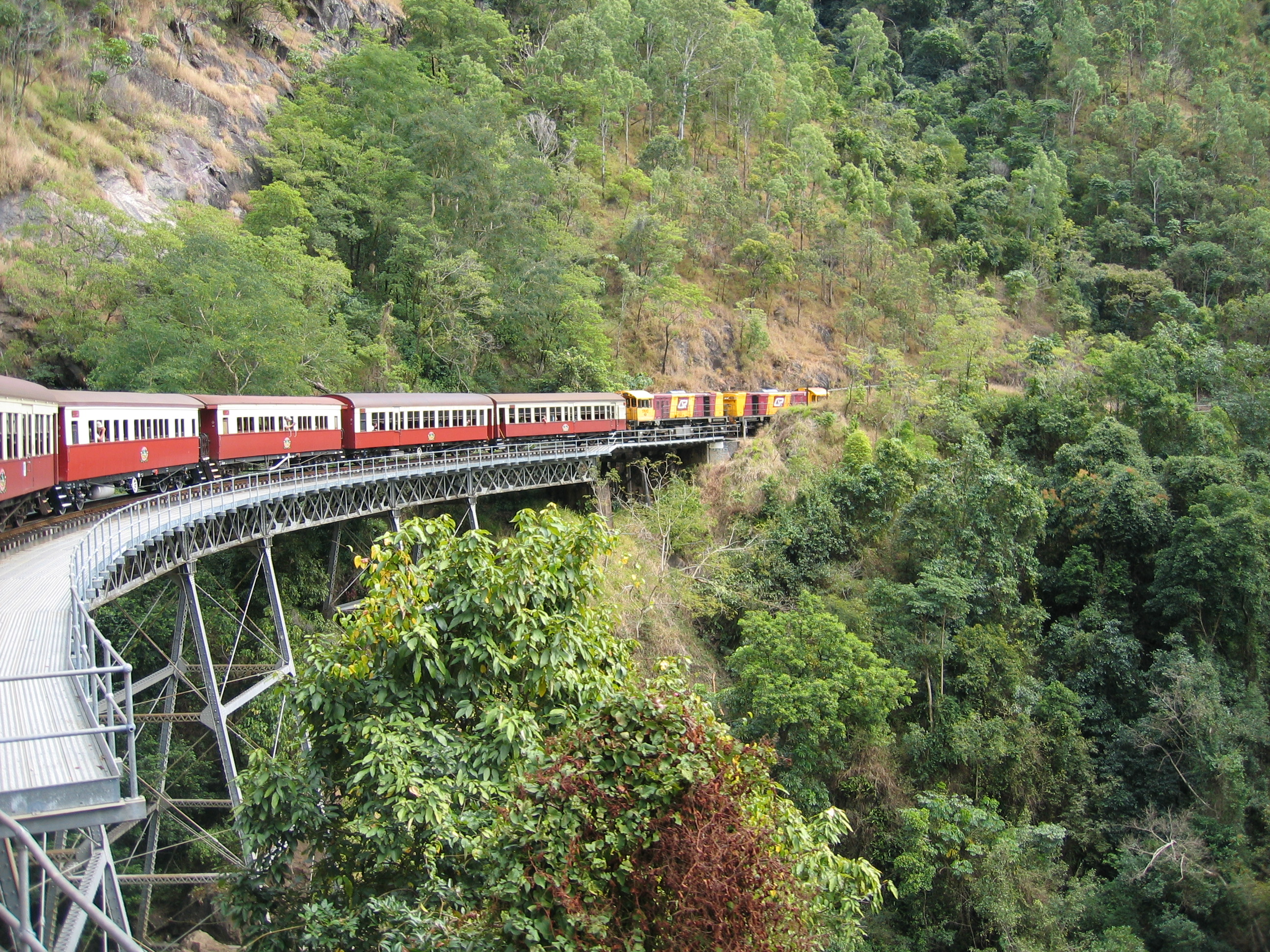
Kuranda Scenic Railway tourist train, 2004

The Cairns-to-Kuranda railway line provides the north-western boundary of the locality and also part of the south-eastern locality. The railway line is used by the Kuranda Scenic Railway tourist service which includes stops at scenic lookouts. There were two railway stations on this line within the locality:

- Springs railway station, now abandoned (16.8695°S 145.6650°E).
- Stoney Creek railway station (16.8801°S 145.6533°E), situated where the railway line crosses Stoney Creek (16.8651°S 145.6677°E), a tributary of the Barron River

There is only one road through the locality, the Barron Gorge Road, which starts in Carvonica and Kamerunga and provides access to the Barron Gorge Hydroelectric Power Station.

== Demographics ==
In the 2016 census Barron Gorge had "no people or a very low population".

In the 2021 census, Barron Gorge had "no people or a very low population".

== Education ==
There are no schools in Barron Gorge. The nearest government primary schools are Caravonica State School in neighbouring Caravonica to the north-east and Redlynch State College in neighbouring Redlynch to the south-east. The nearest government secondary school is Redlynch State College.

== Attractions ==
The Skyrail Rainforest Cableway passes through the locality with Red Peak Station (16.8493°S 145.6695°E), a stopping point within the locality which features guided boardwalk tours through ancient tropical rainforests, featuring a 400-year-old kauri pine tree. There is no entry to the cableway from the locality; its terminals are in Smithfield and Kuranda.
