= Kuranda Range =

Kuranda Range may refer to:

- An informal name for the Macalister Range between Cairns and Kuranda
- Kuranda Range road, a section of highway that traverses this range
- Kuranda Scenic Railway, a scenic tourist rail service that traverses this range
