= Smithfield township, Queensland =

Old Smithfield township
- Town
- MacDonald Street, Old Smithfield

- Coordinates: 16.8607°S 145.7005°E
- Country: Australia
- State: Queensland
- LGA: Cairns Region
- Location: 15.1 km (9.4 mi) NNW of Cairns CBD; 359 km (223 mi) N of Townsville; 1,694 km (1,053 mi) NNW of Brisbane
- Established: 22 November 1876

Government
  - State electorate: Barron River
  - Federal division: Leichhardt
- Time zone: UTC+10:00 (AEST)
- Postcode: 4878

Smithfield township (1876–1879) was a short-lived colonial river port and supply settlement on the northern bank of the Barron River, approximately 15 kilometres (9.3 mi) northwest of present-day Cairns, Queensland, Australia. Surveyed in November 1876 by government surveyor Frederick Horatio Warner and gazetted on 15 December of that year, the township served as a provisioning centre for packers and carriers travelling to the recently discovered Hodgkinson goldfield. It was named by Mining Warden Howard St. George in honour of William "Old Bill" Smith, a prospector and beche-de-mer fisherman who had blazed a track from Trinity Bay across the Lamb Range to the goldfield earlier that year. Situated in the traditional lands of the Yirrganydji people, Smithfield grew rapidly during 1877—supporting a post office, police station, hotels, stores, a horse-drawn tramway, and Chinese-run market gardens—and at its peak briefly rivalled Cairns in both population and commercial importance. The township's prosperity was short-lived: as trade shifted to Port Douglas throughout 1878, businesses departed, and by early 1879 the settlement was largely abandoned, a decline hastened by severe flooding associated with a tropical cyclone in March of that year. Today the township site, at the end of Redford Road in the suburb of Caravonica, is occupied by sugar-cane fields and sand-extraction operations; the Old Smithfield Cemetery is the only surviving remnant of the original settlement.

== Background ==
The Hodgkinson River goldfield was discovered in September 1874 by James Venture Mulligan, triggering a gold rush that drew some 2,000 miners to the field by 1876. The principal settlement on the field, Thornborough, lay approximately 280 kilometres (170 mi) by road from Cooktown and 210 kilometres (130 mi) from Cardwell—journeys that could take wagon teams several months to complete, with freight costs described as exorbitant. As the advancing dry season diminished water and feed for animals along existing routes, miners grew increasingly anxious to find a shorter path to the coast.

In early October 1876, William "Bill" Smith—a beche-de-mer fisherman and prospector working around Trinity Bay—successfully cut a track from the bay across the Lamb Range to the Hodgkinson goldfield. Around the same time, Sub-Inspector Alexander Douglas-Douglas blazed a separate route down the southern side of the range. Around the same time, Sub-Inspector Alexander Douglas-Douglas blazed a separate route down the southern side of the range. The discovery of these two tracks—known as Smith's Track and the Douglas Track—made a coastal port at Trinity Bay viable for the first time, and the port of Cairns was declared in October 1876.

By early October, approximately 400 people had gathered at Trinity Bay in two separate encampments: one with Douglas on Trouton Esplanade and the other with Smith at Smith's Creek, both awaiting the arrival of a government surveyor to formalise a settlement. The coastal site, however, proved inhospitable: tea-tree swamps and sand dunes offered poor grazing for the packers' horses, and many preferred the open forest country at the foot of the Lamb Range near the Barron River, where fresh water and feed were abundant.

== Establishment ==
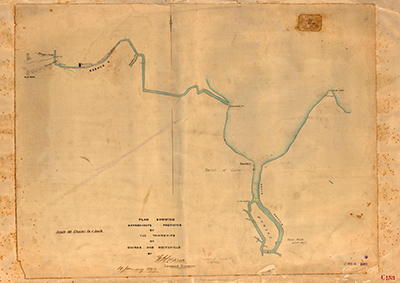
Plan showing the approximate positions of Cairns and Smithfield, surveyed by F. H. Warner, 10 January 1877.

A rudimentary packers' camp of 30 to 40 dwellings formed at Kamerunga on the Barron River, at the point where the Douglas and Smith Tracks crossed the river. Among those who relocated from Cairns was Bill Smith himself, and the camp—initially known as Smith's Camp—soon acquired a store, a grog shop, a blacksmith, and numerous packers' camps.

Government surveyor John Sharkey visited Smith's Camp on 9 November 1876 but could see no benefit in establishing a second township so close to Cairns, and he was recalled to finish work in Townsville. His replacement, Frederick Horatio Warner, held a different view and on 22 November 1876 travelled up the Barron to survey a township. Charles Hugh Macdonald, the northern inspector of roads, guided Warner to a site in dense rainforest on the northern bank of the river, where the land rose approximately 20 feet (6.1 m) above the waterline—a feature that appeared to offer natural flood protection.

Within three days, Warner had laid out five streets and two town blocks, each containing 20 allotments of 36 perches (910 m^{2}), with street frontages of 66 feet (20 m). The two principal thoroughfares—Macdonald Street (named after the road overseer) and Logan Street—were 33 yards (30 m) wide and ran northwest for 550 yards (500 m) from the river. Two cross streets, Hill Street (named after the Government Botanist) and Seymour Street (named after the Police Commissioner), completed the grid, with the Esplanade reserved as a two-chain riverfront reserve. Mining Warden Howard St. George visited the site and christened the new township "Smithfield" in honour of Bill Smith's role in opening the track to the coast. Alternative names including "Smithville" and "Smithton" were suggested but rejected. The township was officially gazetted on 15 December 1876, and the first land sales—comprising 34 town allotments—were held at the Cairns police station on 15 February 1877.

== Growth and development ==
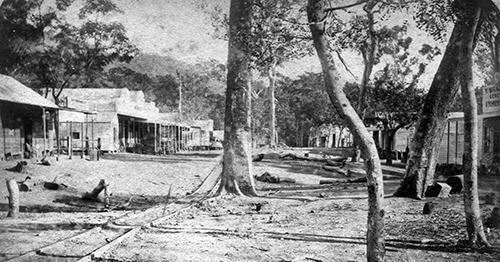
Smithfield township, c.1877

=== Businesses and services ===
Following the first land sales, business premises were erected rapidly as clearings were made in the forest. During the first half of 1877, Smithfield's population grew until it rivalled that of Cairns. The township supported a post office, police station, auction house, bakery, butcher, blacksmith, farrier, saddlery store, canvas and tent-maker, drapery, restaurant, numerous stores and hotels, a billiard room, and fruit and vegetable shops operated by Chinese market gardeners. Among the earliest commercial establishments were Collinson & Mackay butchers on Logan Street, opened by William Hunter Collinson and his Cairns business partner George Mackay; the warehouses of Craig & Co. and Edward John Nolan & Co.; and the Pioneer Hotel, operated by Bill Smith on Macdonald Street. Contemporary newspaper reports noted that by November 1876 the population of Smithfield had reached approximately 150 and was growing rapidly, with eleven stores and hotels established within a year.

=== River trade and infrastructure ===
The road from Smithfield to Cairns was soft and sandy, passing through numerous swampy sections, which deterred packers from making the journey to the coastal port. Instead, cargo unloaded from ships at the Cairns wharves was trans-shipped into smaller paddle-steamers—principally the P.S. Louisa and the P.S. Fitzroy, operated by William Bairstow Ingham—which could carry approximately 20 tons each and navigate the shallow sand-bars of the Barron. Two wharves were constructed on the high sandy bank at Smithfield, and the receiving stores of Craig & Co. and Nolan & Co. were erected nearby to warehouse goods brought upriver. Harris Hynes Solomon built a wooden tramway along Macdonald Street, enabling goods to be transported by horse-wagon from the wharves to the township's businesses. James Sparge was appointed tramway proprietor and reportedly moved 30 to 40 tons of goods per day along the line.

=== West Smithfield ===
Another route over the Lamb Range, discovered and developed by road engineer Archibald Campbell Macmillan, became known as Macmillan's Track. Macdonald's road crew began converting it into a dray road, which passed close to the original township along what is now the Brinsmead–Kamerunga Road at Caravonica. The track opened to wheeled vehicles on 16 August 1877, and a telegraph line was constructed alongside it from Cairns through Smithfield to Thornborough. As packers began favouring Macmillan's Track, several businesses relocated to service passing traffic, and a secondary settlement developed at Smithfield No. 2, near where Caravonica State School now stands. This area, known as West Smithfield, supported Clifton & Aplin's store (described as one of the largest in northern Queensland), Kennedy & de Fraine's store, the Golden Age Hotel, the Victorian Hotel, and Frith's Hotel. Warner was instructed to lay out a second town at West Smithfield, comprising an additional 79 allotments along the dray road. The rapid growth of Smithfield caused concern in Cairns. Some observers referred to the river township as "the new city on the Barron", and Cairns residents feared that freight would bypass their town entirely, being offloaded directly into light-draught steamers for conveyance to Smithfield.

=== Additional land sales ===
The success of the first land sales prompted the government to send surveyor Arthur Chamberlin to lay out an additional street and a further 40 allotments. These were offered for sale on 29 May 1877.

== Bill Smith murder-suicide ==
Smithfield was the site of a notable murder-suicide on Boxing Day (26 December) 1877, involving the man after whom the township was named. Bill Smith, who operated the Pioneer Hotel on Macdonald Street, was heavily in debt to several storekeepers and merchants. On the day of the township's race meeting, Smith operated a booth at the racecourse but soon ran out of stock. Robert Jackson Craig of Craig & Co. refused to extend Smith's credit. Smith returned to his hotel and began drinking. Later that afternoon, he approached Craig in his store and asked him to come to the hotel, saying he would "settle with him". Craig, assuming Smith intended to pay his debts, accompanied him. Upon arrival, Smith produced a revolver and fired twice, striking Craig once in the chest. Craig fled outside; Smith fired twice more. Craig managed to stagger to his store, where he collapsed and died. Smith then turned the revolver on himself, shooting himself once in the chest. He died on the verandah of his hotel. The following day, Cairns police magistrate William Matthew Mowbray held an inquest (Queensland State Archives Item ID 2724309), finding that Smith had murdered Craig and then committed suicide, though he could not establish a motive. Craig—a well-respected businessman—was buried in the McLeod Street Pioneer Cemetery in Cairns, while Smith was interred in an unmarked grave outside the township boundary.

== Decline ==
Smithfield remained an important packers' town through the early months of 1878, but its decline began with the discovery of an easier route to the coast by explorer Christie Palmerston. Palmerston's track reached the coast north of Cairns near the Mowbray River, where the settlement of Port Douglas was established. Several hundred people relocated to the new track and began clearing Palmerston's Bump Track to make it suitable for wagons. Throughout 1878, both Cairns and Smithfield declined as businesses relocated to Port Douglas. By the end of the year, only a handful of businesses remained trading at Smithfield, and the government road crew was instructed to cease maintaining Macmillan's dray road and instead concentrate their efforts on the Bump Track at Port Douglas. Over £9,000 had been spent constructing Macmillan's government dray road, but its steep pinches had proven difficult for bullock wagons to negotiate, further diminishing the route's viability.

== Abandonment ==
Smithfield township was abandoned in early 1879, and the site quickly became overgrown with vegetation. In 1880, a grass fire destroyed several of the remaining buildings. Several former residents stayed in the surrounding area, taking up farming—growing maize or breeding pack-donkeys—while the paddle-steamers that had once hauled goods to the township began carrying rafts of red cedar logs down the river.

=== Flooding ===
Several twentieth-century authors claimed that Smithfield township was destroyed by a catastrophic flood on the Barron River during the wet season, a narrative popularised by Clem Lack's 1971 article "The town that was drowned" and subsequently repeated in numerous secondary works. Research by historians at James Cook University has demonstrated that this account is inaccurate: the original township, situated on its 20-foot-high bank, was not itself inundated during any flood event. Smithfield experienced heavy rain and flooding in its first wet season in early 1877, which isolated the township but did not cause inundation. The following wet season, a Category 3 or Severe Category 4 tropical cyclone crossed the coast, causing significant damage to both Cairns and Smithfield, though again the township itself was not flooded. By March 1879, Smithfield township was virtually abandoned, but businesses at West Smithfield—situated along Macmillan's Track—were still trading. At the end of March, the Barron River broke its banks above Smithfield and followed a series of natural lagoons east of the Cairns–Thornborough Road, creating a distributary channel that flooded West Smithfield to a depth of approximately 12 feet (3.7 m). Frith's Hotel was washed into the side of Clifton & Aplin's store, which filled with five or six feet of water before being washed off its stumps. All stock was destroyed; bottles washed from the store were found years later near Avondale Creek and at the head of Richters Creek, indicating the path taken by the floodwaters. The abandoned buildings in the original Smithfield township suffered no flood damage.

== Aftermath ==
Following the township's abandonment, the area around the Barron became a quiet rural backwater for several decades. The land was used occasionally for grazing cattle, and was rarely visited for approximately 40 years. Activity resumed in 1887 with the commencement of construction on the second section of the Cairns to Kuranda railway from Redlynch. In 1923, Sybil Orger Reed purchased a lease over part of the former township site and planted sugar cane. The remaining township leases were purchased in 1926 by Thomas Bannister Moore, who also planted cane. Sugar cane has been grown on the site for nearly a century since. The township leases are now held by Pioneer North Queensland Pty. Ltd., which holds a licence to excavate the site as part of its Barron Sands sand-extraction business. As of 2018, the township site was sub-leased as a cane farm.

=== Old Smithfield Cemetery ===
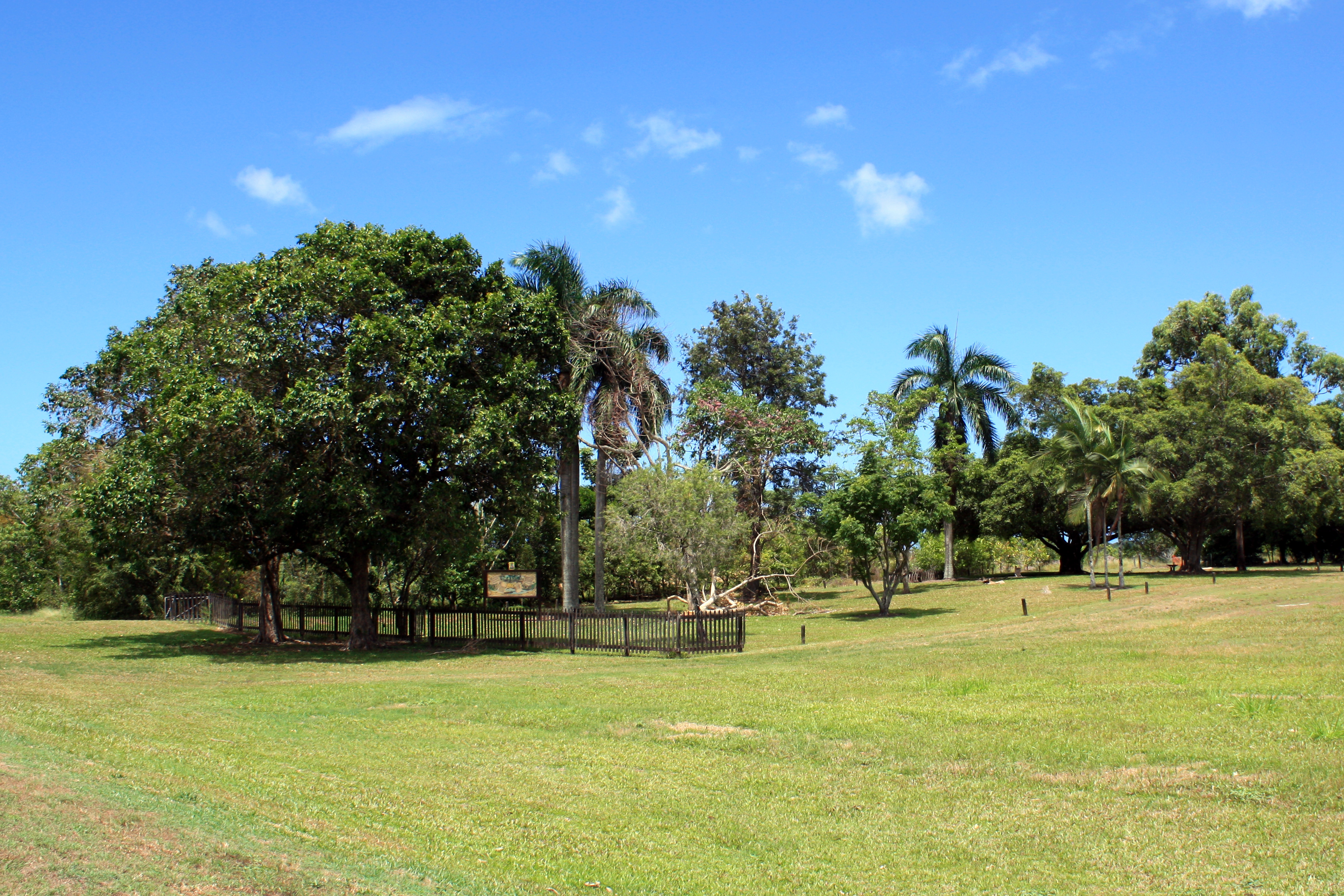
Old Smithfield Cemetery

A five-acre cemetery reserve was surveyed in September 1878 to serve the township, by which time there had already been between nine and twelve burials at the site. Although the township was abandoned in early 1879, the cemetery continued to be used until 1893, with as many as 22 burials recorded. The last burial took place in 1910. The cemetery—designated CEM.90, R.76—is recognised by Cairns Regional Council as a site of non-Indigenous cultural heritage and is the only surviving physical remnant of the original township.

=== Archaeological research ===
In 2022, archaeologist Sarah Jeanna Collins completed a doctoral thesis at James Cook University titled Old Smithfield township, Cairns, 1876–1879: revealing the material life of a nineteenth century community in Tropical North Queensland. Using a people-centred approach, Collins investigated the township's material culture and identified a multicultural and multidenominational community driven by commercial activity, embedded within the broader social landscape of nineteenth-century colonial processes in northern Australia.

== See also ==
- Smithfield, Queensland — the modern suburb named after the original township
- History of Cairns
- Barron River (Queensland)
- Hodgkinson goldfield
- Port Douglas
