= Macalister Range =

Macalister Range may refer to:

- Macalister Range (Queensland), a mountain range in Far North Queensland, Australia
- Macalister Range, Queensland, a locality in the Cairns Region at the southern end of the mountain range
- Macalister Range National Park, a national park protecting the Wet Tropics including parts of the mountain range
