= Macalister Range, Queensland =

Macalister Range
- Suburb
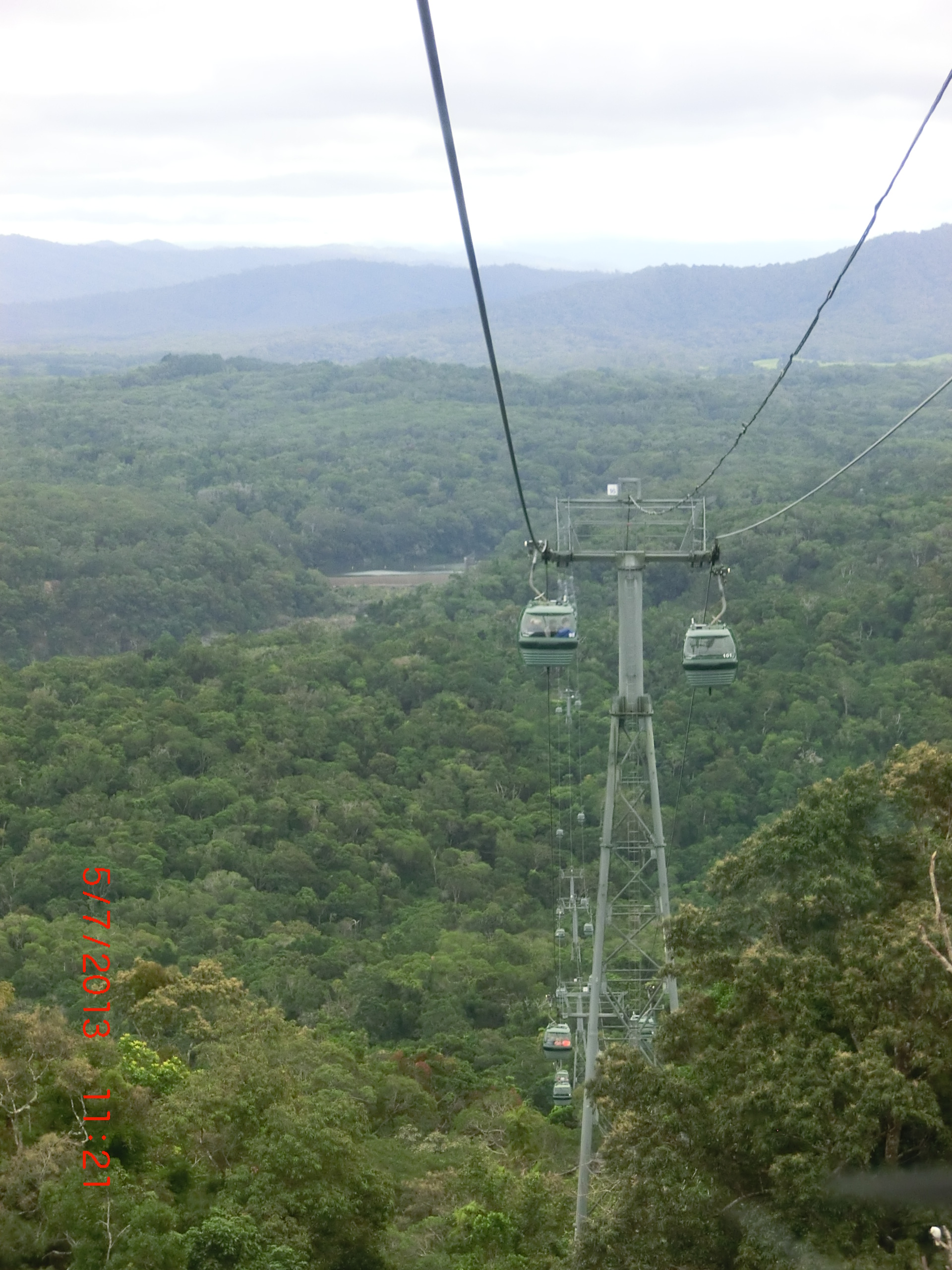
- Looking down from Skyrail onto Macalister Range, 2013

- Interactive map of Macalister Range
- Coordinates: 16.7586°S 145.6516°E
- Country: Australia
- State: Queensland
- LGA: Cairns Region
- Location: 9.2 km (5.7 mi) SE of Kuranda; 19.4 km (12.1 mi) NW of Cairns CBD; 1,805 km (1,122 mi) NNW of Brisbane

Government
  - State electorate: Barron River
  - Federal division: Leichhardt

Area
  - Total: 25.5 km^{2} (9.8 sq mi)

Population
  - Total: 0 (2021 census)
  - Density: 0.000/km^{2} (0.00/sq mi)
- Time zone: UTC+10:00 (AEST)
- Postcode: 4871
Suburbs around Macalister Range
Mona Mona	Wangetti; Coral Sea	Ellis Beach; Palm Cove
Kuranda	Macalister Range	Clifton Beach; Kewarra Beach
Barron Gorge	Caravonica	Smithfield

Macalister Range is a coastal locality in the Cairns Region, Queensland, Australia. In the 2021 census, Macalister Range had "no people or a very low population".

== Geography ==
As the name suggests, Macalister Range is a long narrow mountainous locality containing the mountain range of the same name. The north of the locality extends to the Coral Sea, but the bulk of the locality sits as the backdrop to Cairns' Northern Suburbs on the coastal plain. Therefore the locality ranges from 0 metres above sea level (at the Coral Sea) through to 630 metres at Saddle Mountain with the bulk of the locality at altitudes of 200–400 metres.

The locality consists mainly of undeveloped heavily forested land, most of which is within two national parks. At the far north of the locality, the land is within the Macalister Range National Park while the bulk of the remainder is within the Kuranda National Park. There is a small area of freehold land immediately west of Palm Cove, which is undeveloped. There are also some small areas reserved for other purposes by the Queensland Government, such as the Kuranda State Forest. There is no public access to the Macalister Range National Park as it protects important cassowary habitat and, although there is limited access to Kuranda National Park, the protected area mostly occurs outside of the locality of Macalister Range.

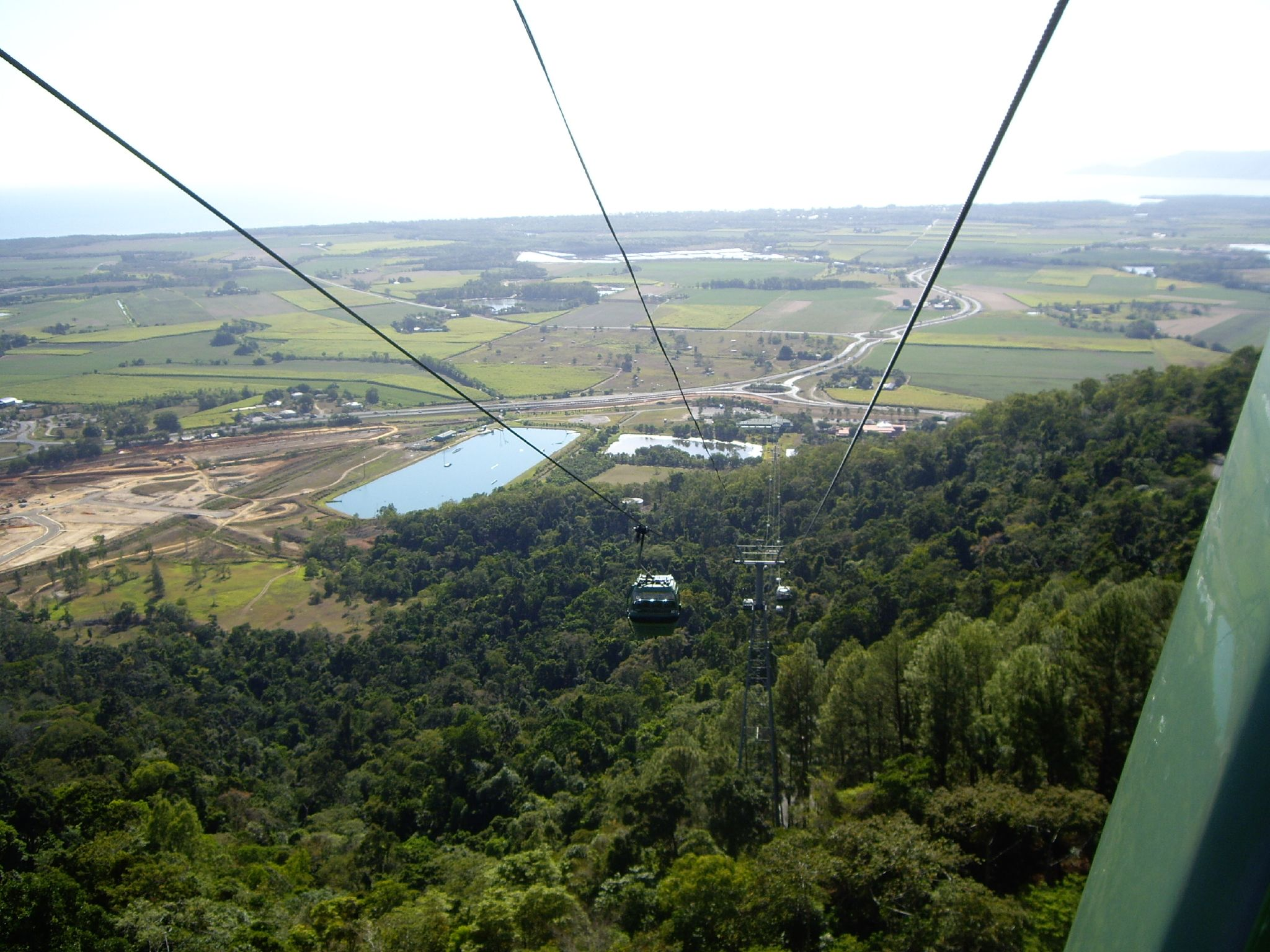
Looking down from Skyrail onto Macalister Range (foreground) and beyond to Smithfield and Machans Beach, 2007

The only roads in Macalister are not to provide access to the locality but to connect areas outside the locality. The Captain Cook Highway runs along the coastline at the Coral Sea in the far north of the locality, while the Kuranda Range Road (the unofficial name of a segment of the Kennedy Highway) connects the suburb of Smithfield in Cairns with Kuranda on the Atherton Tableland in the Shire of Mareeba.

The Skyrail Rainforest Cableway passes over the southern end of Macalister Range; it commences at Smithfield on the coastal plain up to Barron Gorge and then to Kuranda.

== History ==
Irukandji (also known as Yirrgay, Yurrgay, Yirrgandji, Djabuganjdji and Yirgay) is a language of Far North Queensland, particularly the area around the Kuranda Range and Lower Barron River. The Irukandji language region includes the landscape within Cairns Regional Council.

The locality takes its name from the mountain range, which was in turn named after Arthur Macalister, the Premier of Queensland from 1866 to 1867 and from 1874 to 1876.

== Demographics ==
In the 2016 census, Macalister Range had "no people or a very low population".

In the 2021 census, Macalister Range had "no people or a very low population".

== Attractions ==
There are a number of lookouts in Maclister Range, including:

- Jack And Jill Lookout (16.7266°S 145.6411°E)
- Forgan Smith Lookout (16.7663°S 145.6486°E)
- Pease Lookout (16.7883°S 145.6544°E)
- Henry Ross Lookout (16.8372°S 145.6724°E)
