= Kuranda Range road =

Road in Queensland, Australia

The Kuranda Range

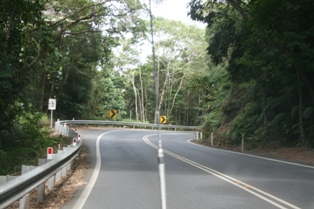
Kuranda Range Road

The Kuranda Range road is an informally named section of the Kennedy Highway in Queensland, Australia. The road traverses the Macalister Range near Cairns (16°50′18″S 145°40′21″E). The 11.5 kilometres (7.1 mi) section of road connects Smithfield, a suburb of Cairns in the Cairns Region with Kuranda, a town in the Shire of Mareeba on the Atherton Tableland, at an altitude of about 360 metres (1,180 ft). Traffic is primarily limited to one lane each way, with overtaking lanes at various points. The Kuranda Skyrail cableway crosses the road twice. Henry Ross Lookout is located near the road's highest point, at an altitude of 430 metres (1,410 ft), and is named after the foreman in charge of building the road to cross the range in 1939.

== History ==
Construction of the present Kuranda Range road as an alternative to the Gillies Highway began in 1940. This was partly as a result of public demand for better access to the Atherton Tableland, but also due to strategic wartime use. Whereas the previous Smithfield Track went relatively straight up the spur from Avondale Creek, passing by the present location of Henry Ross Lookout, and emerged at Mountain Grove, the new road took a far more circuitous route.

The Queensland Main Roads Commission surveyed, planned and constructed the Cairns-Kuranda road. The initial survey work was undertaken by the Commission Engineer A.J. Bond in 1939 in order to determine whether a grade was feasible. Henry Ross was appointed foreman. Single and married men's quarters were also established where the Smithfield Shopping Centre now stands. About 100 men built the road, with the aid of bulldozers, jackhammers and dynamite. Although most workers had to walk up and down the range each day to their work area, temporary blacksmith's shops were set up on site to sharpen jackhammer bits. There were no fatal accidents during construction and the road was completed to the top of the range in approximately 12 months.

Henry Ross chose "The Orange Grove" as the campsite for the second stage of the road into Kuranda. At the time of construction there was a low-level bridge over the Barron River to allow access to rainforest timbers on the eastern side of the river. On completion, the gravel road was predominantly a dual carriageway, however there were parts that were of one-way standard due to their roughness. In 1944 the road was reconditioned, and the Barron River bridge and approaches widened. In the years since, the range road has been improved, widened and re-surfaced many times.
