= Caravonica, Queensland =

Caravonica
- Suburb
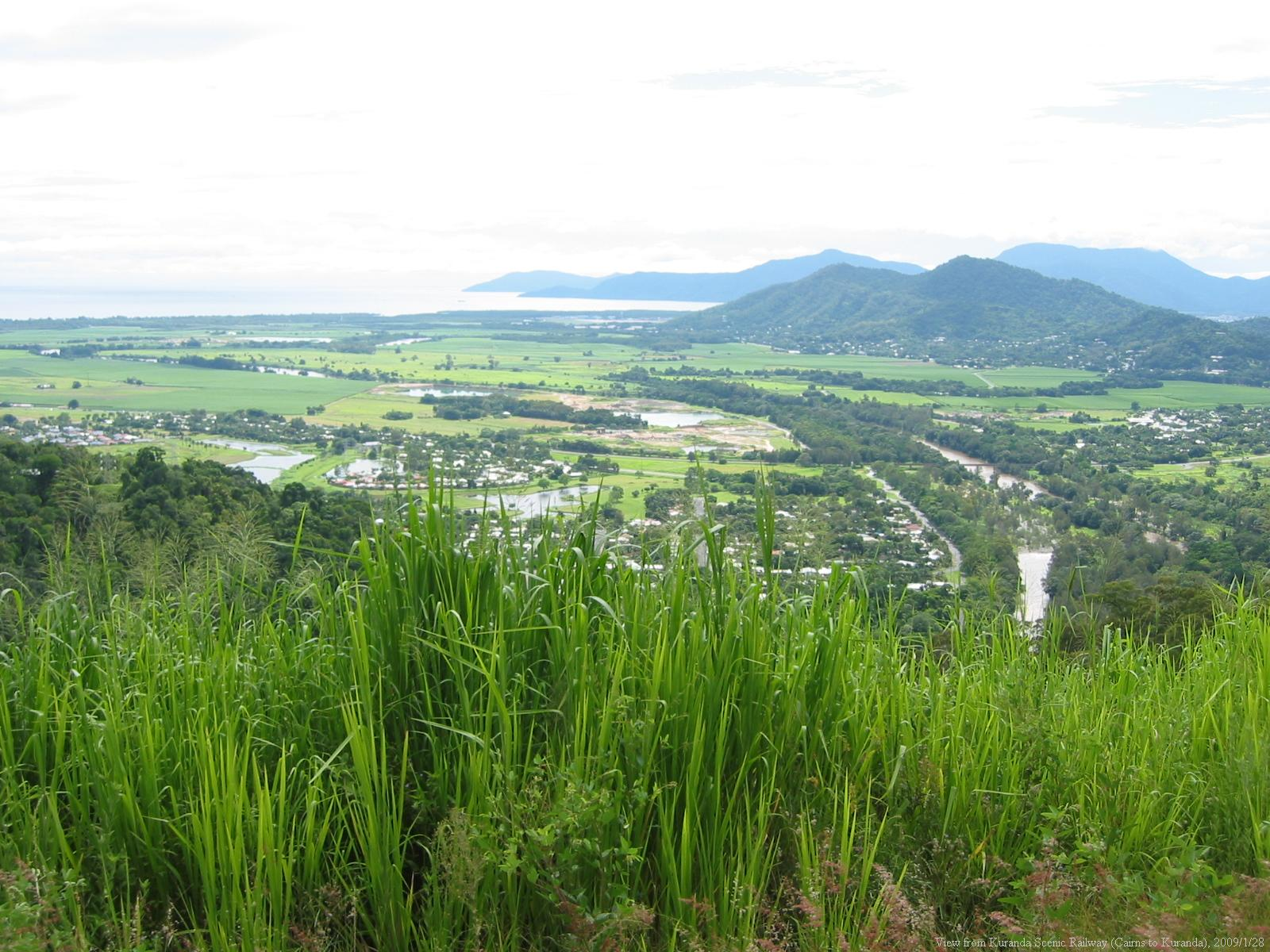
- Caravonica and the suburbs to the south east

- Interactive map of Caravonica
- Coordinates: 16.8619°S 145.6827°E
- Country: Australia
- State: Queensland
- City: Cairns
- LGA: Cairns Region
- Location: 14.4 km (8.9 mi) NW of Cairns CBD; 356 km (221 mi) NNW of Townsville; 1,797 km (1,117 mi) NNW of Brisbane

Government
  - State electorate: Barron River
  - Federal division: Leichhardt

Area
  - Total: 4.6 km^{2} (1.8 sq mi)

Population
  - Total: 2,183 (2021 census)
  - Density: 475/km^{2} (1,229/sq mi)
- Time zone: UTC+10:00 (AEST)
- Postcode: 4878
Suburbs around Caravonica
Macalister Range	Smithfield	Barron
Barron Gorge	Caravonica	Barron
Barron Gorge	Kamerunga	Kamerunga

Caravonica is a suburb of Cairns in the Cairns Region, Queensland, Australia. In the 2021 census, Caravonica had a population of 2,183 people.

== Geography ==
Caravonica lies in the foothills of the Queensland tropical rain forests. The suburb is 1.2 kilometres (0.75 mi) in length from its most northern point to its most southern point. The boundary of the suburb can be found as far north as the Tjapukai Aboriginal Cultural Park and the Skyrail Rainforest Cableway's southern terminal is known as the Caravonica Terminal. The southern border is bounded by Kamerunga, aligning with the Barron River riparian zone along the Kamerunga section of the northern bank of the river.

Lake Placid is a neighbourhood in the west of the locality. Until 1969 known as Barron Waters, it is named after a natural pond in the Barron River, created by a rock barrage. Lake Placid is the entrance to the Barron Gorge National Park. The Lake Placid Tourist Park provides varied styles of accommodation from camping to villas.

A supplementary section of Lake Placid Road leads to Kamerunga Conservation Park and Kamerunga Crossing, a ford across the Barron River. It is the location of an old bridge (no longer for use by vehicles).

=== Maps ===
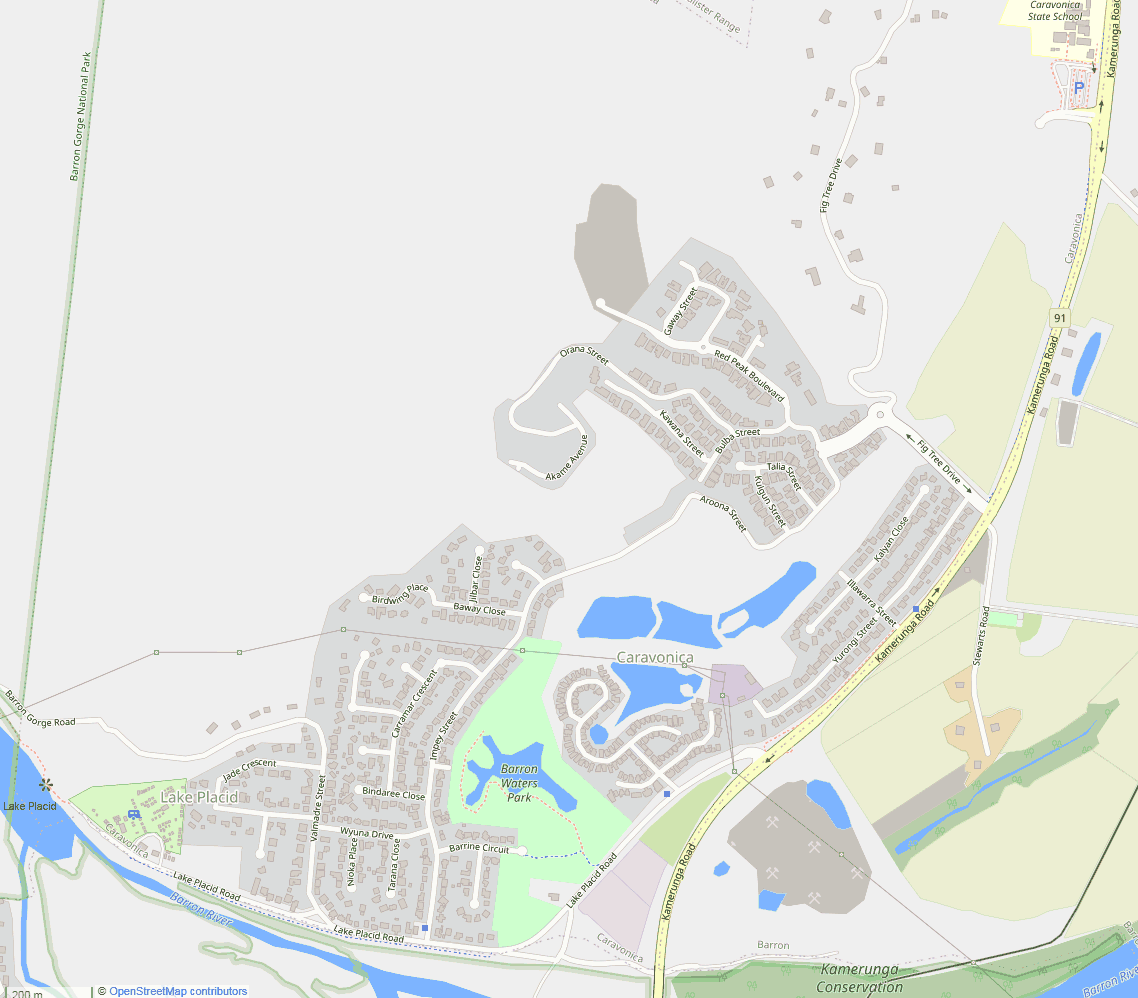
Map of Caravonica

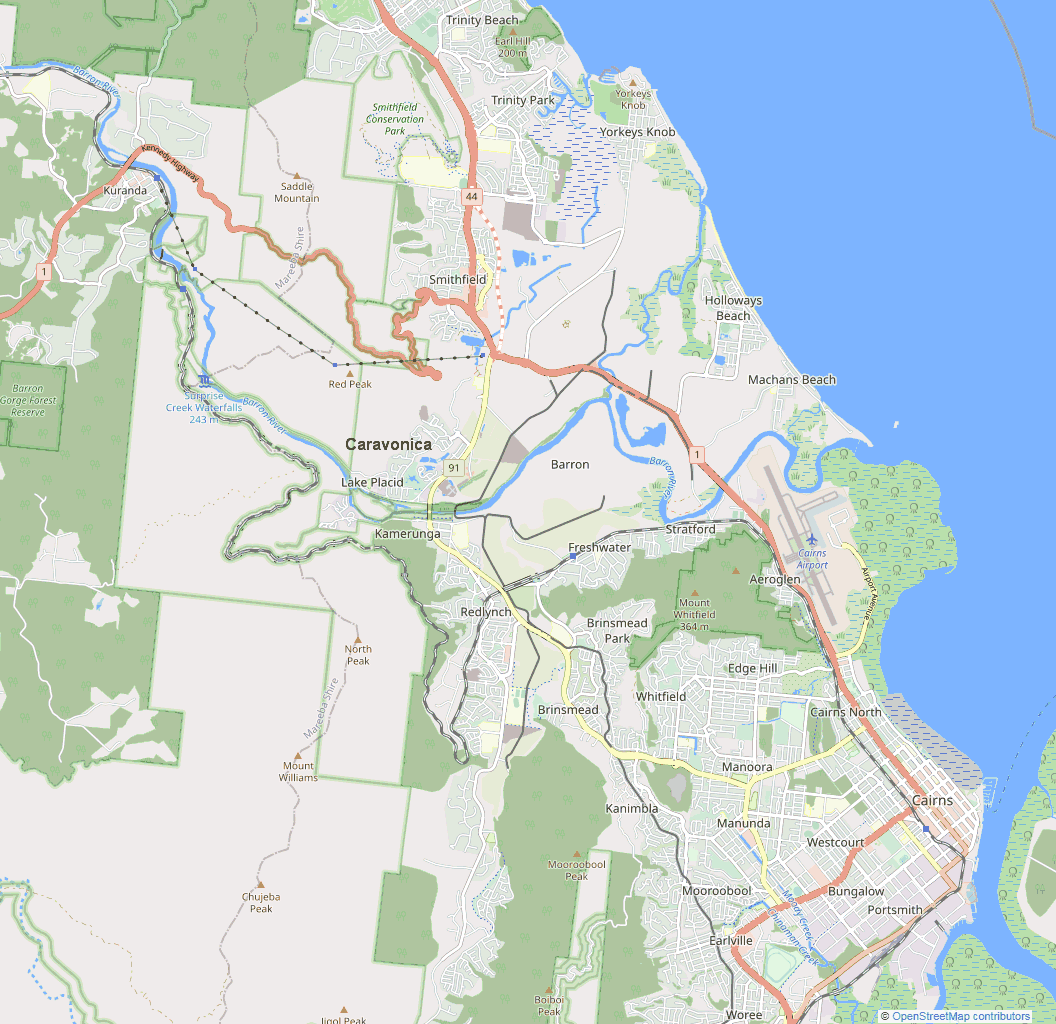
Map of Caravonica in the Region of Cairns

== History ==
Caravonica is situated in the Djabugay (Tjapukai) traditional Aboriginal country. The Yirrganydji people are custodians within the Djabugay traditional country.

Caravonica was originally part of the Shire of Mulgrave and then the City of Cairns local government areas.

The modern history of the area began with the arrival of David Thomatis (1851-1919), originally from Italy and latterly headmaster of Townsville Grammar School. He acquired 800 acres of land in 1884, which is said to have been 1.6 miles wide on the Barron River and stretched as far as Thomatis Creek, which was named after him. In the recent past before that some Asians, presumably Chinese did some informal agriculture there.

He named the land Caravonica Park after the town near his birthplace with the same name in the north-west Italian province of Liguria. Initially, he experimented with growing bananas, coconuts, rice, oranges, mangoes etc.. He was finally successful with the cultivation of a cotton variety that was created by crossing Peruvian and Mexican cotton. This type of cotton, which was cultivated as a perennial plant in tree form, gained a worldwide reputation under the name Caravonica Cotton and was soon also cultivated in many other countries. Thomatis sold his interests in April 1909 in Berlin to a German group led by Barons Werner and Curt von Grunan and Dr Marcus. Soon after the First World War, the Germans sold the plantation and the local cultivation of cotton began to decline due to the fall in the world market prices and the lack of cheap labour.

Kamerunga State School opened on 28 May 1913. It was wrecked in a cyclone in February 1927. On 6 April 1927, it reopened at a new location as Caravonica State School. The decision to relocate the school had been taken prior to the cyclone.

From the 1980s onward Caravonica has been built up as a residential suburb with the erection of single family homes.

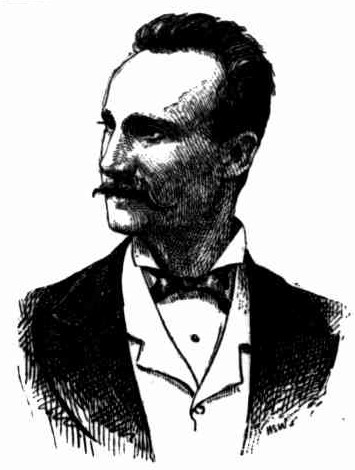
Dr David Thomatis (c. 1889)

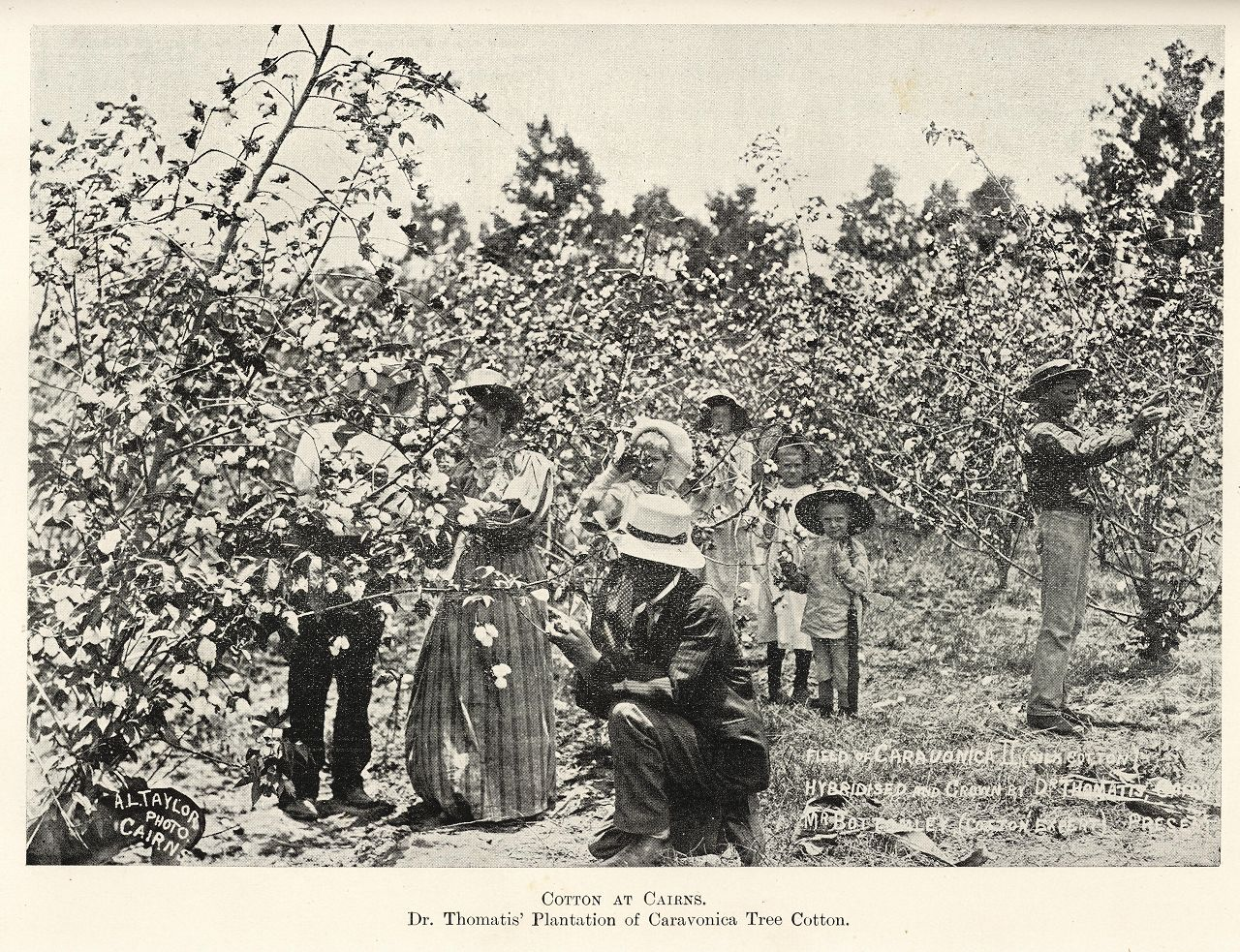
Plantation Caravonica Park (1906)

== Demographics ==
In the 2016 census, Caravonica had a population of 1,989 people.

In the 2021 census, Caravonica had a population of 2,183 people.

== Education ==
Caravonica State School is a government primary (Prep–6) school for boys and girls at Lot 3 Kamerunga Road. In 2018, the school had an enrolment of 537 students with 42 teachers (37 full-time equivalent) and 27 non-teaching staff (16 full-time equivalent). It includes a special education program.

There are no government secondary schools in Caravonica. The nearest government secondary schools are Smithfield State High School in neighbouring Smithfield to the north and Redlynch State College in Redlynch to the south-east.

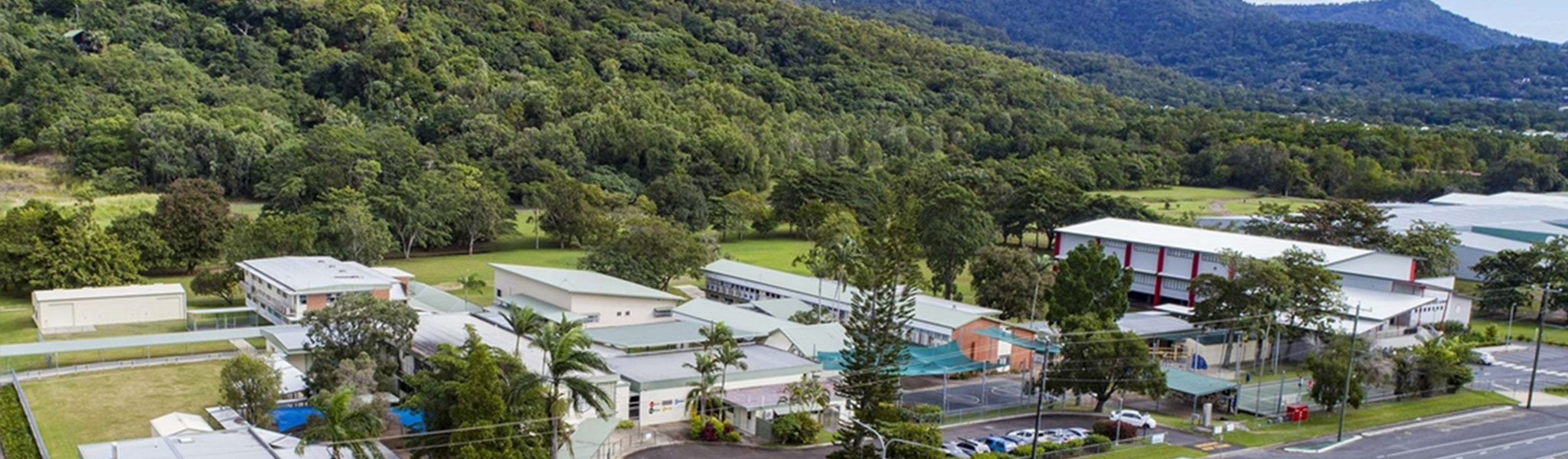
Aerial view of Caravonica State School, 2024

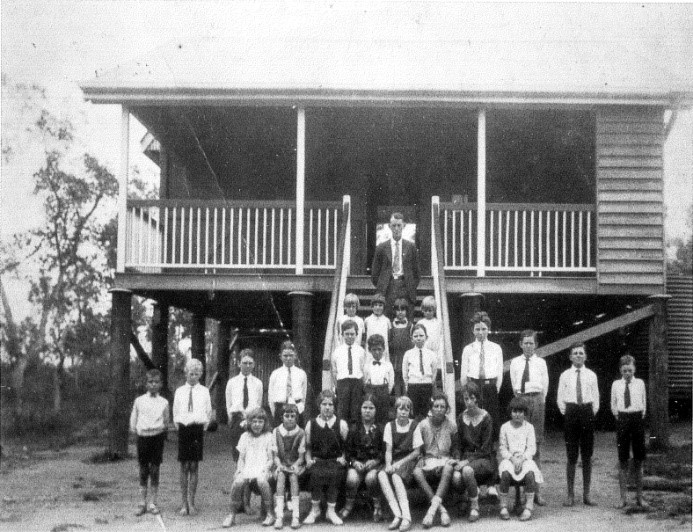
Original school building, Caravonica State School

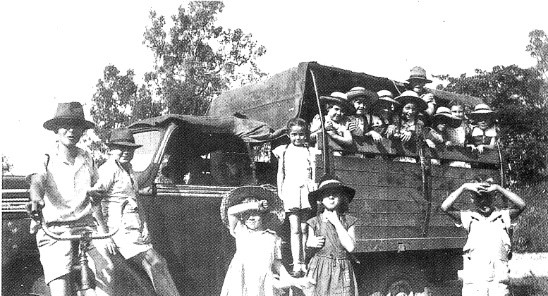
A truck was used a school bus for Caravonica State School, 1950s

== Images ==
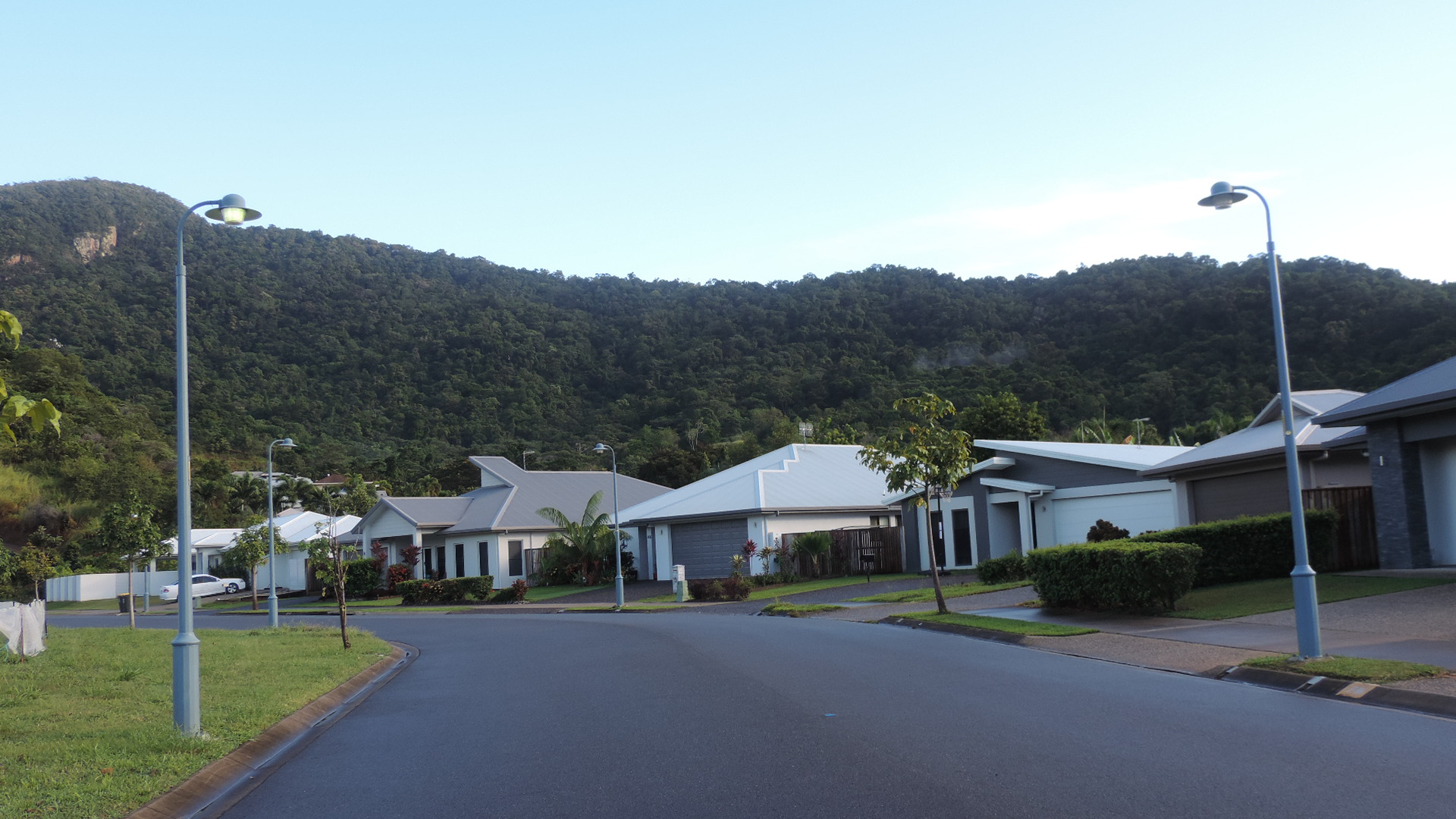
Aarona Street – a typical street

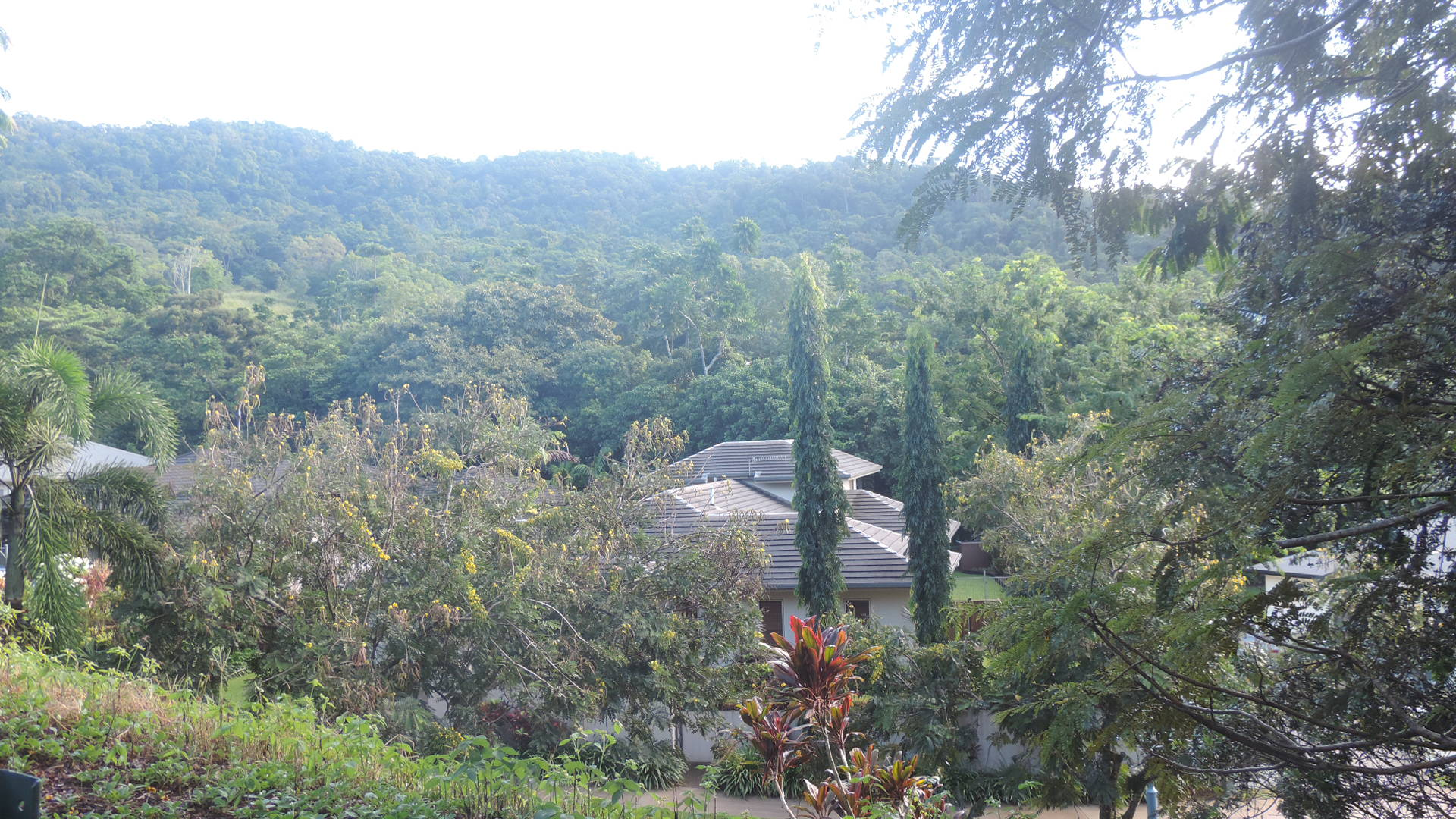
View cross suburbia from Kwana Street

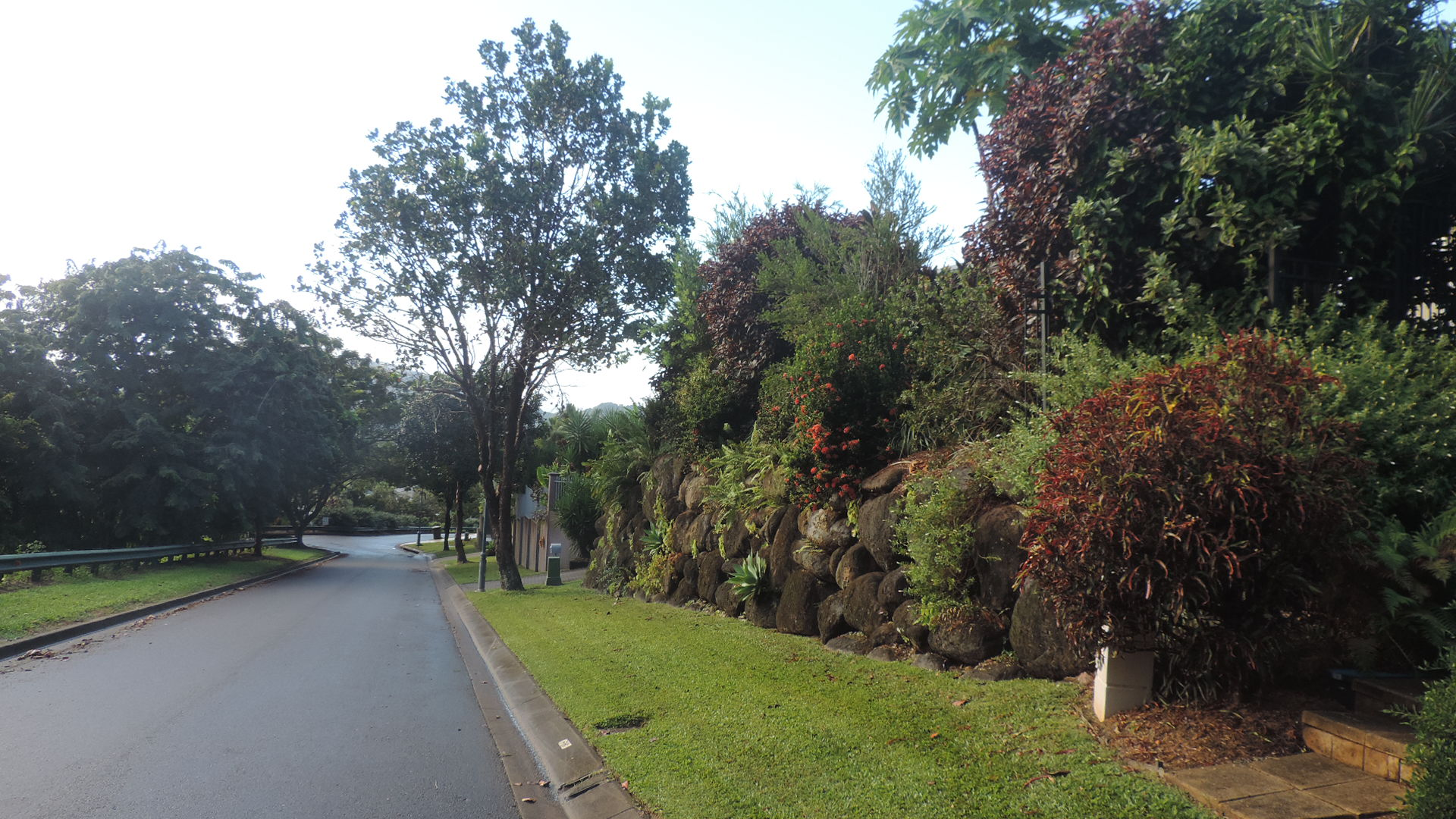
Kwana Street

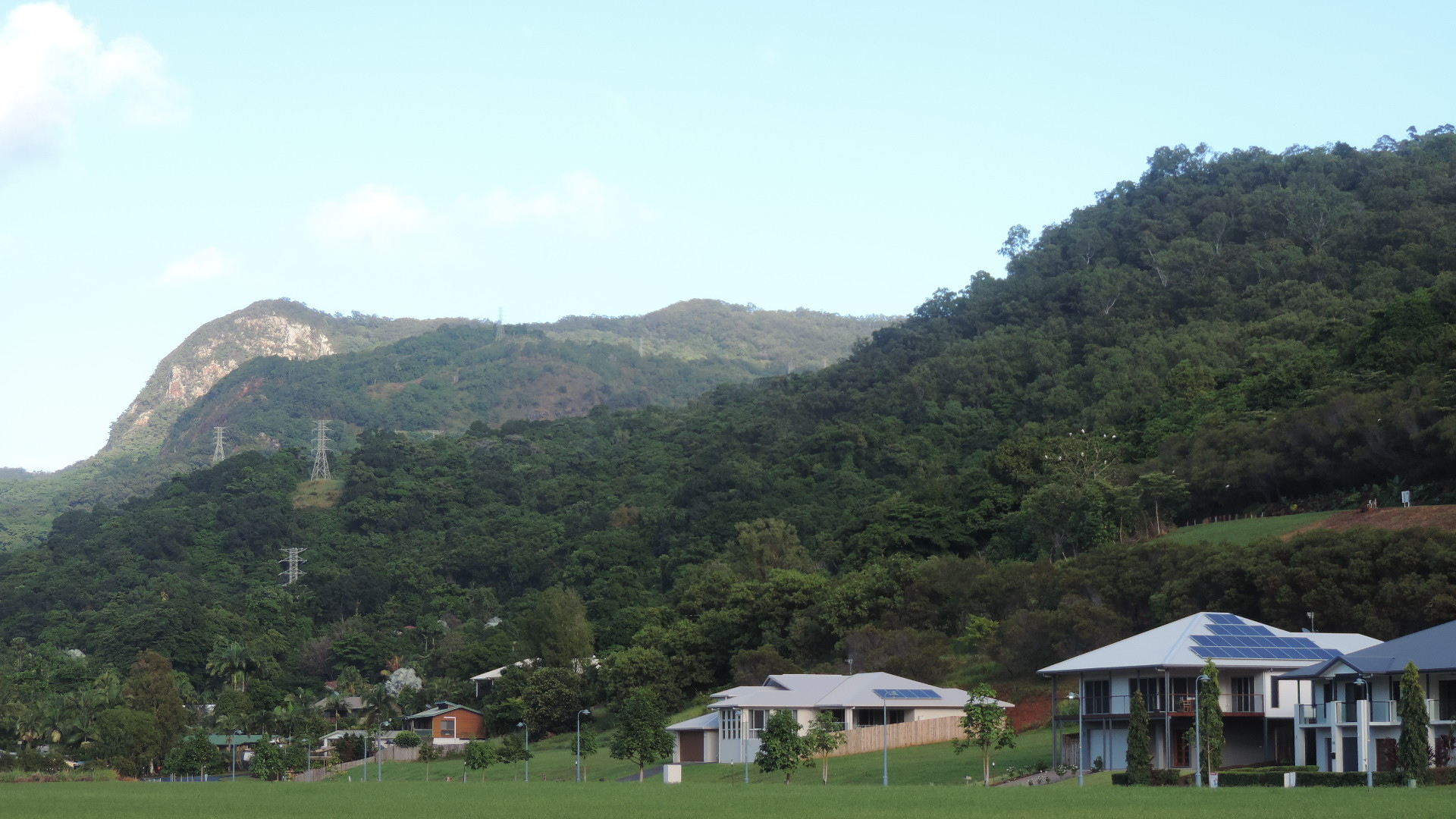
Suburban landscape with Red Peak
