= George Chapman (businessman) =

Businessman from Queensland, Australia

- Occupations: Surveyor and businessman

George Chapman AO is a surveyor, and businessman from Cairns, Queensland, Australia. He has contributed to the community of Queensland as Chairman of Telecasters North Queensland, Ten Network Holdings, TAB Queensland, Cairns Port Authority, Chapman Group and Skyrail Pty Ltd. Other significant contributions include his involvement in the Tjapukai Aboriginal Cultural Park, Cairns Regional Development Bureau, and the Great Barrier Reef Foundation.

In 2011, Chapman was a recipient of the Queensland Greats award.

In 2017, Chapman was inducted into the Queensland Business Leaders Hall of Fame.

== Awards ==
- Queensland Greats 2011
- Queensland Business Leaders Hall of Fame 2017
