= Smithfield, Queensland =

Smithfield
- Suburb
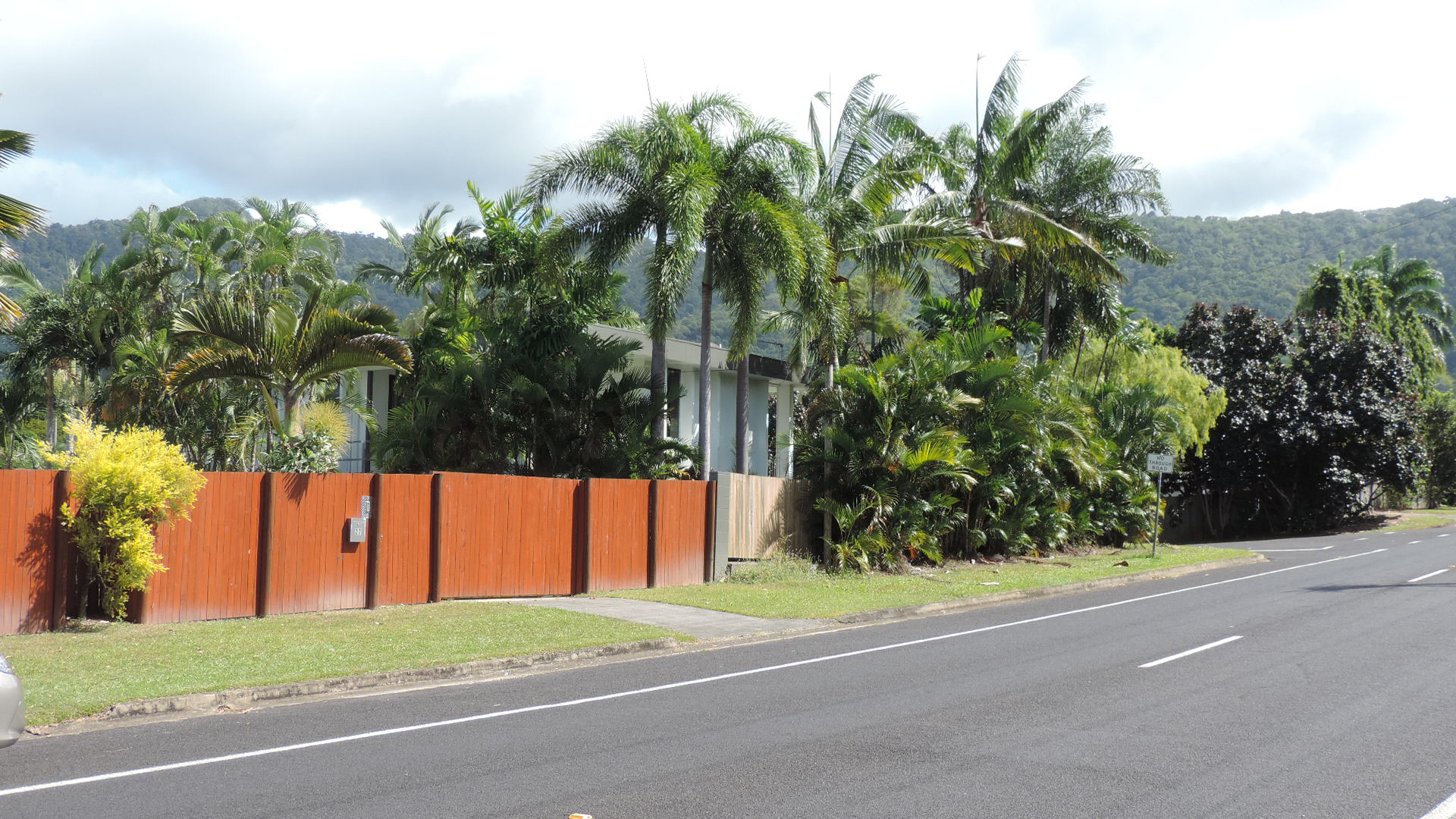
- Looking west along Stanton Road, 2018

- Interactive map of Smithfield
- Coordinates: 16.825°S 145.69°E
- Country: Australia
- State: Queensland
- City: Cairns
- LGA: Cairns Region
- Location: 15.1 km (9.4 mi) NNW of Cairns CBD; 359 km (223 mi) N of Townsville; 1,694 km (1,053 mi) NNW of Brisbane
- Established: 1876

Government
  - State electorate: Barron River
  - Federal division: Leichhardt

Area
  - Total: 13.1 km^{2} (5.1 sq mi)

Population
  - Total: 6,664 (2021 census)
  - Density: 508.7/km^{2} (1,318/sq mi)
- Time zone: UTC+10:00 (AEST)
- Postcode: 4878
Suburbs around Smithfield
Kewarra Beach	Trinity Beach	Trinity Park
Macalister Range	Smithfield	Yorkeys Knob
Macalister Range	Caravonica	Barron

Smithfield is a suburb of Cairns in the Cairns Region, Queensland, Australia. In the 2021 census, Smithfield had a population of 6,664 people.

== Geography ==
Smithfield is about 15 kilometres (9.3 mi) to the north of Cairns City, Queensland, Australia. The Captain Cook Highway passes through Smithfield and the Kuranda Range Road (the first section of the Kennedy Highway) branches from the Captain Cook Highway at Smithfield.

== History ==
The suburb of Smithfield is in the traditional lands of the Yirrganydji people, the original custodians of a narrow coastal strip within Djabugay country.

=== Old Smithfield township (1876-1879) ===
Smithfield was established in November 1876 as a supply township for the Hodgkinson goldfield. It was on the Barron River, in what is now the suburb of Barron. The township was named in honour of prospector and explorer, William "Old Bill" Smith, who had established a camp near here at Kamerunga. In early 1877, the population of Smithfield township rivalled Cairns. Land sales were held in February 1877 and September 1877. On Boxing Day 1877, Smith shot and killed a Smithfield merchant, and then committed suicide by shooting himself. The original township was short-lived, and the establishment of Port Douglas resulted in a decrease in trade. Smithfield township was abandoned in 1879. The current suburb of Smithfield is 3 kilometres (1.9 mi) north of the old township.

== Demographics ==
In the 2011 census, Smithfield had a population of 3,707 people.

In the 2016 census, Smithfield had a population of 5,303 people.

In the 2021 census, Smithfield had a population of 6,664 people.

== Education ==
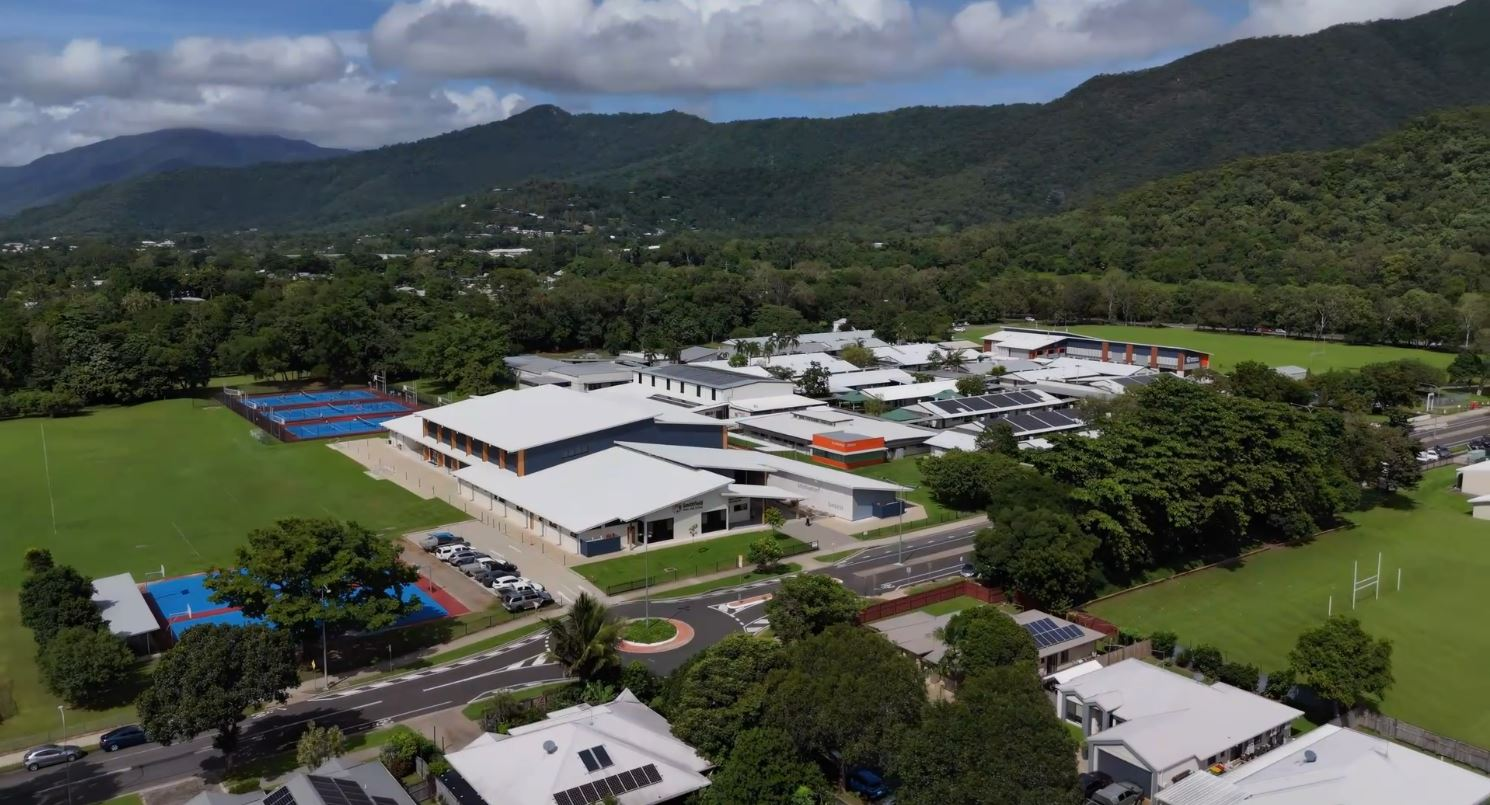
Smithfield State High School, 2024

Smithfield State High School opened on 24 January 1983. The school is a government secondary (7–12) school for boys and girls on O'Brien Road (16.8119°S 145.6956°E). In 2018, the school had an enrolment of 1,122 students with 99 teachers (96 full-time equivalent) and 48 non-teaching staff (37 full-time equivalent). It includes a special education program.

Newman Catholic College is a secondary (7–12) school for boys and girls on the Cairns campus of James Cook University in Smithfield (16.8182°S 145.6923°E). It opened in 2022 for Year 7 enrolments. By 2027, the college will be providing Years 7 to 12 education.

There are no primary schools in Smithfield. The nearest government primary schools are Carvonica State School in neighbouring Carvonica to the south, Trinity Beach State School in neighbouring Trinity Beach to the north and Yorkeys Knob State School in neighbouring Yorkeys Knob to the east.

The Cairns Campus of James Cook University is in Smithfield (16.8162°S 145.6867°E).

== Facilities ==
Smithfield library opened in 1998 and underwent a major refurbishment in 2008.

Smithfield Police Station is at 1119 Captain Cook Highway (16.8233°S 145.6920°E).

Smithfield Fire Station is a 21 Salvado Drive (16.8328°S 145.6947°E).

Smithfield Ambulance Station is at 1 Stanton Road (16.8318°S 145.6926°E).

Smithfield Community Health Centre is at 16 Danbulan Street (16.8376°S 145.6956°E).

The Animal Protection Society is at 233-239 Mcgregor Road (16.8232°S 145.7062°E).

== Amenities ==
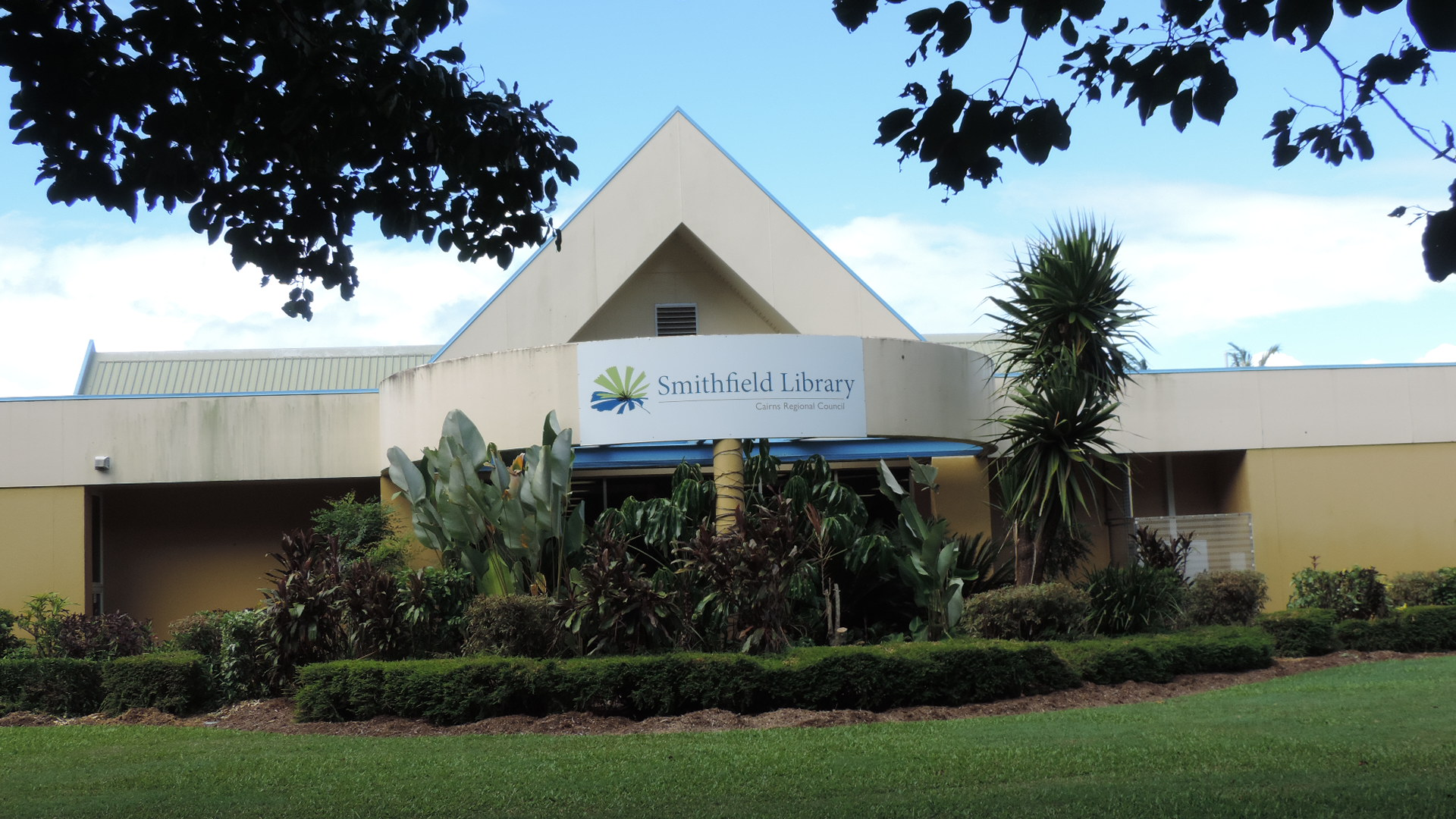
Smithfield Library, 2018

Cairns Regional Council operates a library at 70 Cheviot Street (16.8148°S 145.6943°E).

The Smithfield branch of the Queensland Country Women's Association meets at the CWA Hall on Kamerunga Road, Caravonica (16.8514°S 145.6955°E). It is between the Caravonica State School and the Australian Armour and Artillery Museum.

Smithfield Shopping Centre is at 150 Captain Cook Highway (16.8362°S 145.6920°E). The Smithfield Post Office is within the shopping centre (16.8359°S 145.6920°E).

Northern Cairns Uniting Church is at 47 Cheviot Street (16.8176°S 145.6937°E).

On Leisure Park Road, there are a number of community facilities including Marlin Coast Recreation Centre (16.8144°S 145.6955°E), Marlin Coast Swimming and Fitness Centre (16.8144°S 145.6956°E), North Queensland Surf Lifesaving (16.8161°S 145.6970°E), and Ivanhoes Rugby League Club (16.8153°S 145.6977°E).

Campus Village is a shopping centre on Faculty Close (16.8207°S 145.6944°E) across the Captain Cook Highway from the James Cook University campus.

== Attractions ==
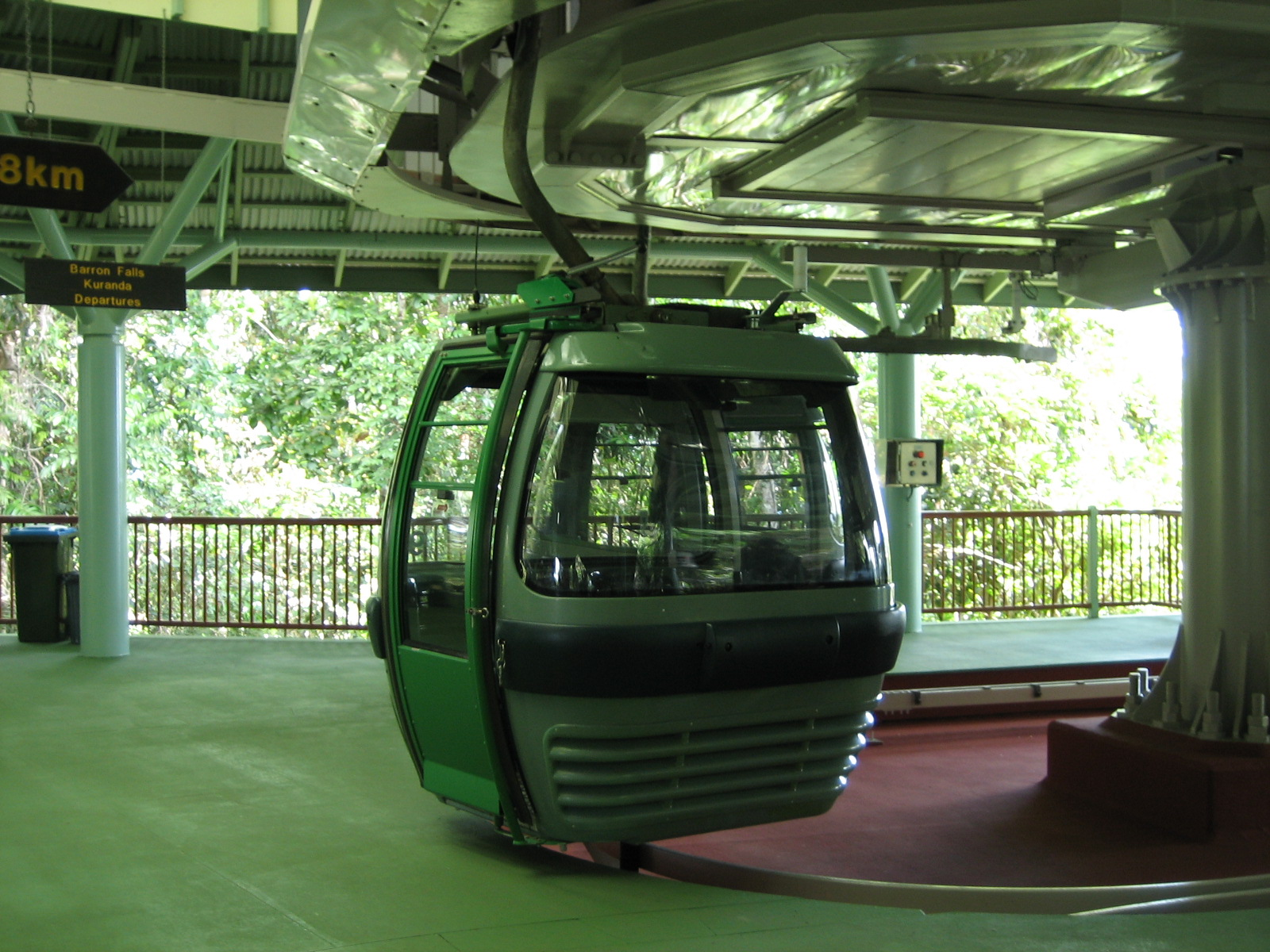
Skyrail Rainforest Cableway gondola

The lower terminal of the Skyrail Rainforest Cableway is at 6 Skyrail Drive (16.8478°S 145.6947°E). The cableway takes visitors through the rainforest of the Barron Gorge National Park to Kuranda at the top of the Great Dividing Range.

Tjapukai Aboriginal Cultural Park was at 4 Skyrail Drive (16.8494°S 145.6928°E). The park demonstrated the authentic culture and traditions of the local Djabugay people. The Tjapukai park closed down in January 2021.

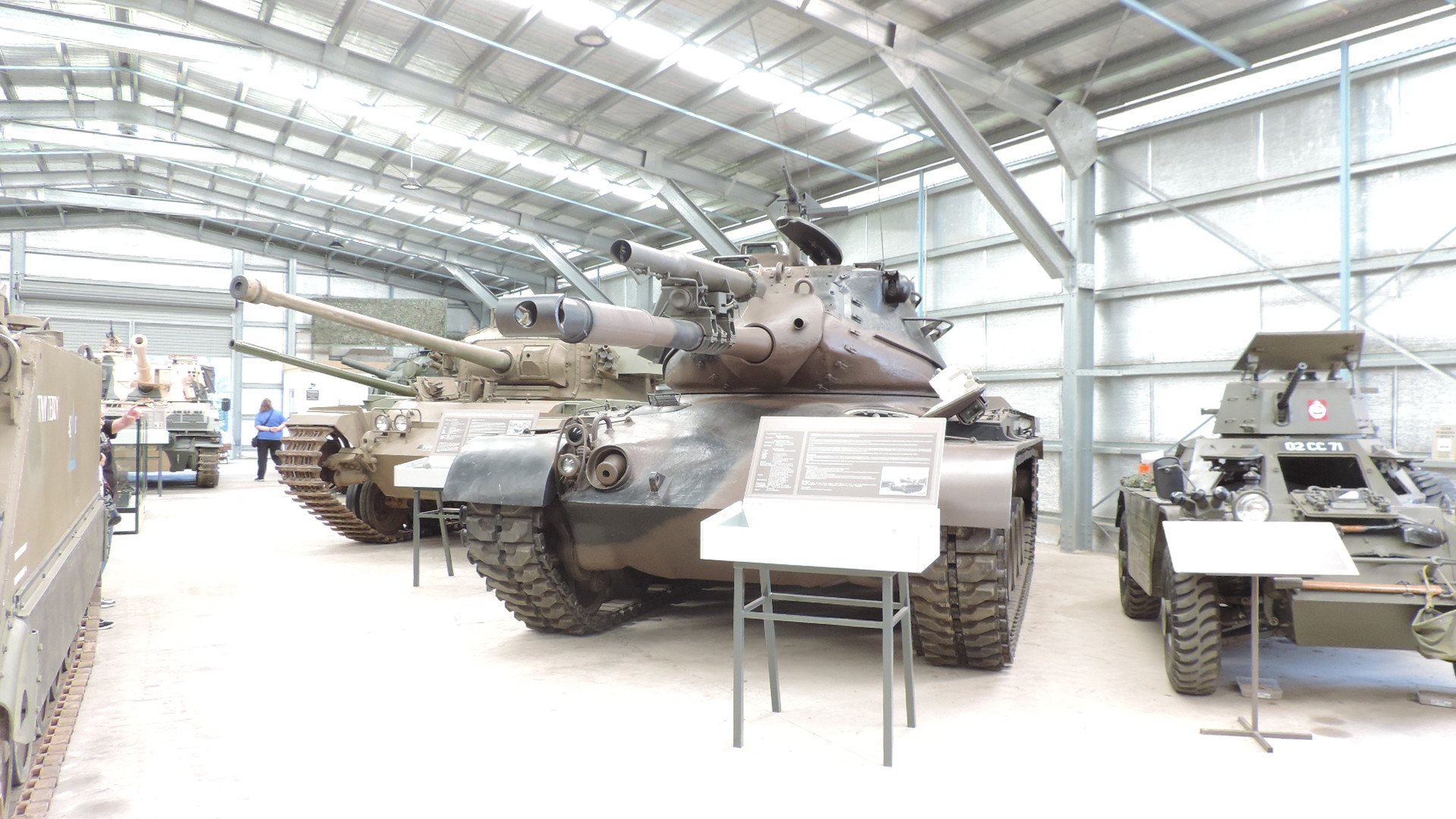
Australian Armour and Artillery Museum, 2016

The Australian Armour and Artillery Museum is at 2 Skyrail Drive (16.8502°S 145.6952°E). It claims to have the largest collection of armoured vehicles and artillery in the Southern Hemisphere.
