= Kamerunga, Queensland =

Kamerunga
- Town
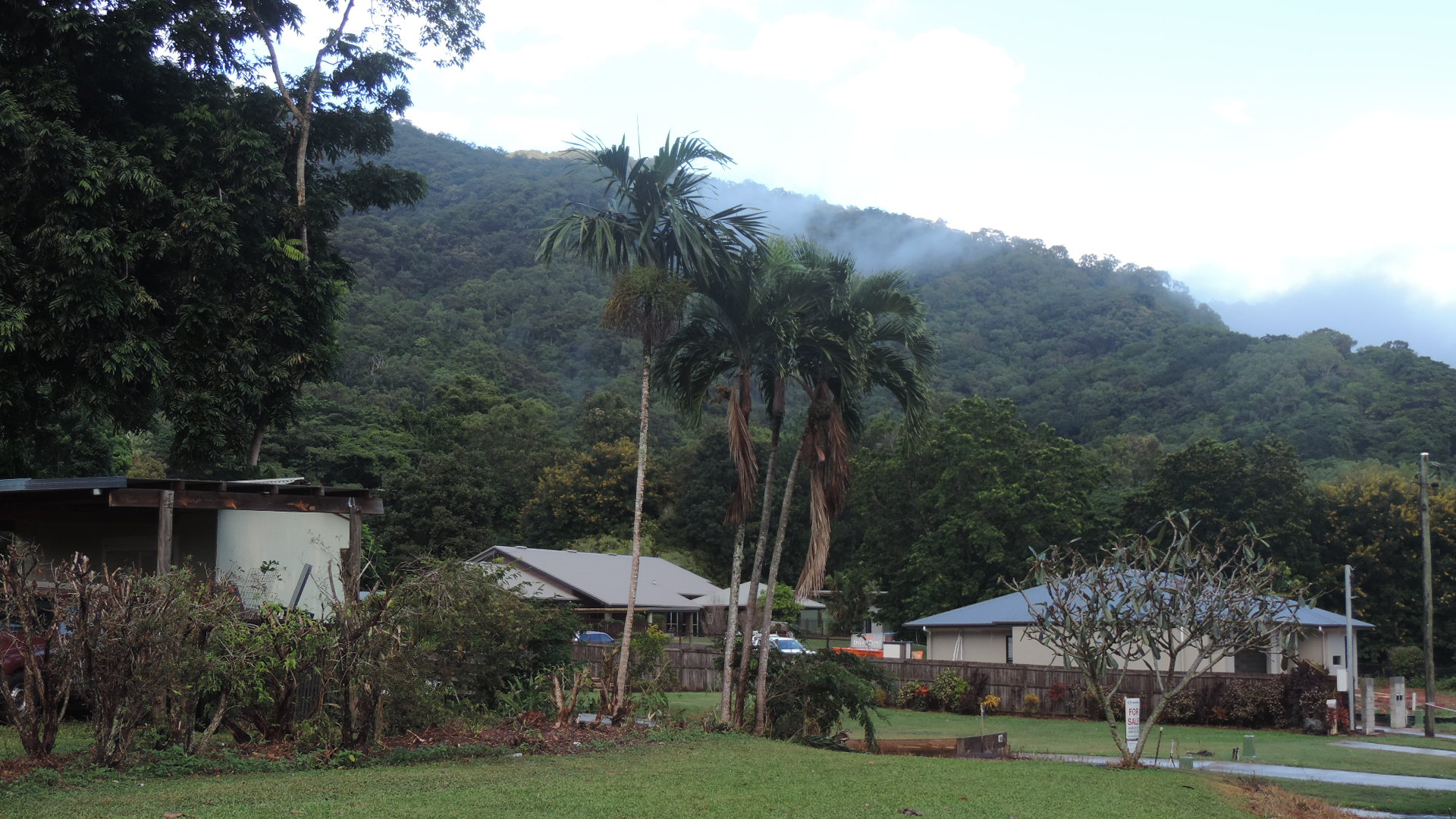
- Looking west along Hastings Street, 2018

- Interactive map of Kamerunga
- Coordinates: 16.8805°S 145.6863°E
- Country: Australia
- State: Queensland
- City: Cairns
- LGA: Cairns Region
- Location: 13.3 km (8.3 mi) NW of Cairns CBD; 354 km (220 mi) NNW of Townsville; 1,689 km (1,049 mi) NNW of Brisbane
- Established: 1980

Government
  - State electorate: Barron River
  - Federal division: Leichhardt

Area
  - Total: 4.3 km^{2} (1.7 sq mi)

Population
  - Total: 962 (2021 census)
  - Density: 223.7/km^{2} (579/sq mi)
- Time zone: UTC+10:00 (AEST)
- Postcode: 4870
Localities around Kamerunga
Barron Gorge	Caravonica	Barron
Barron Gorge	Kamerunga	Freshwater
Barron Gorge	Redlynch	Redlynch

Kamerunga is a town and a suburb of Cairns in the Cairns Region, Queensland, Australia. In the 2021 census, the suburb of Kamerunga had a population of 962 people.

== Geography ==
The Barron River enters the suburb from the north-west (the suburb of Barron Gorge), flows through the north of Kamerunga, exiting to the north-east (the suburb of Barron). Kamerunga Island is a 29.6-hectare (73-acre) island in the river in the north-west of Kamerunga (16.8724°S 145.6759°E). All of the island and parts of the north and south river banks form the Kamerunga Conservation Park (16.8725°S 145.6828°E).

Kamerunga Crossing is a ford across the Barron River (16.8733°S 145.6831°E) to Caravonica. It is the location of an old bridge (no longer for use by vehicles).

In the east of the suburb, farmland predominates while the centre of the suburb is used for residential purposes and the west is mostly undeveloped bushland on the foothills of the Atherton Tableland escarpment.

== History ==
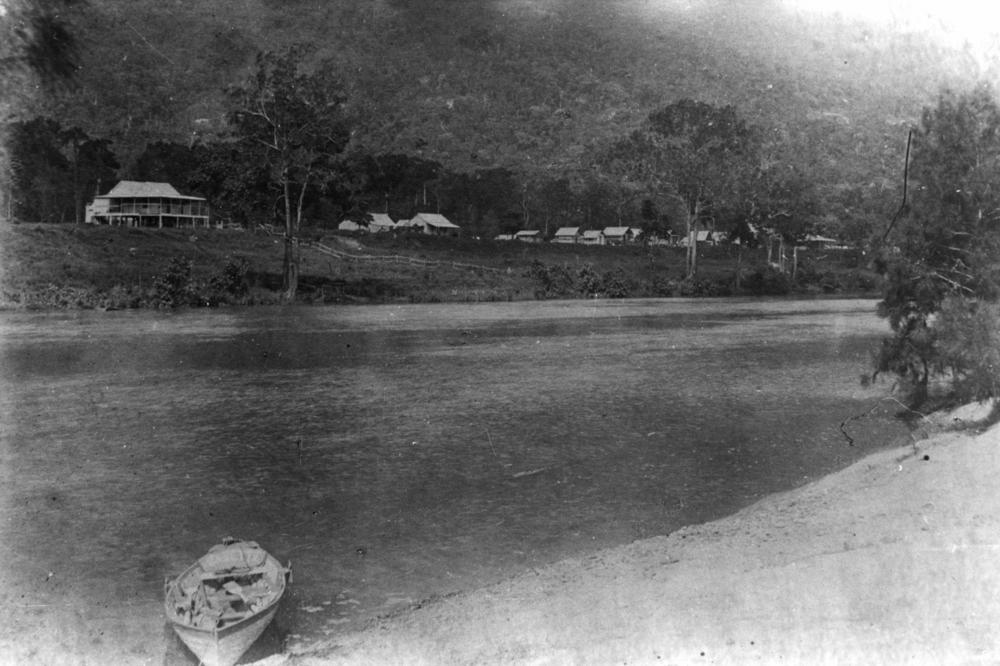
Looking across the Barron River towards Barronville (now Kamerunga), circa 1890. The house Cambanoora on the left belonged to Archibald Meston. The tents are part of the camp for the workers building the Cairns-to-Kuranda railway line.

The town was originally known as Barronville in early 1887, but renamed as Kamerunga in mid 1887, which is the name in the Yidinji language for Barron Gorge.

From 1890 to 1919, Kamerunga was within the Shire of Barron, but was then absorbed into the Shire of Cairns (now the Cairns Region).

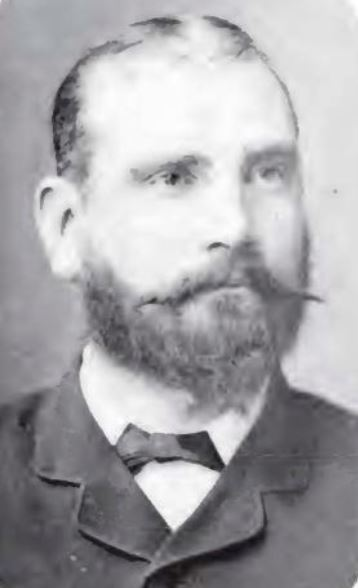
Ebenezer Cowley, 1890

In October 1888, the Queensland Government decided to establish Kamerunga State Nursery to experiment with the cultivation of tropical plants to assess their commercial potential and then grow and sell the successful varieties to Queensland farmers. An initial site of approx 20 acres (8.1 ha) was chosen (now at the approximate site of the Cairns Water Kamerunga Treatment Plant, 1-39 Harley Street, 16.8816°S 145.6873°E), although the site was later extended on a number of occasions further to the south and west to encompass over 1,000 acres (400 ha) although much of it was never cultivated. Ebenezer Cowley was appointed as its first overseer in 1889 and he actively developed the nursery until his death in 1899. The nursery was closed in 1916 as it was deemed "uneconomic". However, in the 1940s, the site was reactivated as a test station for the Horticulture Branch of the Queensland Department of Agriculture and Stock's Plant Industry Division and operated until circa 1989 before closing again.

In 1911, a ferro-concrete bridge was opened at Kamerunga Crossing which provided a dry crossing of the Barron River (except in floods). It was designed by Cairns Harbour Board engineer Charles Norton Boult. A new high-level road bridge (16.8732°S 145.6858°E) opened in 1980 to replace the original bridge (now known as Kamerunga Lower Bridge), which has been retained for walking, cycling and fishing.

Kamerunga State School opened on 28 May 1913. It was wrecked in a cyclone in February 1927. On 6 April 1927 it reopened at a new location as Caravonica State School. The decision to relocate the school had been taken prior to the cyclone.

Peace Lutheran College opened in 1994.

== Demographics ==
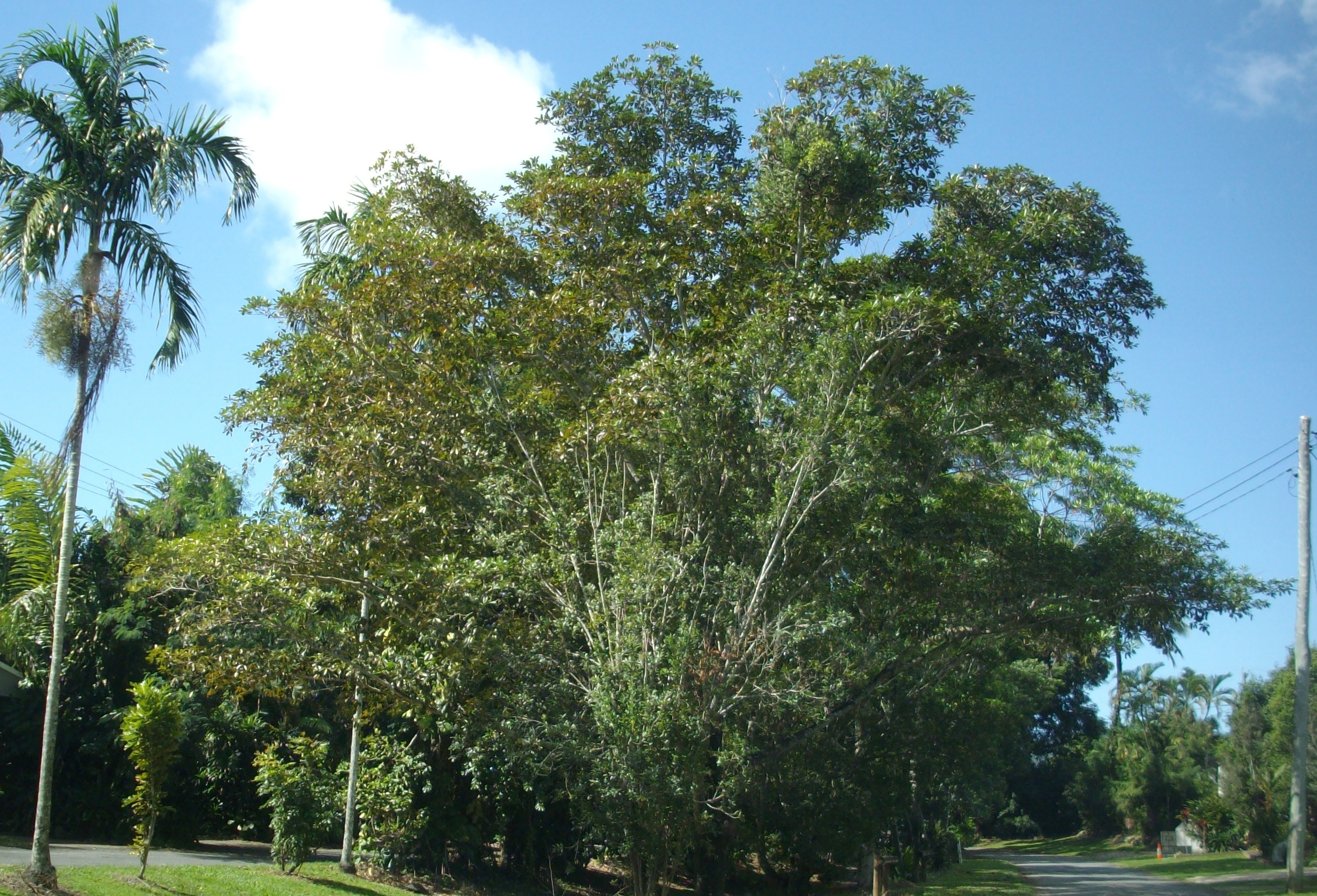
Romney Street, near Barronville Park, 2020

In the 2016 census, the suburb of Kamerunga had a population of 1,049 people.

In the 2021 census, the suburb of Kamerunga had a population of 962 people.

== Education ==
Peace Lutheran College is a private primary and secondary (Prep-12) school for boys and girls at Cowley Street (16.8782°S 145.6897°E). In 2018, the school had an enrolment of 670 students with 52 teachers (46 full-time equivalent) and 48 non-teaching staff (34 full-time equivalent).

There are no government schools in Kamerunga. The nearest government primary schools are Caravonica State School in neighbouring Caravonica to the north and Freshwater State School in neighbouring Freshwater to the east. The nearest government secondary school is Redlynch State College in neighbouring Redlynch to the south.

== Amenities ==
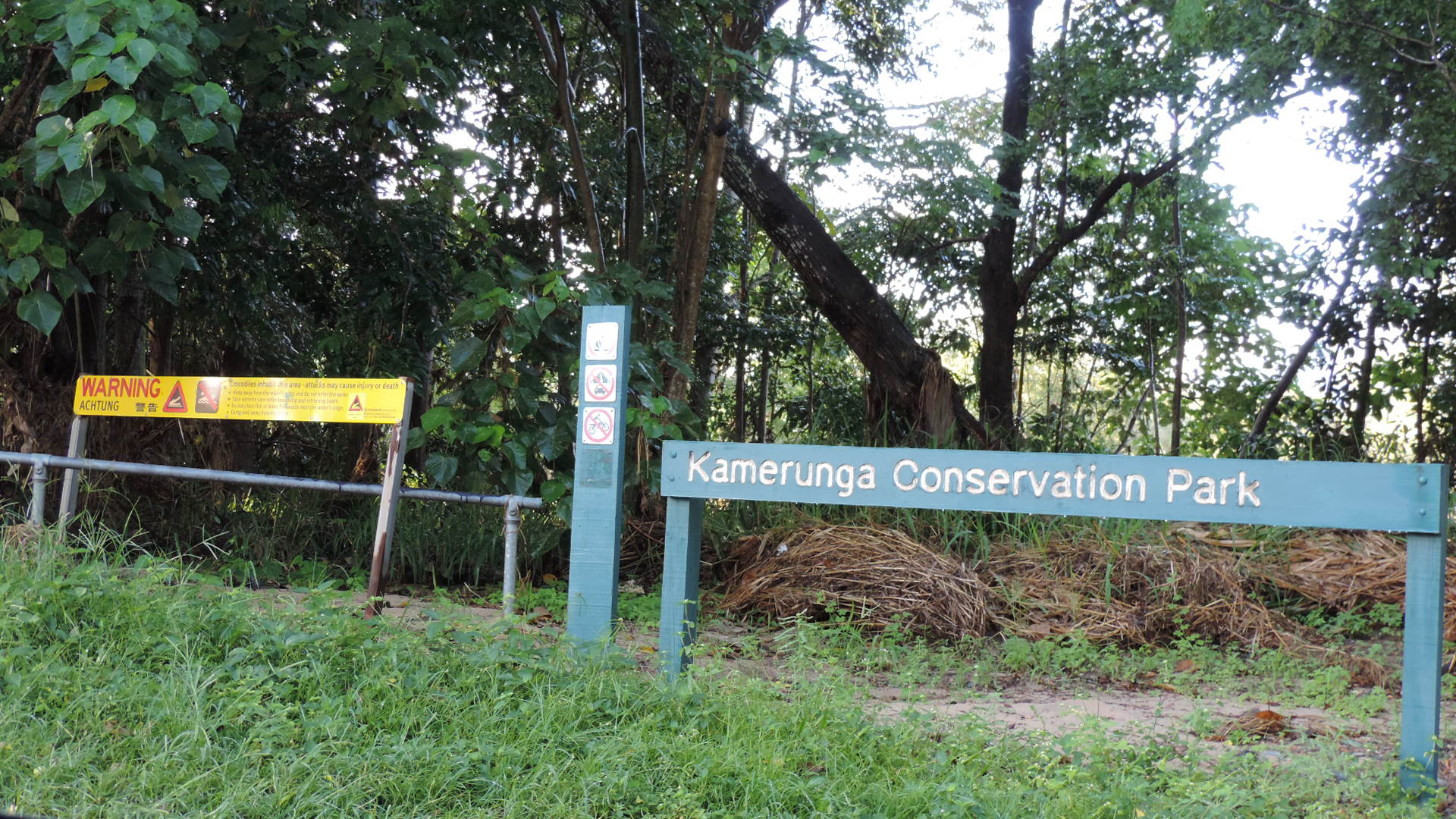
Crocodile warning sign beside the Barron River in the Kamerunga Conservation Park, 2018

St John the Forerunner & Baptist Greek Orthodox Church is at 450-482 Kamerunga Road (16.8839°S 145.6940°E).

There are a number of parks, including:

- Barronville Park between Romney and Hastings Street (16.8771°S 145.6878°E)
- Douglas Track South Park, end of Douglas Track Road (16.8727°S 145.6675°E)
- Douglas Track Park (16.8709°S 145.6703°E)
- Harley Street North Park (16.8738°S 145.6927°E)
