= Skyrail Rainforest Cableway =

Aerial tramway in Australia

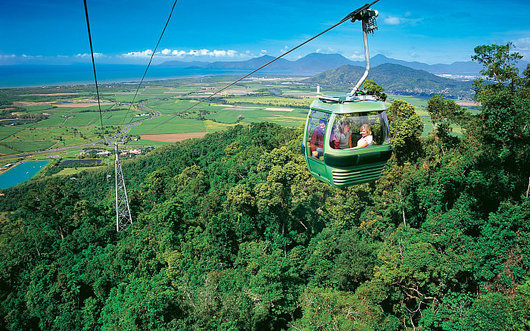
View from Skyrail

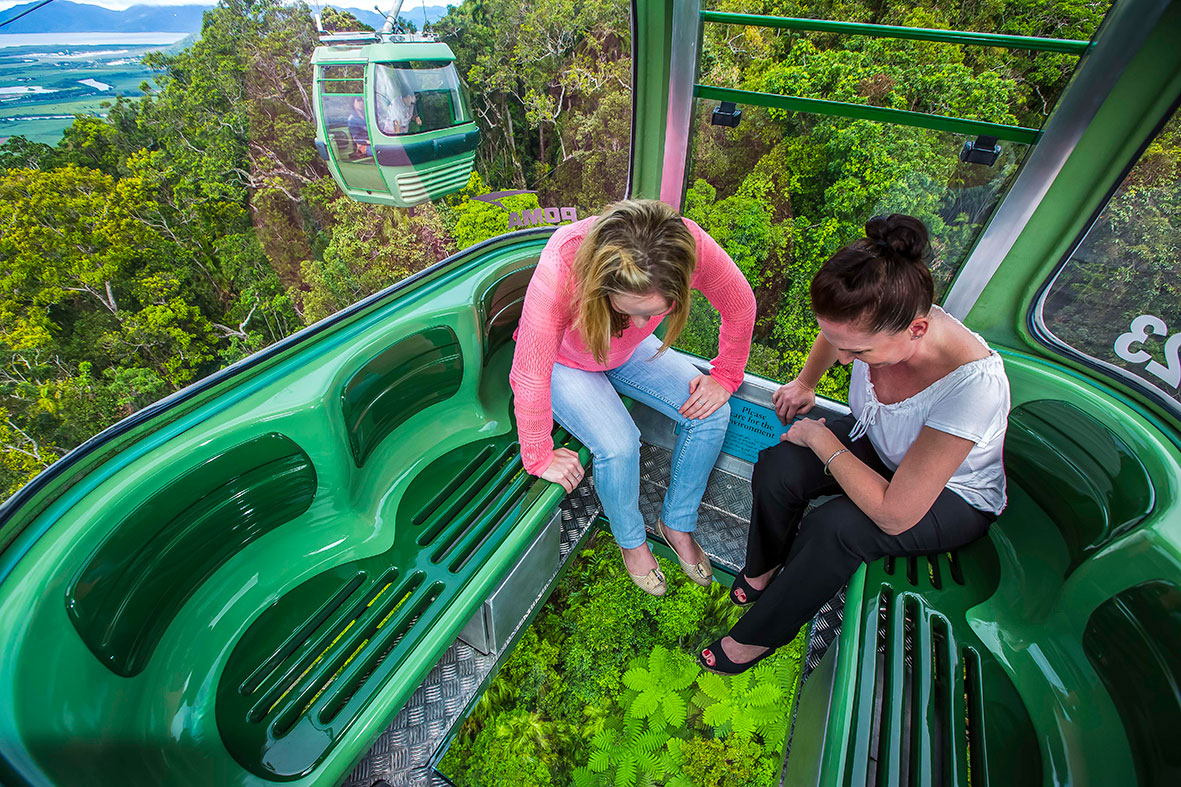
View from Diamond View glass floor gondola

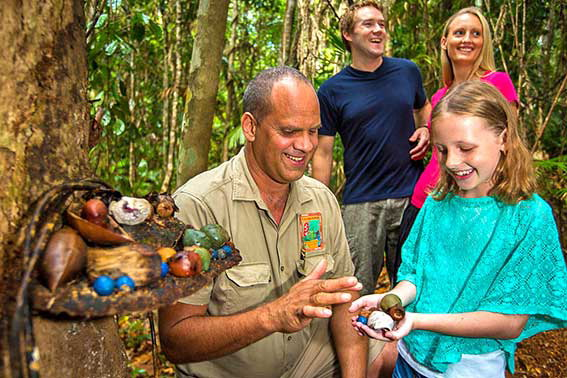
Djabugay Tours

The path of the Skyrail

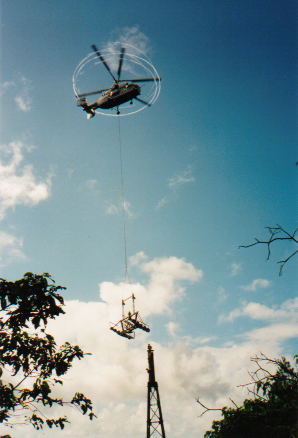
Helicopters were used extensively during construction

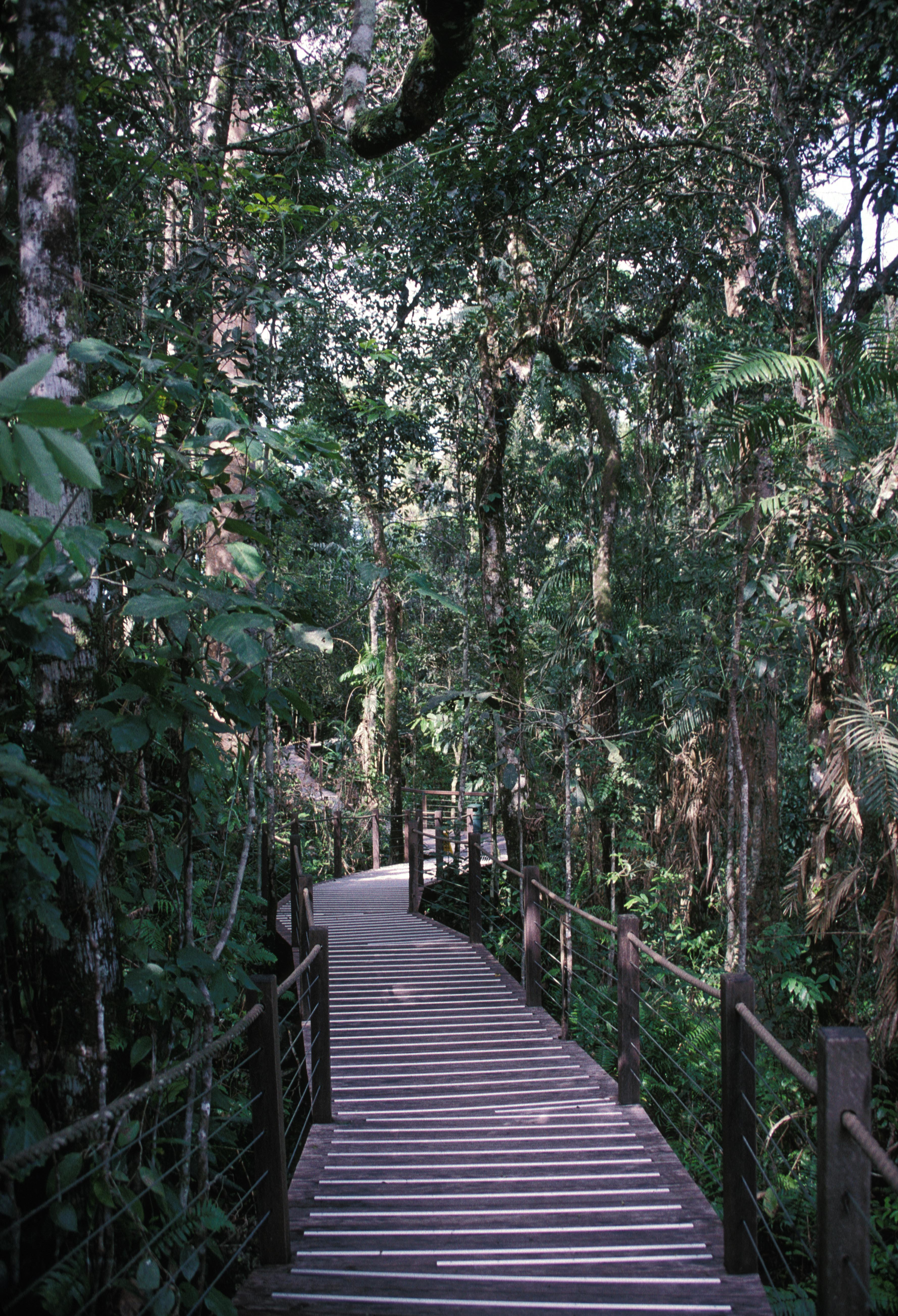
At the Red Peak Station

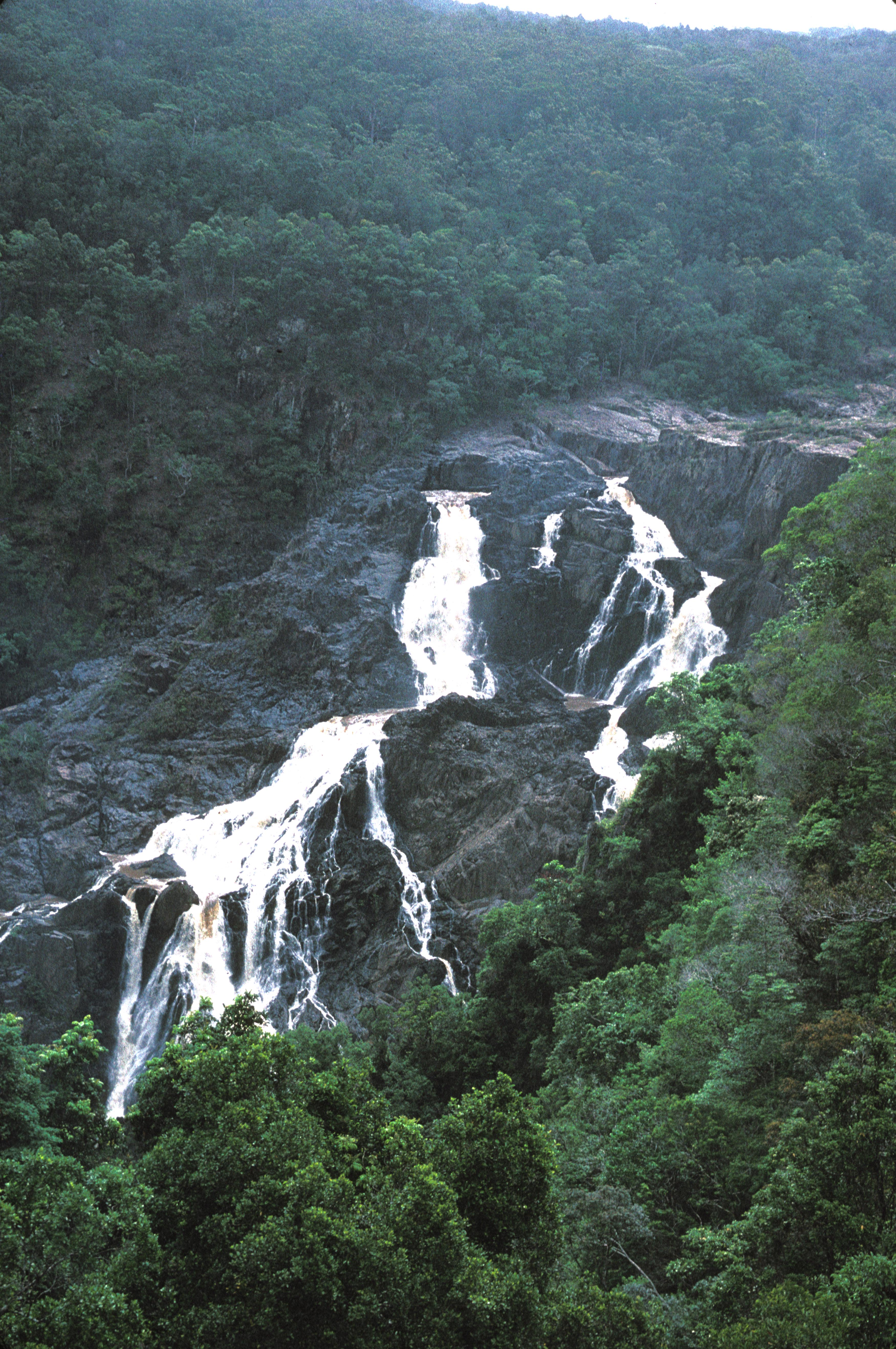
View from the cableway of Barron Falls

Skyrail Rainforest Cableway is a 7.5-kilometre (4.7 mi) scenic tourist cableway running above the Barron Gorge National Park, in the Wet Tropics of Queensland's World Heritage Area in Australia. It operates from the Smithfield terminal in Cairns to the Kuranda terminal on the Atherton Tableland. It was the longest gondola cableway in the world when it was completed in 1995.

The cableway journeys over the Macalister Range between Smithfield and Kuranda using six-person gondola cabins. A one-way trip takes about 1.5 hours, and a return trip is about 2.5 hours. Two rainforest stations, Red Peak and Barron Falls, allow exploration of the forest floor on boardwalks and education of the World Heritage area.

== History ==
The Skyrail concept was put forward in 1987, with construction beginning in June 1994. Pre-construction included consultation with and approval from 23 local, state and federal government agencies and local communities along with numerous assessments including an Environmental Impact Study. It also established an agreement with the Djabugay Tribal Aboriginal Corporation for the protection of Aboriginal cultural heritage. Skyrail is owned and operated by the Chapman Group, led by George Chapman, who was named one of Queensland's 2011 Queensland Greats. His son, Dr Ken Chapman, is Skyrail's managing director and daughter, Karen Hawkins, is a director. The AU$35 million cableway opened to the public on 31 August 1995 with 47 gondolas. A AU$2.5 million upgrade in May 1997 increased the number of gondolas to 114, enabling it to carry over 600 passengers an hour in each direction. In 2006, it underwent an AU$2.5 million upgrade which included a replacement café, expanded ticketing services and a larger retail store. In November 2013, it introduced 11 Diamond View glass floor gondolas, and in April 2014, the Canopy Glider, a ranger-escorted, open-air gondola, was added. Special guests at Skyrail include Queen Elizabeth II and Prince Philip in March 2002, former Australian politician Julia Gillard in 2004, and Australian tennis player Pat Rafter in 2013.

Complimentary ranger guided tours are available at Red Peak. An interpretative display the 'Rainforest Discovery Zone' is located at Red Peak. A Rainforest Interpretation Centre, developed in conjunction with the Commonwealth Scientific and Industrial Research Organisation (CSIRO), is located at the Barron Falls. The Edge Lookout, open to the public since March 2019, is located at Barron Falls. The lookout reaches out 160 metres (520 ft) above Barron Gorge floor, with views across the Gorge and Barron Falls. The lookout also incorporates a glass floor section.

== Construction ==
Before construction, the site was surveyed to make sure endangered and rare species would not be affected. The top soil and leaf litter were collected and reintroduced when construction was complete. Plant seedlings removed during construction were replanted in their original locations. Construction began in June 1994 despite protests from conservationists.

The 32 towers at Skyrail were built in 10×10 m clearings, and workers had to sterilise equipment and footwear before entering sites. Russian Kamov helicopters were used extensively to carry equipment, materials and cement to tower sites and rainforest stations. Helicopters carried 900 tonnes of steel, cement and building materials into the Barron Falls Station alone. Because no roads were built during construction, workers walked to the tower sites each day with their equipment.

== Cableway Upgrade Project (2026-2027) ==
As of 2026, Skyrail is carrying out an A$85 million upgrade of the cableway, which has reached 30 years of operation. The project will replace the existing cableway infrastructure and all gondolas, with the aim of improving accessibility and providing a quieter, smoother ride. Construction is underway, and the cableway is continuing to operate for most of the project, with some temporary closures.

The new gondolas are Doppelmayr CWA Omega IV LWI cabins. Each seats six and has floor-to-ceiling windows, step-free boarding at floor level and folding seats. The upgrade also includes refurbished stations and a more efficient drive system.

The works are limited to above-ground infrastructure, with the existing footings and building pads remaining in place to protect the surrounding rainforest. Skyrail, which is owned and operated by the Chapman family, has described the project as one of the most significant private-sector tourism infrastructure investments in Northern Australia's history.

== Skyrail Rainforest Foundation ==
The Skyrail Rainforest Foundation was established in 2005 to raise and distribute funding for tropical rainforest research and education projects. These include scientific studies of rare and endangered rainforest fauna and flora, canopy ecology and of rainforest species for medical research. The foundation offers funding for students and educators to research into rainforest protection. Since its inception from April 2014, the foundation has provided AU$302,000 towards research projects.

== Awards ==
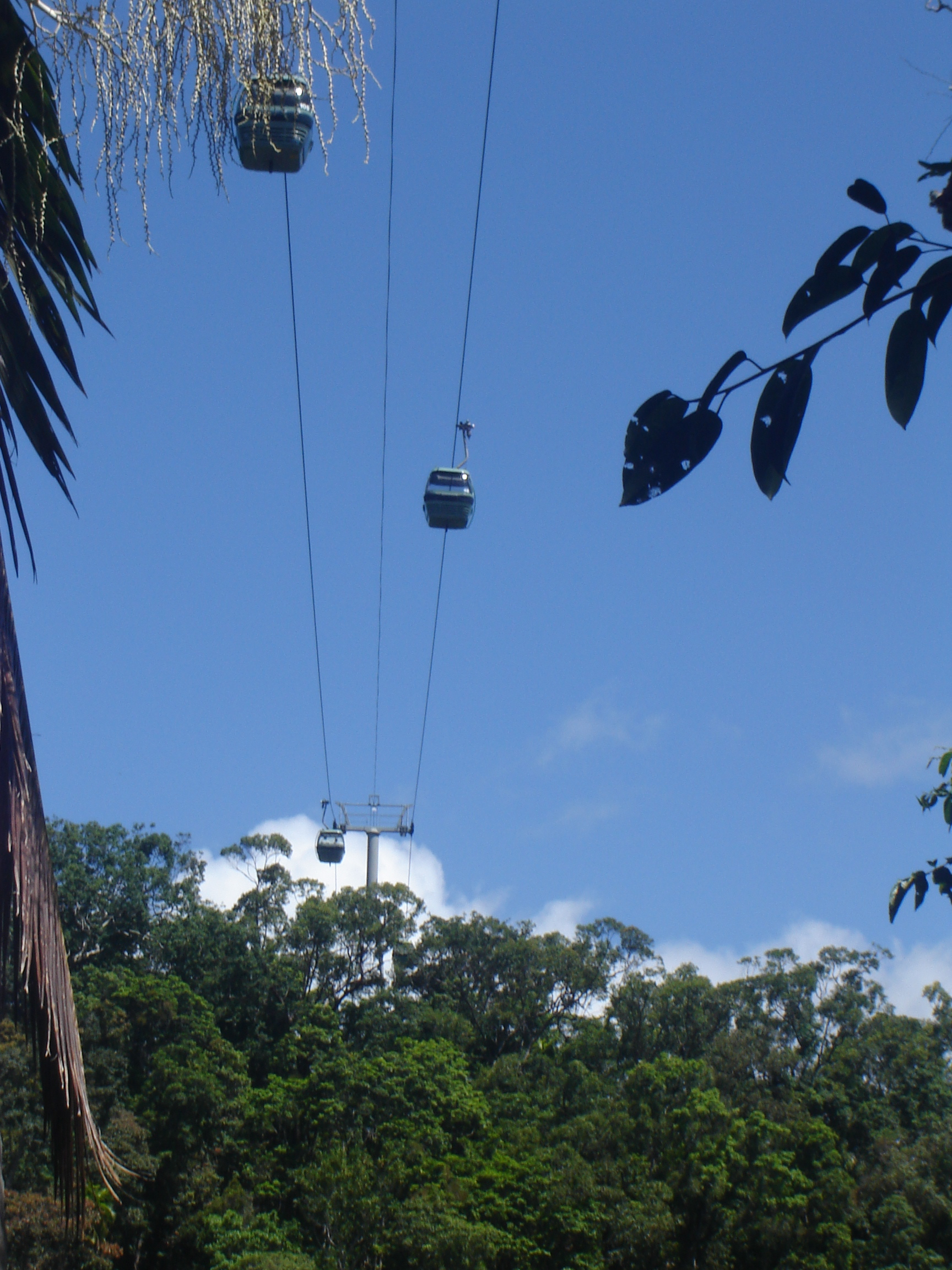
Skyrail over Kuranda

Skyrail won a number of Australian National Tourism Awards including 2008, 2009 and 2010 Excellence in Sustainable Tourism, 1997 and 1999 Best Major Tourist Attraction and 1996 Best Tourist Development Project. Queensland Tourism Awards include the 2010 Hall of Fame – Excellence in Sustainable Tourism, 2008 and 2009 Excellence in Sustainable Tourism, 2000 Hall of Fame Best Major Tourist Attraction, 1997, 1998 and 1999 Best Major Tourist Attraction and 1996 Best Tourist Development Project. Its Tropical North Queensland Tourism Awards include 2014 Best Eco-Tourism, 2009 and 2010 Sustainable Tourism, 2004 Hall of Fame Best Major Tourist Attraction, 1998, 2001, 2002 and 2013 Best Major Tourist Attraction. International Tourism Awards include 2000 British Airways Tourism for Tomorrow International Environment Award, 1999 Wet Tropics Management Authority (WTMA) Cassowary Award, 1996 EIBTM European Greening of Business Tourism Award in the Category of "Most Environmentally Conscious Visitor Attraction" and 1996 Australian Federation of Travel Agents Awards for Excellence in the category "Best Resort or Tourist Attraction" Far North Queensland. It also won the 1999 WTMA Cassowary Culture Award.

In 2009 as part of the Q150 celebrations, the Skyrail Rainforest Cable was announced as one of the Q150 Icons of Queensland for its role as a "structure and engineering feat".

It was the only Australian finalist in the 2014 International Tourism for Tomorrow Award. In 2012, it was the first tourism attraction in the world to receive Platinum EarthCheck Accreditation. It won the 2000 British Airways Tourism for Tomorrow International Environment Award, the 1996 EIBTM European Greening of Business Tourism Most Environmentally Conscious Visitor Attraction Award and the 2008 and 2009 Qantas National Award for Excellence in Sustainable Tourism. In 2000, it was inducted into the Queensland Qantas Award's Hall of Fame for Best Tourism Attraction and in 2010 for Excellence in Sustainable Tourism.

== Accreditations ==
Skyrail holds a number of business and environmental accreditations and certifications, including EarthCheck Platinum, Advanced Ecotourism Certification: Eco Tourism Australia and Climate Action Innovator.

== Trivia ==
- Skyrail operates within the World Heritage listed Wet Tropics area, which is home to the world's oldest tropical rainforest.
- Dating back 130 million years, many of the ancient plants in this rainforest existed when dinosaurs roamed the earth.
- The cableway can operate at a speed of 5 m/s (18 km/h, 11 mi/h); however, its normal operating speed is much slower to provide guests with the maximum time to enjoy their rainforest experience.
- There are 32 towers in total. The highest tower is Tower 6, at 45 m (133 ft).
- Red Peak is Skyrail's highest station, at 545 m (1,788 ft) above sea level. The Kuranda Station is 336 m (1,012 ft) and Smithfield Terminal 5 m (16 ft) above sea level.
- The steepest section of the cableway has a slope of 19°.
- Skyrail Rainforest Cableway has 15 km (9.3 mi) of 40.5 mm galvanised steel rope, weighing more than the equivalent of 100 sedan cars.
- There is a multi-core communications cable, which runs in the middle of the towers, between the two lines of haul rope. It carries all the voice and safety circuit communications.
- The cableway is driven by a 383 kW (500 hp) direct current electric motor located at each drive station: the Kuranda and Smithfield Stations. Each drive station has a backup diesel motor and a further auxiliary Hydrostatic Drive.
- There are two streaming webcams providing live footage and views from the cableway. The cameras are located on top of Towers 7 and 25.

== See also ==
- List of gondola lifts
