= Macalister Range (Queensland) =

Mountain range in Queensland, Australia

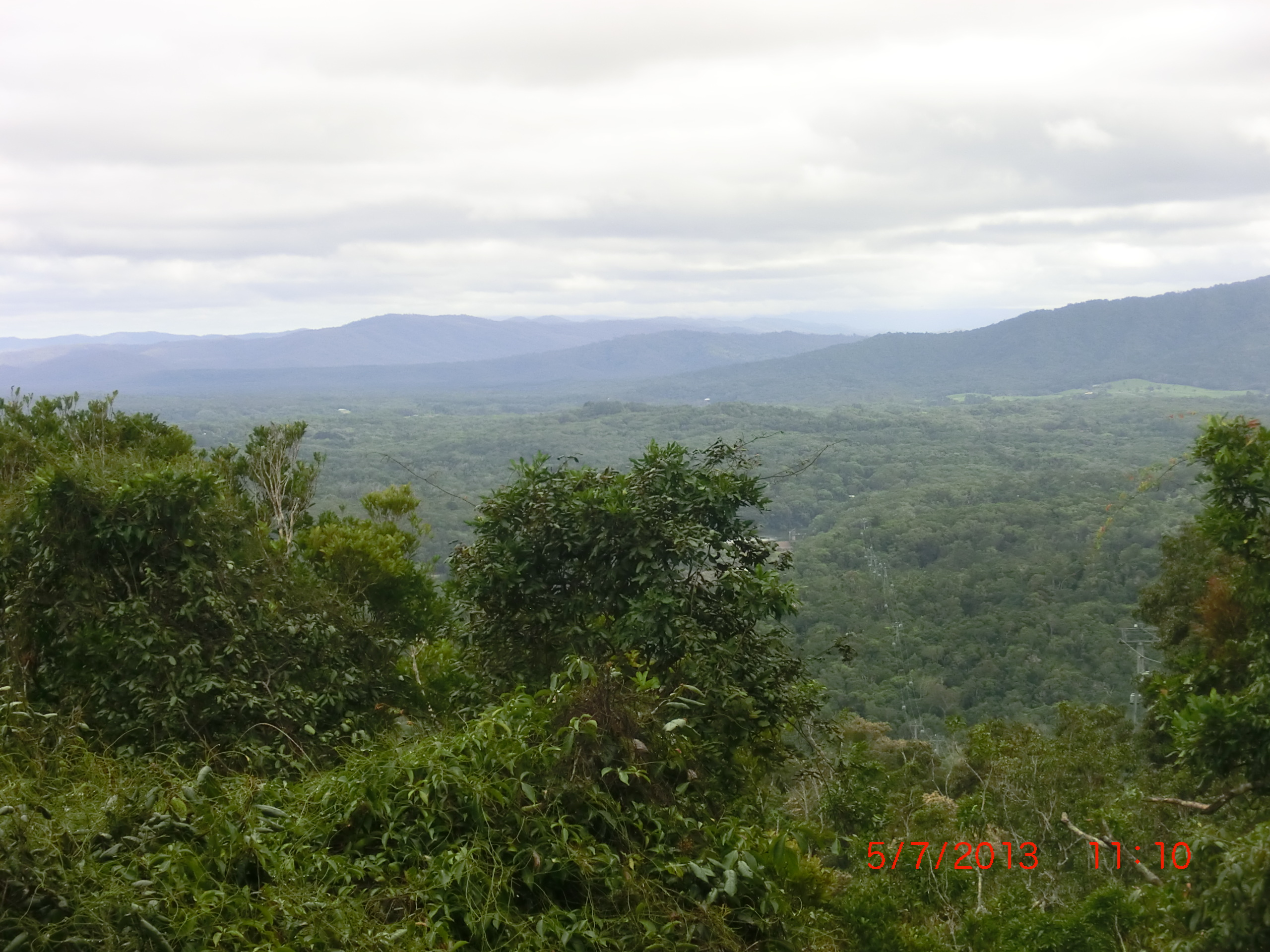
MacAlister Range, 2013

The Macalister Range is a mountain range in Far North Queensland, Australia.

The range commences near the boundary of the localities of Mona Mona in the Shire of Mareeba and Wangetti in the Shire of Douglas (16.6744°S 145.5307°E). It extends south to the locality of Macalister Range in the Cairns Region (16.8199°S 145.6687°E).
