= Northern Beaches, Cairns =

Region of Cairns

Cairns Northern Beaches
- Region
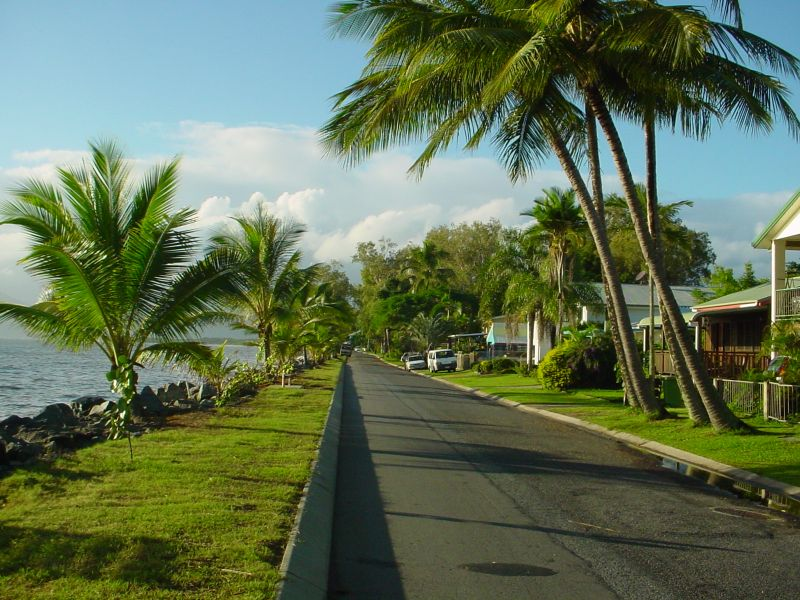
- Machans Beach, one of the Northern Beaches

- Interactive map of Cairns Northern Beaches
- Coordinates: 16°51′20″S 145°44′52″E
- Country: Australia
- State: Queensland
- City: Cairns
- LGA: Cairns Region

Government
  - State electorate: Barron River, Cook
  - Federal division: Leichhardt

Area
  - Total: 254 km^{2} (98 sq mi)

Population
  - Total: 25,124
  - Density: 98.91/km^{2} (256.2/sq mi)
- Postcode: 4870, 4878, 4879
Regions around Cairns Northern Beaches
Macalister Range	Coral Sea	Coral Sea
Macalister Range	Cairns Northern Beaches	Coral Sea
Redlynch	Whitfield, Stratford	Cairns CBD

The Northern Beaches, also referred to as The Marlin Coast, is a coastal region of suburbs located to the north of Cairns CBD, in Queensland, Australia. The area is popular for its beaches, tourism, and residential communities. The Northern Beaches region includes the suburbs of Machans Beach, Holloways Beach, Yorkeys Knob, Trinity Park, Trinity Beach, Kewarra Beach, Clifton Beach, and Palm Cove. It is bounded by the Coral Sea to the east and the Macalister Range to the west. In the 2021 census, The combined suburbs of the Northern Beaches had a population of 25,124 people. The Northern Beaches region lies within the traditional lands of the Yirrganydji people.

== Transportation ==
=== Public Transport ===
Bus Lines in the Northern Beaches
110	111	112	113	110 Palm Cove to Cairns Central 111 Kewarra Beach to Cairns Central 112 Yorkeys Knob to Smithfield 113 Smithfield to Cairns Central (via Dunne Rd)

==== Proposed Public Transport ====
Cairns Light Rail is a proposed light rail network that would connect Gordonvale to Palm Cove and the rest of the Northern Beaches via Cairns City.

The Airport Link is a proposed metro/light rail/bus line that would connect Cairns International Airport to the CBD and Northern Beaches (via a transfer). It could be part of the Cairns Metro, or Light Rail Projects (or be a bus line) depending on which goes ahead.

=== Private (Taxi, Car) ===
Taxis are reliable in Cairns, including the Northern Beaches, they are most common at the airport and outside of the airport they need to be called by phone or by app. Rideshare such as Uber is also readily available.

Cars are very common in Cairns and the Northern Beaches because of the infrequency of busses in the region, the infrastructure for cars is reliable, with the main highway being the Captain Cook Highway, providing a link to the CBD and the rest of Australia.

== Education ==
Front Entrance of Machans Beach State School

=== State schools in the Northern Beaches: (South to North Order) ===
Machans Beach State School, is a government funded mixed-gender education (co-ed) primary (Prep-6) school at 61 Machan Street. There are no secondary schools in Machans Beach.

Yorkeys Knob State School, is a government primary (Prep–6) school for boys and girls at 26–38 Clinton Street. In 2018, the school had an enrolment of 252 students with 19 teachers and 13 non-teaching staff. There are no secondary schools in Yorkeys Knob.

Trinity Beach Community Kindergarten is a Kindergarten for boys and girls at 51 Trinity Beach Rd.

Trinity Beach State School, is a government primary (Prep–6) school for boys and girls at 25-45 Madang Street. It includes a special education program. In 2018, the school had an enrolment of 1,027 students with 68 teachers and 49 non-teaching staff. There are no (government) secondary schools in Trinity Beach.

=== Private Schools in the Northern Beaches ===
Sun Pacific College, is an English language school at 55-65 Poolwood Rd, Kewarra Beach.

Trinity Anglican School is a K-12 school for boys and girls at Poolwood Rd, Kewarra Beach.

Holy Cross School is a Catholic primary (Prep-6) school for boys and girls at 191-201 Reed Road, Trinity Park.

== Amenities ==
=== Machans Beach ===
Machans Beach has 3 Parks, 2 Playgrounds, and 3 Public Toilets. For most of the suburb, public transport is a 5-10 Minute walking distance.

=== Holloways Beach ===
Holloways Beach has a community hall at 65 Oleander Street, It has Toilets (Outside, No Disabled), A Playground, Kitchen facilities, and Public Transport connection. For most of the suburb, public transport is a 5-10 Minute walking distance.

=== Yorkeys Knob ===
Yorkeys Knob has a community hall at 58 Wattle Street, It has Toilets (Male, Female, Accessible), A Playground, Kitchen facilities, and Public Transport connection. For most of the suburb, public transport is a 5-10 Minute walking distance.

=== Trinity Park ===
Trinity Park has 11 Parks and 6 Playgrounds situated around their marina. It has Walkable Public Transit Connections in the suburb center.

=== Trinity Beach ===
Trinity Beach has a community hall at 51 Trinity Beach Road, In 2024, a new community hall was constructed by the Cairns Regional Council Trinity Beach has 2 Fitness Stations, one at Coastwatcher Park in the south, and one at Trinity Beach Foreshore Park, in the north of the suburb. Trinity Beach also has Public and Accessible toilets, they are usually around parks and other amenities. For most of the suburb, public transport is a 5-10 Minute walking distance.

=== Kewarra Beach ===
Kewarra Beach has a community hall with Toilets, Kitchen facilities, and a Playground at 41 (Lot 502) Poolwood Road, There are 11 Parks, 10 Playgrounds, and 1 Public Toilet. For most of the suburb, public transport is a 5-10 Minute walking distance.

=== Clifton Beach ===
Clifton Beach has 5 Parks, 4 Playgrounds, 1 BMX Track, and 1 Public Toilet. It has Relatively Walkable Public Transit Connections.

=== Palm Cove ===
Palm Cove has 5 Parks, 2 Public Toilets, and 1 Playground. It has Relatively Walkable Public Transit Connections.

Parks In The Northern Beaches
Machans Beach	Holloways Beach	Yorkeys Knob	Trinity Park	Trinity Beach	Kewarra Beach	Clifton Beach	Palm Cove
School Park	San Remo Park	Morabito Park	Centaur Park	Bowline Close Park	James Cook Drive Reserve	Charles Todd Park	Macarthur Close Reserve
Keith Edwick Park	Tamarind Reserve	Haling Park	Icefire Quay Reserve	Anchor Close Park	Lilium Court Park	Evergreen Park	Tom Mcdonald Park
O'Shea Esplanade Reserve	Raintree Park	Caddy Reserve	Norwood Crescent Park	Navigation Drive Park	Paradise Gardens Park	Edward Mann Park	Sanctuary Close Park
	Syd and Jane Granville Park	Best Street Reserve	Harbour Drive Reserve	Manus Street Park	Green Avenue Park	Saxon Park North & South	Williams Esplanade Reserve
	Fred Hessels Park	Old School Park	Apollo Quay Park	Coastwatcher Park	Bronte Close Park	Silver Crescent Park	Goldfinch Park
	Permanently Closed]	Yorkeys Knob Foreshore Park	David Trego Williams Park	Possum Street Park	Kookaburra Park West		
	Holloways Beach Esplanade Reserve	Ray Howarth Park	George Pullar Park	Trinity Beach Foreshore	Crocodile Park		
			Marina Quay Park	Strombus Avenue Reserve	Kookaburra Park		
			Tudor Park	Centenary Park	Strombus Avenue Reserve		
			Krait Reserve	George Moore Park	Curlew Park		
			Bataan Street Park		Pelican Park Esplanade Reserve		

== Retail ==
Retail and service activity in the Northern Beaches is primarily local in scale and distributed across the region's suburbs. Each suburb contains a combination of small shopping centres, convenience stores, and service businesses.

== Healthcare ==
Healthcare in the Northern Beaches is provided primarily through general medical practices, dental clinics, and allied health services located in several suburbs of the region. Some suburbs, including Machans Beach and Holloways Beach, do not contain medical facilities within their boundaries, and residents typically access healthcare services in nearby suburbs or in Cairns city.
