= City of Cairns =

Coordinates: 16°55′49″S 145°46′11″E

- Local government area
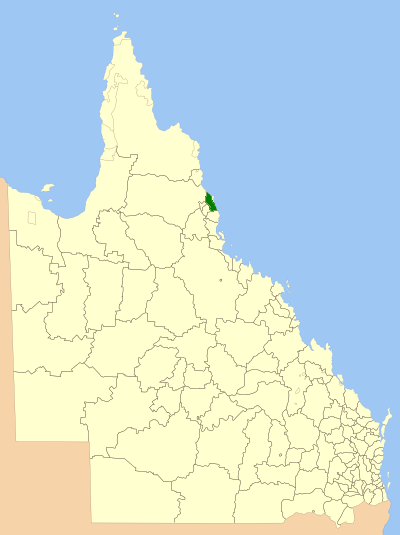
- Location within Queensland

- Country: Australia
- State: Queensland
- Region: Far North Queensland
- Established: 1885
- Council seat: Cairns City

Area
  - Total: 1,691.4 km^{2} (653.1 sq mi)

Population
  - Total: 156,169 (2011)
  - Density: 92.3312/km^{2} (239.137/sq mi)
- Website: City of Cairns
LGAs around City of Cairns
| Mareeba | Coral Sea | Coral Sea |
| Atherton | City of Cairns | Yarrabah |
| Eacham | Johnstone | Coral Sea |

The City of Cairns was a local government area centred on the Far North Queensland city of Cairns. Established in 1885, for most of its existence it consisted of approximately 51.5 square kilometres (19.9 sq mi) around Cairns itself, with much of the metropolitan area being located in the Shire of Mulgrave. The Shire amalgamated into the city on 22 March 1995, as did small sections of neighbouring shires.

In 2008, the City amalgamated with the Shire of Douglas to become the Cairns Region.

== History ==
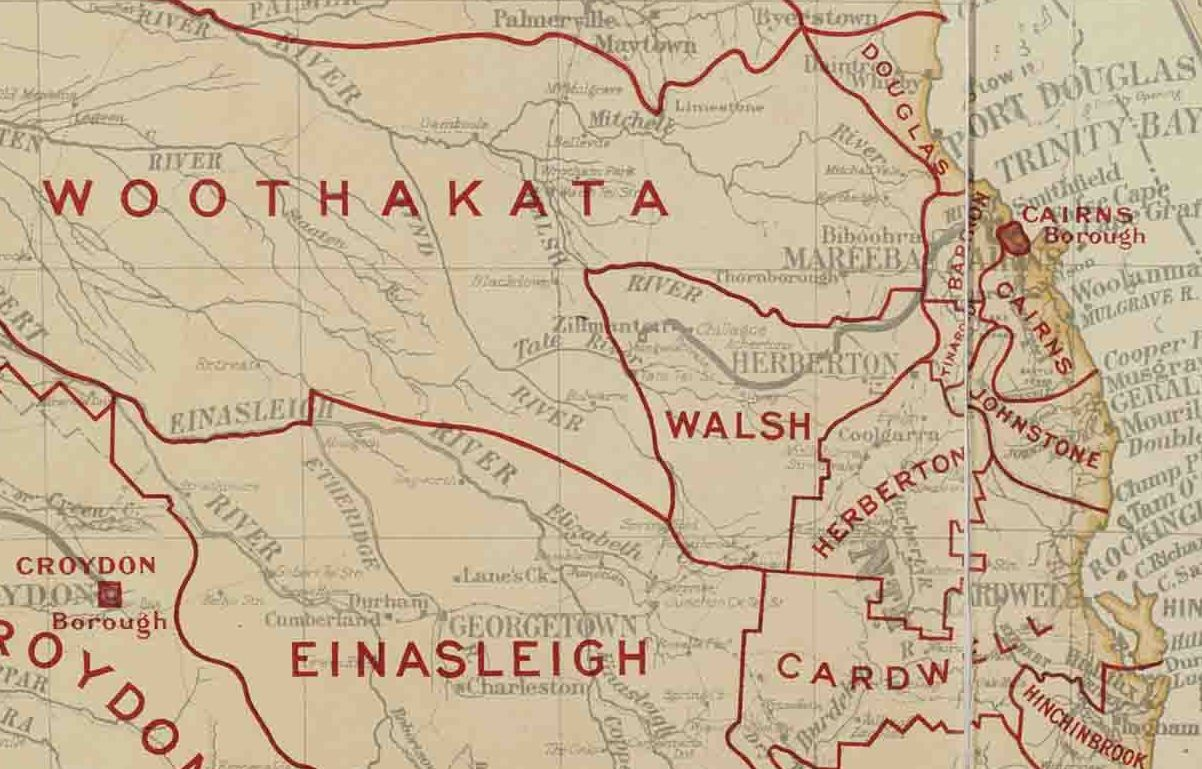
Map of the Cairns Division and Cairns Municipality and adjacent local government areas, March 1902

Following a petition by local residents, on 28 May 1885, the Borough of Cairns was established under the Local Government Act 1878, being excised from the Cairns Division.

With the passage of the Local Authorities Act 1902, the Borough of Cairns became the Town of Cairns on 31 March 1903.

On 12 October 1923, the Town of Cairns was proclaimed City of Cairns.

On 21 November 1991, the Electoral and Administrative Review Commission, created two years earlier, produced its second report, and recommended that local government boundaries in the Cairns area be rationalised, and that the Shire of Mulgrave be dissolved and amalgamated with the City of Cairns. The Shire at that stage had a population of 54,783 (1991) while the city had 49,361. Both authorities had chambers in the Cairns CBD. The old City Council chambers were located on Abbott Street, and have since been converted into a city library. The old Mulgrave Shire Chambers were located on Cairns Esplanade.

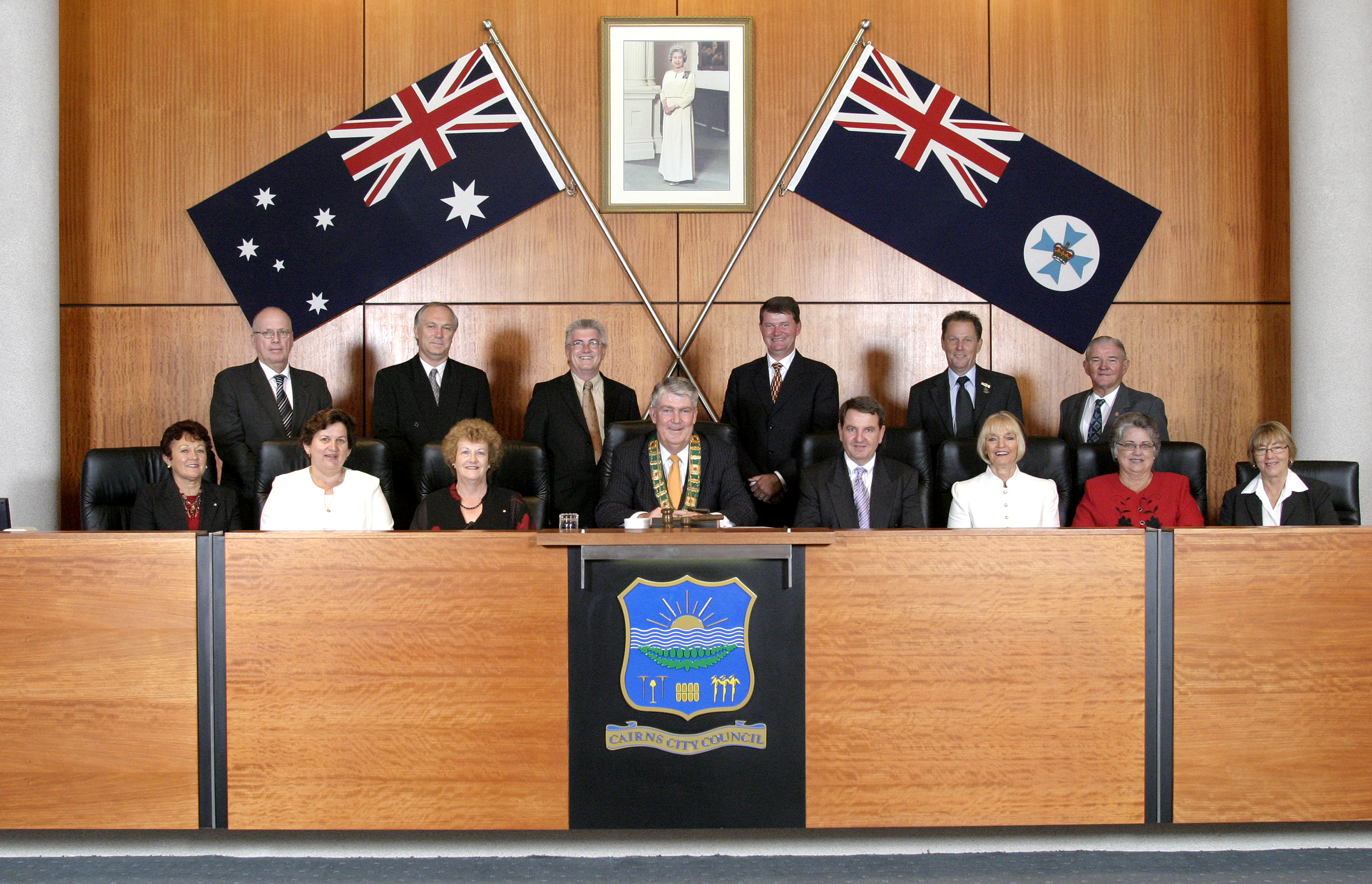
Council Members of 2004–2008

The Local Government (Cairns, Douglas, Mareeba and Mulgrave) Regulation 1994 was gazetted on 16 December 1994, additionally mandating that small sections of the Shire of Mareeba around Redlynch and Barron Gorge and Ellis Beach in the Shire of Douglas also be amalgamated. It further specified that the new Council would have an elected mayor and 12 councillors each representing one of 12 divisions.

On 22 March 1995, the new City came into existence, and Tom Pyne, previously the Chairman of the Mulgrave shire council, was elected as its first mayor. He retired in 2000, and Kevin Byrne of the Cairns Unity grouping served two full terms until the council's dissolution in 2008. In a controversial decision, new council chambers were constructed on previously industrial contaminated land in the mainly industrial suburb of Portsmith.

On 15 March 2008, under the Local Government (Reform Implementation) Act 2007 passed by the Parliament of Queensland on 10 August 2007, the City of Cairns merged with the Shire of Douglas to form the Cairns Region. Byrne was narrowly defeated by Val Schier of Cairns 1st for the mayoralty of the new Regional Council.

In 2012, a proposal was made to de-amalgamate the Shire of Douglas from the Cairns Region. On 6 December 2012, the Queensland Minister for Local Government, the Hon. David Crisafulli, granted the people of the former Douglas Shire a vote on possible de-amalgamation from the Cairns Regional Council, even though the Queensland Treasury Corporation had calculated the costs to be too high a burden on the few ratepayers of this small shire, and the shire to be unviable in the long term. Despite strong opposition from many parties, on 9 March 2013 the citizens of the former Douglas shire voted in a referendum to de-amalgamate. As of 1 January 2014 Douglas Shire is no longer part of the Cairns Regional Council.

== Suburbs and localities ==
The City of Cairns included the following settlements:

Cairns Central area:

- Aeroglen
- Bungalow
- Cairns City
- Cairns North
- Earlville
- Edge Hill
- Kanimbla
- Manoora
- Manunda
- Mooroobool
- Parramatta Park
- Portsmith
- Westcourt
- Whitfield

Northern Mulgrave area:

- Barron
- Barron Gorge
- Brinsmead
- Buchan Point
- Caravonica
- Clifton Beach
- Ellis Beach
- Freshwater
- Holloways Beach
- Kamerunga
- Kewarra Beach
- Lamb Range
- Macalister Range
- Machans Beach
- Palm Cove
- Redlynch
- Smithfield
- Stratford
- Trinity Beach
- Trinity Park
- Yorkeys Knob

Southern Mulgrave area:

- Aloomba
- Babinda
- Bartle Frere
- Bayview Heights
- Bellenden Ker
- Bentley Park
- Bramston Beach
- Deeral
- East Russell
- East Trinity
- Edmonton
- Eubenangee^{1}
- Fishery Falls
- Fitzroy Island
- Glen Boughton
- Goldsborough
- Gordonvale
- Green Hill
- Green Island
- Kamma
- Little Mulgrave
- Meringa
- Miriwinni
- Mount Peter
- Mount Sheridan
- Ngatjan^{1}
- Packers Camp
- Waugh Pocket
- White Rock^{2}
- Woopen Creek
- Wooroonooran^{3}
- Woree
- Wrights Creek

^{1} – shared with Cassowary Coast Region
^{2} – not to be confused with White Rock in City of Ipswich
^{3} – shared with shared with Cassowary Coast Region and Tablelands Region

== Population ==
| Year | Cairns (C) | Mulgrave (S) |
|---|---|---|
| 1933 | 11,993 | 10,303 |
| 1947 | 16,644 | 10,485 |
| 1954 | 21,020 | 13,477 |
| 1961 | 25,204 | 14,427 |
| 1966 | 26,696 | 15,312 |
| 1971 | 30,288 | 16,985 |
| 1976 | 34,857 | 23,025 |
| 1981 | 39,096 | 31,335 |
| 1986 | 42,227 | 41,711 |
| 1991 | 49,361 | 54,783 |
| 1996 | 116,718 | |
| 2001 | 119,937 | |
| 2006 | 136,460 | |
| 2011 | 156,169 | |
| 2021 | 166,943 | |
