= Shire of Mulgrave (Queensland) =

Coordinates: 16°55′26.8″S 145°46′28″E

- Local government area
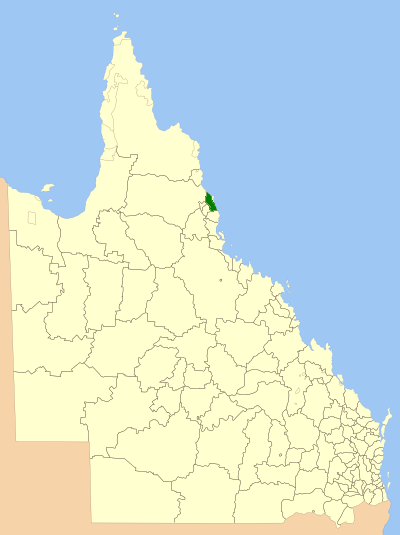
- Location within Queensland
- Country: Australia
- State: Queensland
- Region: Far North Queensland
- Established: 1879
- Abolished: 1995
- Council seat: Cairns

Area
  - Total: 1,718.3 km^{2} (663.4 sq mi)

Population
  - Total: 54,783 (1991 census)
  - Density: 31.8821/km^{2} (82.5742/sq mi)
LGAs around Shire of Mulgrave
Mareeba	Coral Sea	Coral Sea
Atherton	Shire of Mulgrave	Yarrabah
Eacham	Johnstone	Coral Sea

The Shire of Mulgrave was a local government area surrounding the City of Cairns in the Far North region of Queensland. The shire, administered from Cairns, covered an area of 1,718.3 square kilometres (663.4 sq mi); it existed as a local government entity from 1879 until 1995, when it was dissolved and amalgamated into the City of Cairns.

== History ==
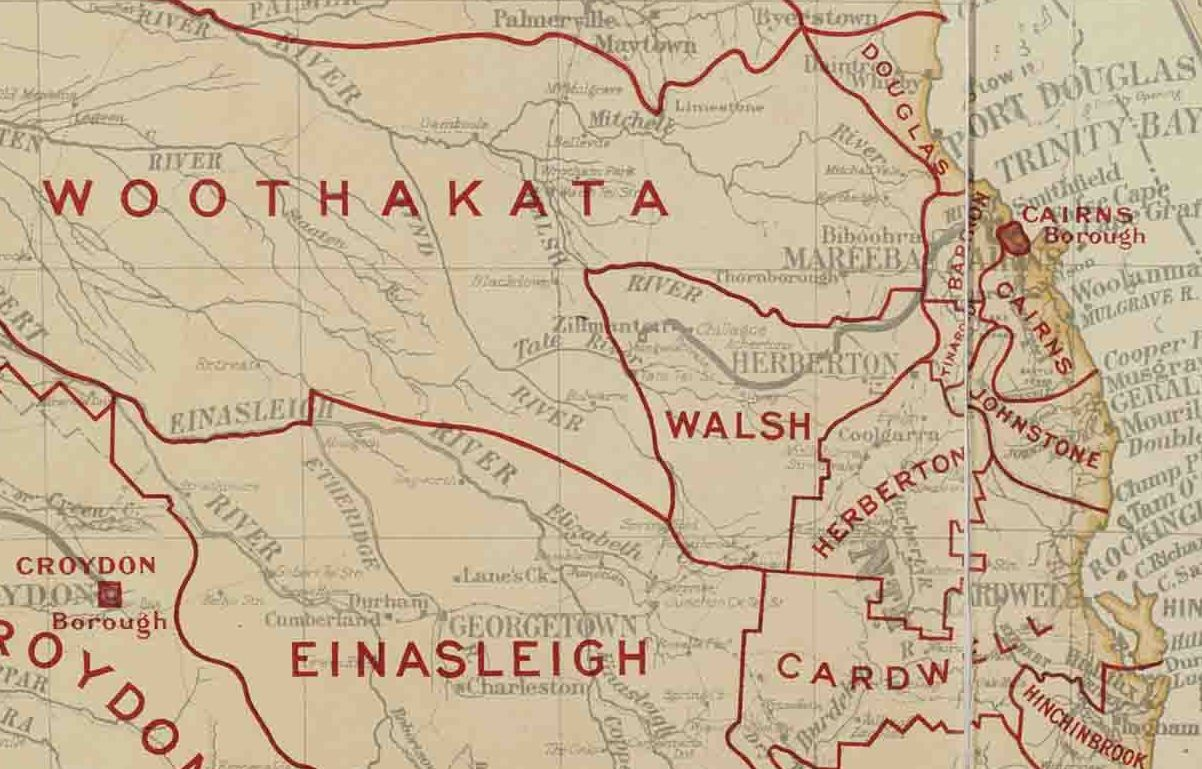
Map of the Cairns Division and Cairns Municipality and adjacent local government areas, March 1902

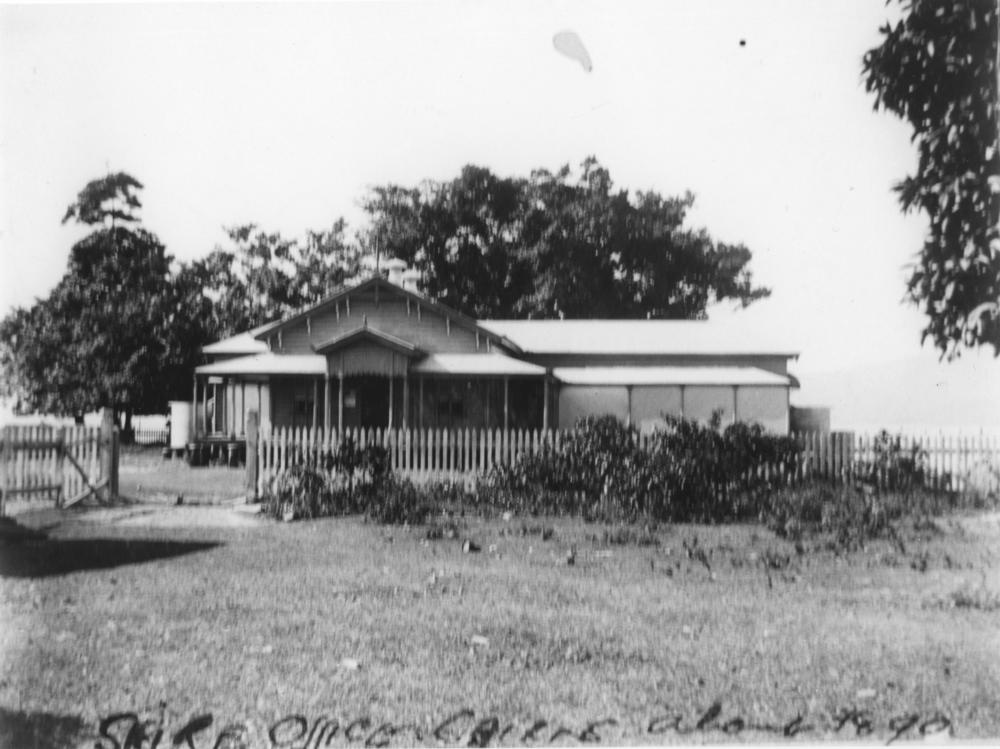
Chambers of the Cairns Divisional Board, circa 1890

The Cairns Division was created on 11 November 1879 as one of 74 divisions around Queensland under the Divisional Boards Act 1879 with a population of 34.

On 3 June 1880, part of the Cairns Division was separated to create the Douglas Division.

On 3 September 1881, the Tinaroo Division was created on 3 September 1881 under the Divisional Boards Act 1879 out of parts of the Cairns, Hinchinbrook and Woothakata Divisions.

Following a petition by local residents, on 28 May 1885, the Borough of Cairns was established under the Local Government Act 1878, being excised from the Cairns Division.

With the passage of the Local Authorities Act 1902, the Cairns Division became the Shire of Cairns on 31 March 1903. Originally based in the town of Gordonvale, which historically was called Mulgrave, its offices were located at Cairns Esplanade, Cairns.

On 20 December 1919, the Shire absorbed territory from the abolished Shire of Barron, which was divided between the Shires of Cairns and Shire of Woothakata.

On 16 November 1940, the Shire of Cairns was renamed Shire of Mulgrave.

The character of the Shire changed over time, and by the time of the 1991 census, 88% of the Shire's population resided within Cairns's metropolitan area. On 21 November 1991, the Electoral and Administrative Review Commission, created two years earlier, produced its second report, and recommended that local government boundaries in the Cairns area be rationalised, and that the Shire of Mulgrave be abolished and absorbed into the City of Cairns. The Local Government (Cairns, Douglas, Mareeba and Mulgrave) Regulation 1994 was gazetted on 16 December 1994. On 22 March 1995, the Shire was abolished and became part of the new City of Cairns.

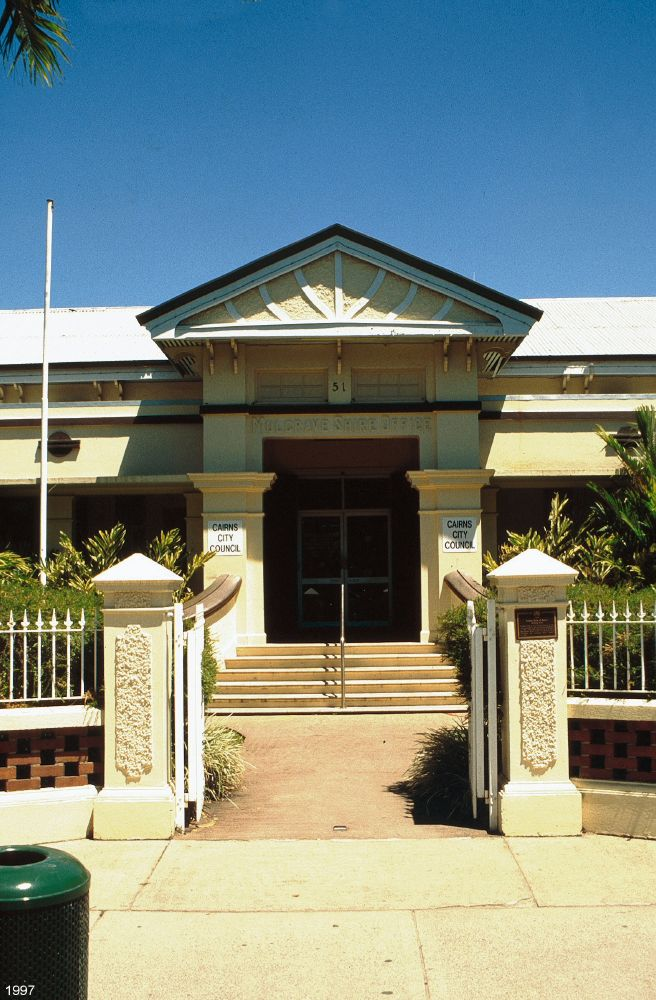
Mulgrave Shire Council Chambers (also known as Cairns Shire Offices), The Esplanade, Cairns

The Mulgrave Shire Council Chambers were listed on the Queensland Heritage Register on 6 January 1999. It was used as the Cairns & Tropical North Visitor Information Centre from 2016 to 2023. The building has since been renovated and incorporated into the Cairns Gallery Precinct.

== Towns and localities ==
The Shire of Mulgrave included the following settlements:

Northern Mulgrave area:

- Barron
- Barron Gorge
- Brinsmead
- Buchan Point
- Caravonica
- Clifton Beach
- Ellis Beach
- Freshwater
- Holloways Beach
- Kamerunga
- Kewarra Beach
- Lamb Range
- Macalister Range
- Machans Beach
- Palm Cove
- Redlynch
- Smithfield
- Stratford
- Trinity Beach
- Trinity Park
- Yorkeys Knob

Southern Mulgrave area:

- Aloomba
- Babinda
- Bartle Frere
- Bayview Heights
- Bellenden Ker
- Bentley Park
- Bramston Beach
- Deeral
- East Russell
- East Trinity
- Edmonton
- Eubenangee^{1}
- Fishery Falls
- Fitzroy Island
- Glen Boughton
- Goldsborough
- Gordonvale
- Green Hill
- Green Island
- Kamma
- Little Mulgrave
- Meringa
- Miriwinni
- Mount Peter
- Mount Sheridan
- Ngatjan^{1}
- Packers Camp
- Waugh Pocket
- White Rock^{2}
- Woopen Creek
- Wooroonooran^{3}
- Woree
- Wrights Creek

^{1} - shared with Cassowary Coast Region
^{2} - not to be confused with White Rock in City of Ipswich
^{3} - shared with shared with Cassowary Coast Region and Tablelands Region

== Population ==
Year	Population
1933	10,303
1947	10,485
1954	13,477
1961	14,427
1966	15,312
1971	16,985
1976	23,025
1981	31,335
1986	41,711
1991	54,783

== Chairmen ==
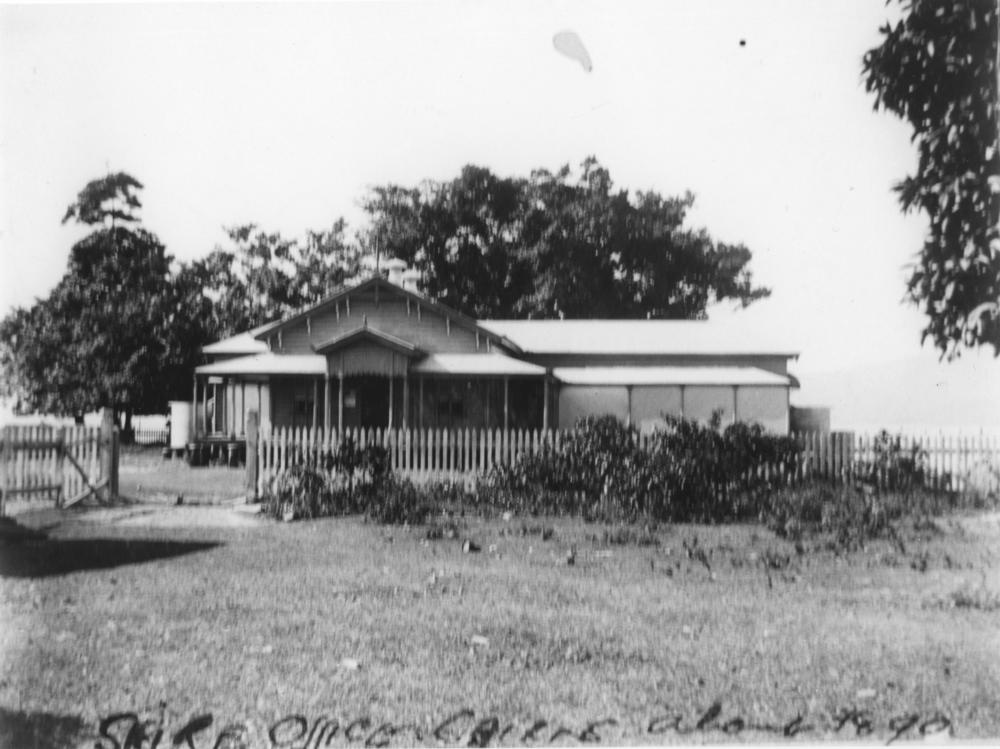
Chambers of the Cairns Divisional Board, ca. 1890

=== Cairns Division (1880–1903) ===
The chairmen of the Cairns Division were:

Chairman	Term
Simon Louis Loeven	1880–1881
William Peter Redden	1882
Archibald Meston	1883–1884
Richard Ash Kingsford^{[1]}	1885
Jean Baptiste Loridan	1885
Hamilton Thorncliffe S. Douglas	1885–1886
James Kenny	1887–1888
Thomas Mackay	1889
Richard A. Tills	1890
James Kenny	1891–1892
William Henry Swallow	1893–1897
William John Munro	1898–1902

^{1} Richard Kingsford left to become Mayor of the newly formed Borough of Cairns in 1885.

=== Shire of Cairns (1903–1940) ===
Chairmen of the Shire of Cairns were:

Chairman	Term
William John Munro	1902–1911
George Russell Mayers	1912–1918
Seymour Herbert Warner	1919–1929
Wilfrid Simmonds	1930–1935
John Albert Martin	1936–1940

=== Shire of Mulgrave (1940–1995) ===
The chairmen of the Shire of Mulgrave were:

Chairman	Term
John Albert Martin	1940–1941
Jim P. Tully	1941–1944
William Charles (Bill) Griffin	1944–1951
Charles E. Campbell	1952–1963
George Kenneth Alley	1964–1979
Thomas Alfred Pyne	1979–1995

== Notable people ==
In addition to the chairmen, other notable people associated with the shire include:

- Bunny Adair, Member of the Queensland Legislative Assembly for Cook who was a Mulgrave Shire councillor from 1939 to 1946
