= Mulgrave Shire Council Chambers =

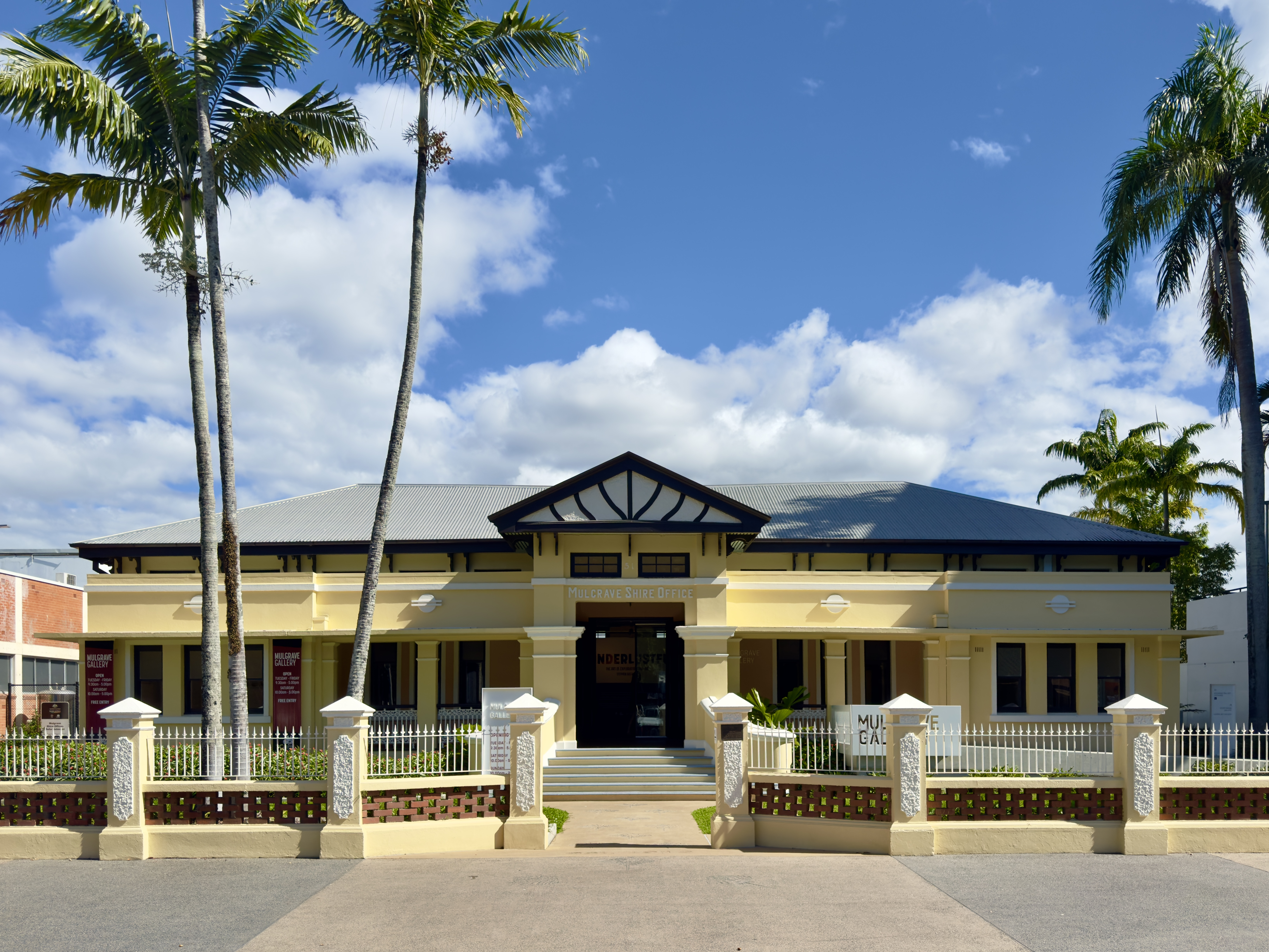
- Mulgrave Shire Council Chambers, 2025

- Location within Queensland Location within Australia
- 16.9215°S 145.7783°E
- Location: 51 The Esplanade, Cairns City, Cairns, Cairns Region, Queensland, Australia

History
- Design period: 1900–1914 (early 20th century)
- Built: 1912–1913
- Built for: Mulgrave Shire Council

Site notes
- Architect(s): Charles Dalton Lynch & Walter Hunt
- Architectural style: Classicism

Queensland Heritage Register
- Official name: Mulgrave Shire Council Chambers (former), Cairns Shire Offices
- Type: state heritage (landscape, built)
- Designated: 6 January 1999
- Reference no.: 601913
- Significant period: 1910s, 1940s, 1990s (historical); 1912–ongoing (social); 1910s (fabric)
- Significant components: strong room, office/s, garden/grounds, fence/wall – perimeter, foyer – entrance, visitor's area, furniture/fittings, views to, council chamber/meeting room
- Builders: Wilson & Baillie

Mulgrave Shire Council Chambers is a heritage-listed former town hall at 51 The Esplanade, Cairns City, Cairns, Cairns Region, Queensland, Australia. It was designed by Charles Dalton Lynch & Walter Hunt and built from 1912 to 1913 by Wilson & Baillie. It is also known as Cairns Shire Offices. It was added to the Queensland Heritage Register on 6 January 1999.

== History ==
The former Mulgrave Shire Council Chambers, constructed in 1912–1913, is a single-storeyed masonry structure located fronting the Esplanade to the northeast. The structure was erected during a period of considerable building activity in Cairns, which occurred in the years immediately preceding the First World War.

Cairns was established officially in October 1876 as a port to service the newly discovered Hodgkinson goldfields. In this first phase of Cairns' development there was a small flurry of building activity (mostly shanties and tent houses), but the town competed with both Cooktown and Port Douglas for the Hodgkinson trade, and made little progress until the establishment of a local sugar industry and the opening up of the Atherton Tablelands' mineral fields, in the early 1880s. The 1885 announcement that Cairns was to be the terminus for the Herberton railway established the town as the principal port in the region. These events boosted the local economy in the 1880s and generated a second building and development phase, during which the early temporary structures were replaced by more substantial timber buildings. A number of masonry and reinforced concrete public and commercial buildings were erected in Cairns in the years immediately preceding the First World War. Some of these buildings replaced earlier timber structures which were by that time in a poor condition. The third major phase of Cairns' development occurred between the First and Second World Wars, at which time the city's status as the principal port of Far North Queensland was consolidated and the city centre virtually re-built.

The Cairns Divisional Board was established in 1879 by the Divisional Boards Act of that year, which brought local government to the whole of the colony, and the divisions were mostly based on existing census districts. The Divisional board had its precursors in the forms of the Road Board, which was established to advise on the allocation of government funds for roads in the region, and the Cairns Progress Association. The first meetings were held in Port Douglas, but were not suitable for Cairns residents to attend. The divisional boundaries were redrawn a number of times, and a new Cairns Divisional Board met in Cairns in mid 1880. As Cairns developed in the early 1880s, dissatisfaction grew with the Cairns Divisional Board which was perceived to be more interested in the affairs of the country areas than of the town. Separation of the town from the division was achieved in 1885 when the Cairns Municipal Council was established to administer the town area.

The Cairns Divisional Board continued to operate out of its offices, which was constructed on a reserve gazetted for Divisional Board Offices, in the government precinct between Spence and Shields Streets, even though it was strictly outside of its municipal boundaries. The Cairns Divisional Board became the Cairns Shire Council c.1905 and then renamed the Mulgrave Shire Council in 1940.

The Cairns Municipal Council became the Cairns Town Council in March 1903, which in turn became the Cairns City Council in October 1923. The former Cairns City Council and the Mulgrave Shire Council were amalgamated in March 1995, becoming the current Cairns City Council.

The former Mulgrave Shire Council Chambers, originally named the Cairns Shire Offices, was constructed in 1912–1913, replacing an earlier timber structure. The building was designed by the North Queensland architectural partnership of Charles Lynch and Walter Hunt, a practice which had offices in Cairns and Townsville, as well as other regional centres, from 1911 to 1921. The building was one of the partnership's earliest commissions.

Prior to forming a partnership with Walter Hunt, Charles Lynch had been a partner in the Townsville practice of Tunbridge, Tunbridge and Lynch, from 1907 to 1910, which completed a number of projects in Cairns, including the Cairns School of Arts, Central Hotel, the Harbour Board Offices, and the rebuilding of the Court House Hotel. After his partnership with Hunt dissolved in 1921, Lynch practiced as an architect in Townsville until 1937. Walter Hunt had practiced as an architect in Charters Towers from 1900 to 1910 prior to his partnership with Charles Lynch. After the partnership dissolved, Hunt practiced as an architect and surveyor in Townsville until 1931, and taught architecture at the Townsville Technical College from 1923.

The former Mulgrave Shire Council Chambers was constructed by builders Wilson and Baillie, and the successful tender (including the front fence) was £2,348. The building originally comprised a T-shaped plan, with verandahs to all sides, and with an entrance porch fronting the Esplanade.

The first major alterations and extensions were carried out in 1951–52, and the successful tenderer was Thomas Barry O'Meara and Sons at a cost of £5,993/15/0. These works consisted of the partial removal of verandahs, additions to both sides of the building with the extension of the existing roof form, new toilets, alterations to the front elevation, and alterations to the interior.

Further alterations were carried out in 1965–1966, and the successful tenderer was Del Ben and Company at a cost of £14,871. The works comprised the removal of the remaining side verandahs, additions at the rear of the side wings, internal alterations, suspended ceiling installed to the reception area, alterations to the toilets, and air conditioning to some rooms. Further internal alterations have occurred after this time.

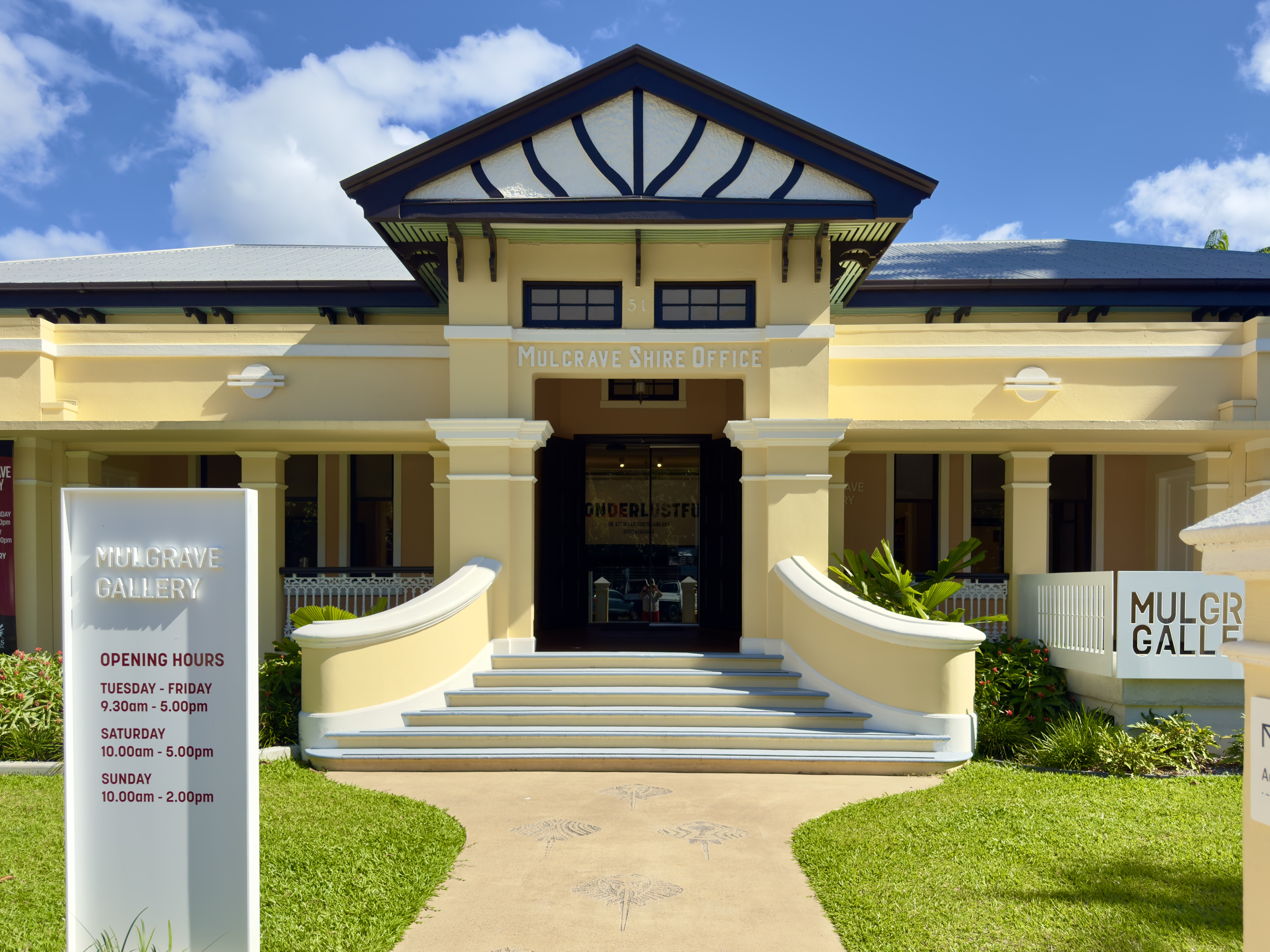
Mulgrave Gallery, formerly Mulgrave Shire Council Chambers

The building was used as the Cairns & Tropical North Visitor Information Centre until its closure in 2018.

In August 2024 the building was open as the Mulgrave Gallery.

== Description ==
The former Mulgrave Shire Council Chambers, a single-storeyed rendered masonry structure with a hipped corrugated iron roof, is located fronting the Esplanade to the northeast. A three-storeyed structure, which is not included in the heritage listing boundary for this place, is built adjacent to the southeast and southwest sides of the building.

The symmetrical northeast elevation has a central entry with projecting gable flanked by two bays of verandahs to either side. The roof has battened eaves with paired timber brackets, and multi-paned clerestory windows are located below the eaves and above the verandah awning. The projecting gable has roughcast finish with curved timber framing in relief, and is supported by corner pilasters with expressed cornice at the verandah eave level. The name MULGRAVE SHIRE OFFICE is in relief to the lintel above the entry, above which are paired multi-paned clerestory windows. The entrance is accessed via a set of steps with curved rendered masonry balustrades. The original verandah has been replaced (as part of the 1951–52 works) with rendered masonry columns supporting a rendered masonry parapet and cantilevered concrete sunhood. The parapet has relief detailing, including a stylised circular motif, and the columns have expressed cornices at the eave level. The cast iron balustrades from the original verandah are intact, and the entrance leads into a recessed vestibule with paired aluminium framed doors accessing the customer service area. Tall narrow windows open onto the verandah either side of the central entrance.

The verandahs are flanked by a slightly projecting bay at either end, which formed part of the 1951–1952 extensions. Each bay has three narrow windows, unified by a common sill and cantilevered concrete sunhood.

The southeast and southwest elevations are mostly obscured by the adjoining building, which is constructed almost abutting the eaves. The southeast elevation comprises the 1951–52 additions at the eastern end, and the 1965–66 additions at the rear with a recessed entrance between. These additions have narrow windows with expressed mouldings, the rear addition has a low pitch ribbed metal roof concealed behind a parapet, and the recessed entrance aligns with the position of the original verandah. The original verandah has been removed from the southwest rear elevation, and the paired timber doors from the original board room now front a covered carpark under the adjoining building. The northwest elevation comprises the 1951–52 additions at the eastern end, with the 1965–66 additions at the rear which extend out from the building to the north. These additions have narrow windows with expressed mouldings, and the rear addition has a low pitch ribbed metal roof concealed behind a parapet.

Internally, the building has suspended ceilings to several areas, with non-original partitions and fittings. The customer service and general office area has early, and some original, details including wide cornices, clerestory windows, architraves, picture rails and skirtings. An early strong room is located in each of the rear corners, and each strong room has a ladder which access a storage area above. A partition divides the rear of the room, and another earlier partition is located across the original board room which has some original surviving details. The rear corridors between the original section of the building and the later extensions are in the position of the original rear verandahs. The later extensions have internal partitions and sheeted walls and ceilings.

The original fence fronting the Esplanade survives, and comprises rendered pillars with pyramid capitals and roughcast side panels, between which are sections of cast iron palisade on a hit-and-miss brick base. Non-original gates have been installed to both the pedestrian and driveway entrances The front garden contains several mature palms.

== Heritage listing ==
The former Mulgrave Shire Council Chambers was listed on the Queensland Heritage Register on 6 January 1999 having satisfied the following criteria.

The place is important in demonstrating the evolution or pattern of Queensland's history.

The former Mulgrave Shire Council Chambers survives as an important illustration of the growth of Cairns and the former Cairns Shire in the years preceding the First World War. In particular, the place illustrates the local community's confidence in Cairns and the surrounding shire emerging as an important regional centre. The site has sustained a continued local government presence in Cairns since the early 1880s, when the Reserve for Divisional Board Offices was gazetted and the first offices constructed.

The place is important in demonstrating the principal characteristics of a particular class of cultural places.

Although the building has had two major extensions, the original form is clearly evident and it is a good example of an early twentieth century council chambers.

The place is important because of its aesthetic significance.

The former Mulgrave Shire Council Chambers has considerable aesthetic significance, and together with its fencing and mature plantings, makes a considerable contribution to the Esplanade streetscape and Cairns townscape.

The place has a strong or special association with a particular community or cultural group for social, cultural or spiritual reasons.

The former Mulgrave Shire Council Chambers contributes markedly to the city's sense of identity and history.

The place has a special association with the life or work of a particular person, group or organisation of importance in Queensland's history.

The building has a strong association with the Cairns City Council and the Cairns community, and is illustrative of the development of local government in the region.
