= Palm Cove, Queensland =

Palm Cove
- Suburb
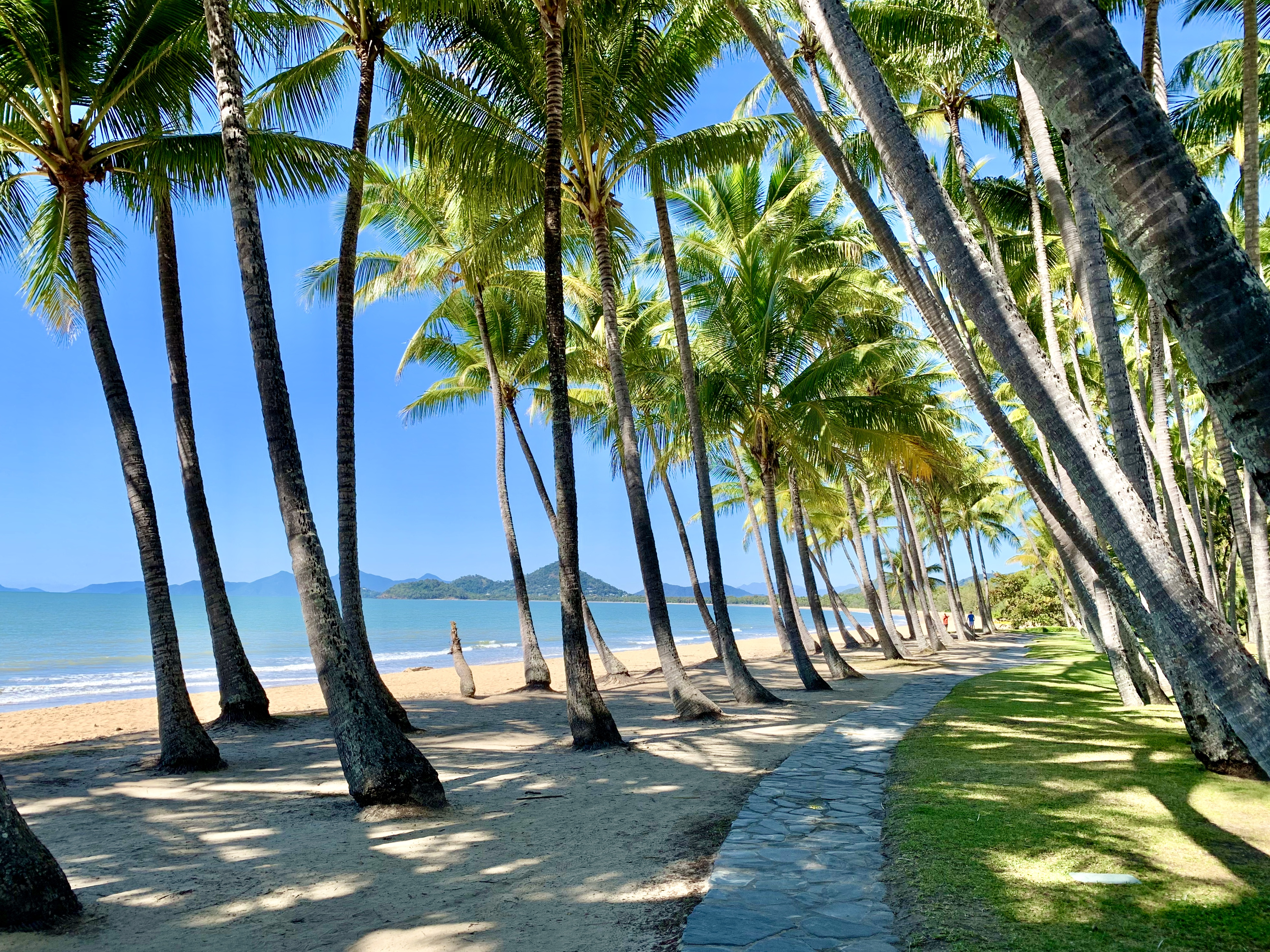
- Palm trees at Palm Cove Beach, 2020

- Interactive map of Palm Cove
- Coordinates: 16.7469°S 145.6658°E
- Country: Australia
- State: Queensland
- City: Cairns
- LGA: Cairns Region
- Location: 25.4 km (15.8 mi) NNW of Cairns CBD; 370 km (230 mi) NNW of Townsville; 1,702 km (1,058 mi) NNW of Brisbane

Government
  - State electorate: Cook
  - Federal division: Leichhardt

Area
  - Total: 6.8 km^{2} (2.6 sq mi)

Population
  - Total: 2,450 (2021 census)
  - Density: 360/km^{2} (933/sq mi)
- Time zone: UTC+10:00 (AEST)
- Postcode: 4879
Suburbs around Palm Cove
Ellis Beach	Ellis Beach	Coral Sea
Macalister Range	Palm Cove	Coral Sea
Macalister Range	Clifton Beach	Clifton Beach

Palm Cove is a suburb of Cairns in the Cairns Region, Queensland, Australia. In the 2021 census, Palm Cove had a population of 2,450 people.

It is named after the palm trees that line the beach.

== Geography ==
Palm Cove is located in Far North Queensland on the Australian coast. It has a long, sandy beach along most of its seafront except for the rocky headland around Buchan Point in the north of the suburb.

Arlington Reef is the closest section of The Great Barrier Reef to Palm Cove, located around 30 kilometres (19 mi) offshore. The reef shelters the inshore waters from the Coral Sea swells, creating relatively calm waters between the reef and the beach. To the west of Palm Cove is the Macalister Range National Park, which is part of the Wet Tropics World Heritage Area.

Since Palm Cove is located in a tropical climate, the average summer temperature is between 24 and 33 degrees Celsius; the average winter temperature is between 14 and 26 degrees Celsius.

Buchan is a town in the north of the locality (16.7433°S 145.6683°E). It was named in 1965 after Mount Buchan, which in turn was named by explorer George Elphinstone Dalrymple on 20 October 1873, after Buchan in Aberdeenshire, Scotland. The use of the name Buchan has fallen into disuse over the years.

== History ==
Palm Cove is situated in the Djabugay (Tjapukai) traditional Aboriginal country.

The first documented British visit to the area was by a coastal expedition led by George Elphinstone Dalrymple in 1873. Dalrymple's group had stopped in the area for a few days and accessed a large lagoon at Palm Cove. Immediately after landing, a large number of Aboriginal people came out of their camps and attempted to prevent the groups passage to the lagoon. Darlrymple's group used gunfire. Afterward, all of the group "heartily rejoiced at the severe lesson which their unwarrantable hostility had brought upon them".

Shortly before World War I in 1918, the land that is today Palm Cove was bought by Albert Veivers from Archdeacon Campbell. Archdeacon Campbell had been known as a priest at Cairns church who experimented with bringing different agricultural crops to the Cairns region. Veivers was important in the advancement of Palm Cove by having the first road built. The creation of the road led property values in Palm Cove to increase dramatically, leading to more prosperity for the community.

Shortly after World War II, in which Palm Cove was used as a training base for Australian soldiers, the number of people travelling to Palm Cove greatly increased.

The opening of the Ramada Reef Resort in 1986 marked the first international hotel chain to be located in Palm Cove, and the area has continued to increase in national and international recognition ever since.

In 2024, Palm Cove was rated the number-one "Best Beach in the World" by Condé Nast Traveler, who described it as the "epitome of a tropical paradise".

== Demographics ==
In the 2006 census, Palm Cove had a population of 1,215 people.

In the 2016 census, Palm Cove had a population of 2,059 people.

In the 2021 census, Palm Cove had a population of 2,450 people. Consistent with its tourism industry, the top two sectors for employment were in accommodation and cafes/restaurants (total 15.4%), far higher than the Queensland average of 3.5% and the Australian average of 3.1% for the same sectors.

== Education ==
There are no schools in Palm Cove. The nearest government primary school is Trinity Beach State School in Trinity Beach to the south. The nearest government secondary school is Smithfield State High School in Smithfield to the south.

== Amenities ==
Due to the small size of Palm Cove and its tourism focus, the focus is on the provision of tourist services rather than household needs. There are three convenience stores, a post office, pharmacy and many cafes, bars and restaurants. There are also facilities for bicycle and scooter hire, as well as various watersports activities available. Several retailers provide an assortment of clothing, swimwear, resort-wear, giftware and accessories. The nearest shopping centre is at Clifton Beach.

Palm Cove is between the Northern Beaches Leisure Trail to the south and the Wangetti Trail to the north.

== Attractions ==
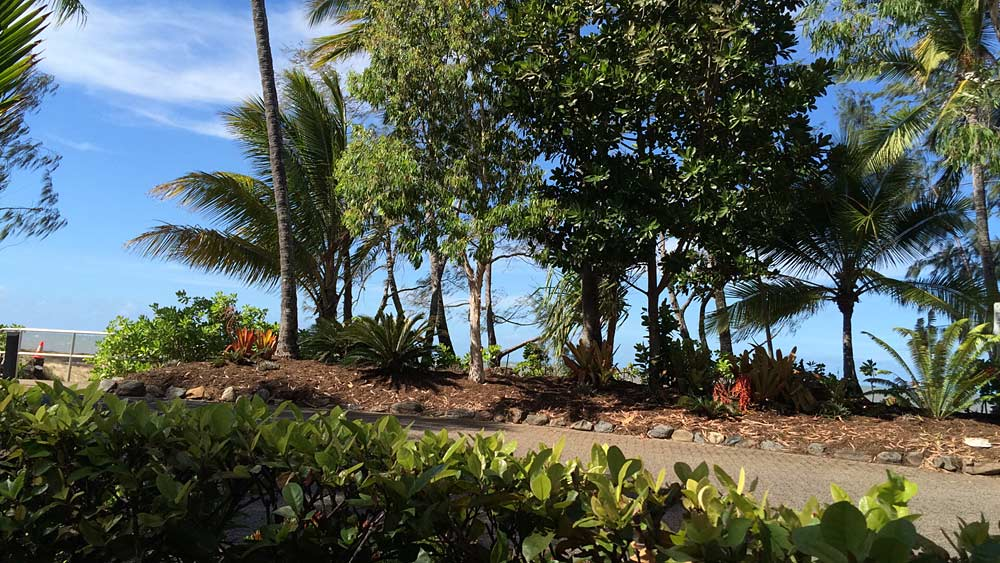
Jogger's track at William's Esplanade

Palm Cove is also a tourist destination due to its proximity to the Great Barrier Reef and the Daintree Rainforest. Palm Cove is the location of many resorts and apartments.. Over the last decade, Palm Cove has become the romance capitol of Australia with hundreds of couples coming for Palm Cove Weddings or to enjoy a relaxing honeymoon.

== Transport ==
The closest major airport to Palm Cove is the Cairns International Airport in Aeroglen to the south. The only method of direct transportation to Palm Cove is along the Captain Cook Highway which stretches from Cairns in the south to Mossman in the north. Buses also link Palm Cove to local suburbs.
