= Clifton Beach, Queensland =

Clifton Beach
- Suburb
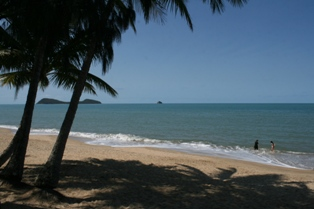
- Clifton Beach, 2013

- Coordinates: 16.7719°S 145.6683°E
- Country: Australia
- State: Queensland
- City: Cairns
- LGA(s): Cairns Region
- Location: 9.0 km (5.6 mi) N of Smithfield; 22.6 km (14.0 mi) NNW of Cairns CBD; 368 km (229 mi) NNW of Townsville; 1,716 km (1,066 mi) NNW of Brisbane

Government
  - State electorate(s): Barron River
  - Federal division(s): Leichhardt

Area
  - Total: 7.7 km^{2} (3.0 sq mi)

Population
  - Total(s): 3,192 (2021 census)
  - Density: 414.5/km^{2} (1,074/sq mi)
- Time zone: UTC+10:00 (AEST)
- Postcode: 4879
Suburbs around Clifton Beach
Macalister Range	Palm Cove	Coral Sea
Macalister Range	Clifton Beach	Coral Sea
Macalister Range	Kewarra Beach	Coral Sea

Clifton Beach is a coastal suburb in the Cairns Region, Queensland, Australia. In the 2021 census, Clifton Beach had a population of 3,192 people.

== Geography ==
Clifton Beach is located about 22 kilometres north of the city centre of Cairns on the Coral Sea. To the west, the mountains of the Macallister Range form the border with the Kuranda State Forest (→ Kuranda). The suburb of Kewarra Beach lies to the south and Palm Cove to the north. The Captain Cook Highway runs through the suburb.

To the east, the suburb is bordered by a long sandy beach, also known as Clifton Beach. The beach, which is affected by erosion, is not very wide, especially in the south, and is almost completely submerged at high tide. Rocky groynes protect it against erosion damage. It is only suitable for bathing to a limited extent, as it is often visited by crocodiles. In the first half of the calendar year, so-called "stinger" jellyfish also appear. Contact with their tentacles typically causes considerable pain and occasionally even danger to life. In the north of the beach there is a bathing facility protected by nets, which also offers sufficient protection from crocodiles. There are also some barbecue areas.

== History ==
Clifton Beach is situated in the Djabugay (Tjapukai) traditional Aboriginal country.

Sugar cane farmer William Fairweather laid out an access road to his farm. The Mulgrave Shire Council at the time named the area after the birthplace of his wife, who was from Clifton in the Darling Downs of southern Queensland. Alternatively, it is believed that the suburb was named after Clifton in Perthshire, Scotland, the birthplace of Mary Hunter Smart, a settler around 1880s.

Clifton Beach was officially declared a suburb on 2 May 1959.

In 1969, a post office was opened. In the 1970s, construction and road improvements began. By the 1980s, there were three trailer parks and a jellyfish-safe swimming facility. Clifton Beach was a mixture of residential and holiday resort with a rural atmosphere.

There are older houses and tourist facilities from this period on Arlington Esplanade running along the beach. A community centre was built a short distance back from the esplanade and local shops sold everyday goods, arts, and crafts. The Wild World Zoo, later called the Cairns Tropical Zoo, opened on the Captain Cook Highway and attracted traffic.

In the second half of the 1980s, the population increased by about two-thirds. Growth continued into the 2000s. A middle to upper class suburb emerged with many retirees. The area between the highway and the beach was almost entirely built up, while the other side of the highway, which borders the Kuranda State Forest and accounts for about two-thirds of Clifton Beach, remained largely undeveloped.

A shopping centre was built on Captain Cook Highway. A 2004 expansion added a supermarket operated by the national Coles chain.

== Demographics ==
In the 2016 census, Clifton Beach had a population of 3,146 people.

In the 2021 census, Clifton Beach had a population of 3,192 people.

== Education ==
There are no schools in Clifton Beach. The nearest government primary school is Trinity Beach State School in Trinity Beach to the south-east. The nearest government secondary school is Smithfield State High School in Smithfield to the south-east.

== Amenities ==
The post office is in the shopping centre, the Clifton Village Shopping Centre on Captain Cook Highway, which is accessible via Endeavour Road.

There are a number of parks in the suburb, including:

- Eddy Street Park (16.7645°S 145.6707°E)
- Edward Mann Park (16.7696°S 145.6761°E)

== Images ==
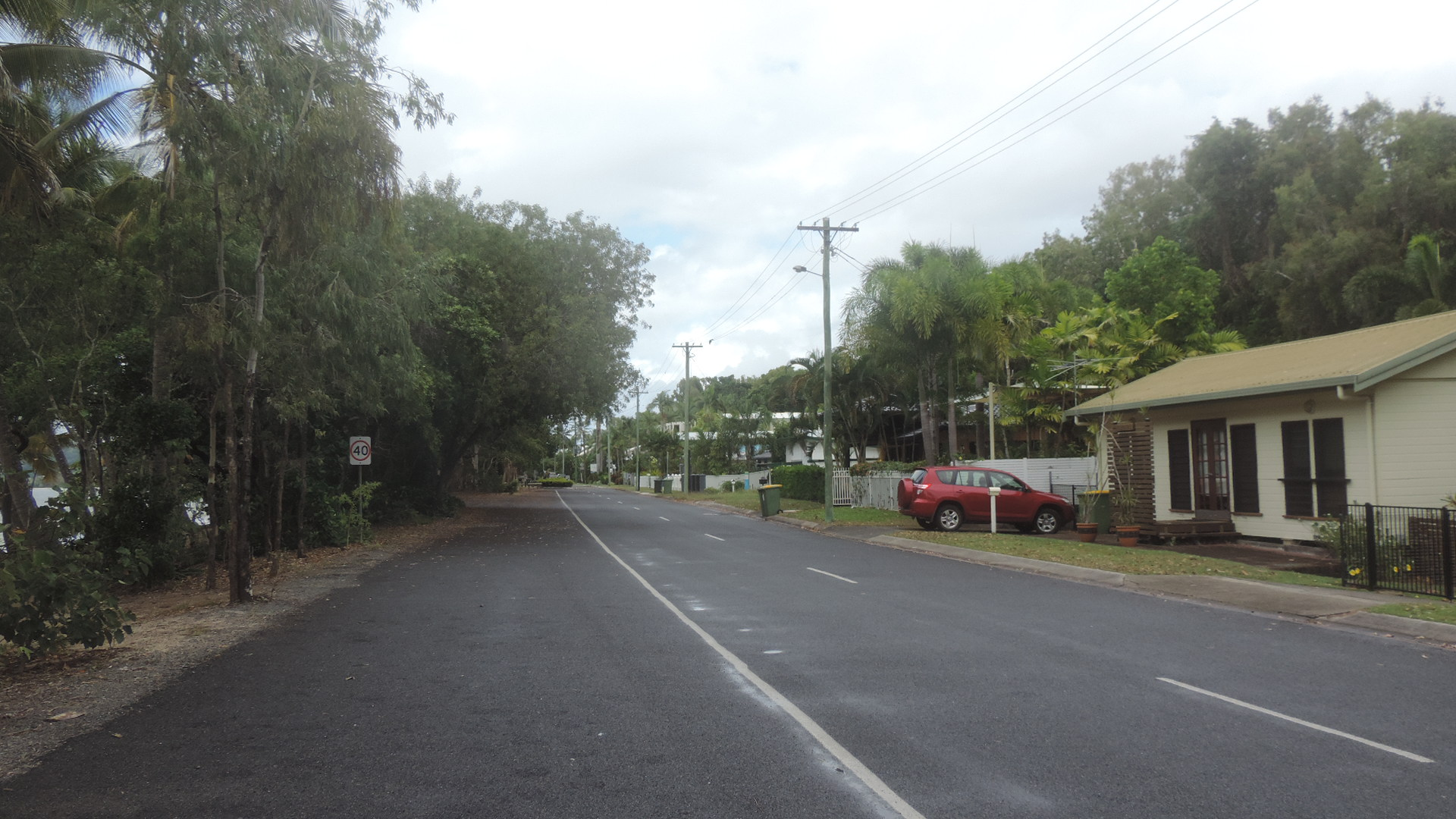
Arlington Esplanade, 2018

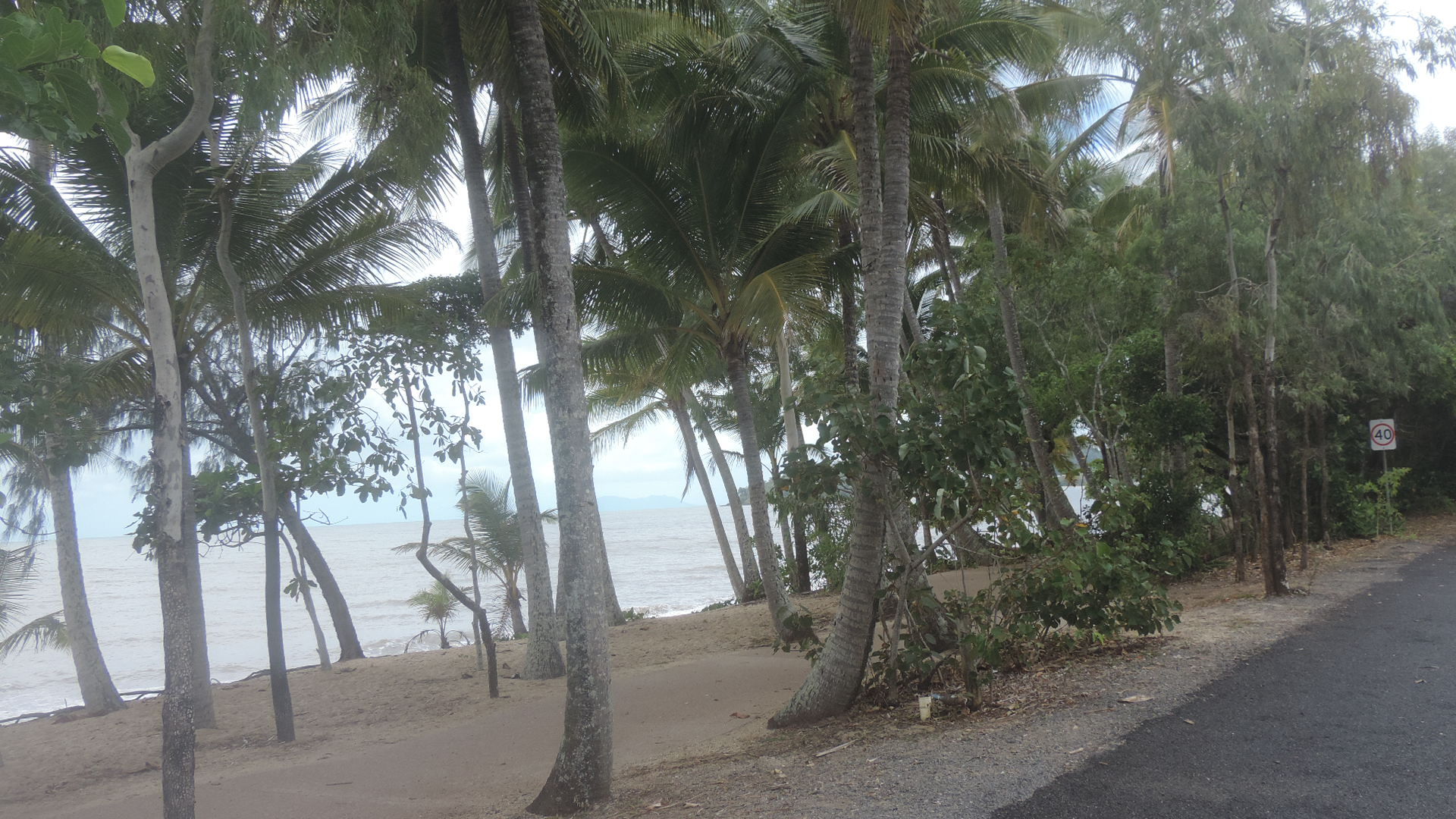
Arlington Esplanade with beach, 2018

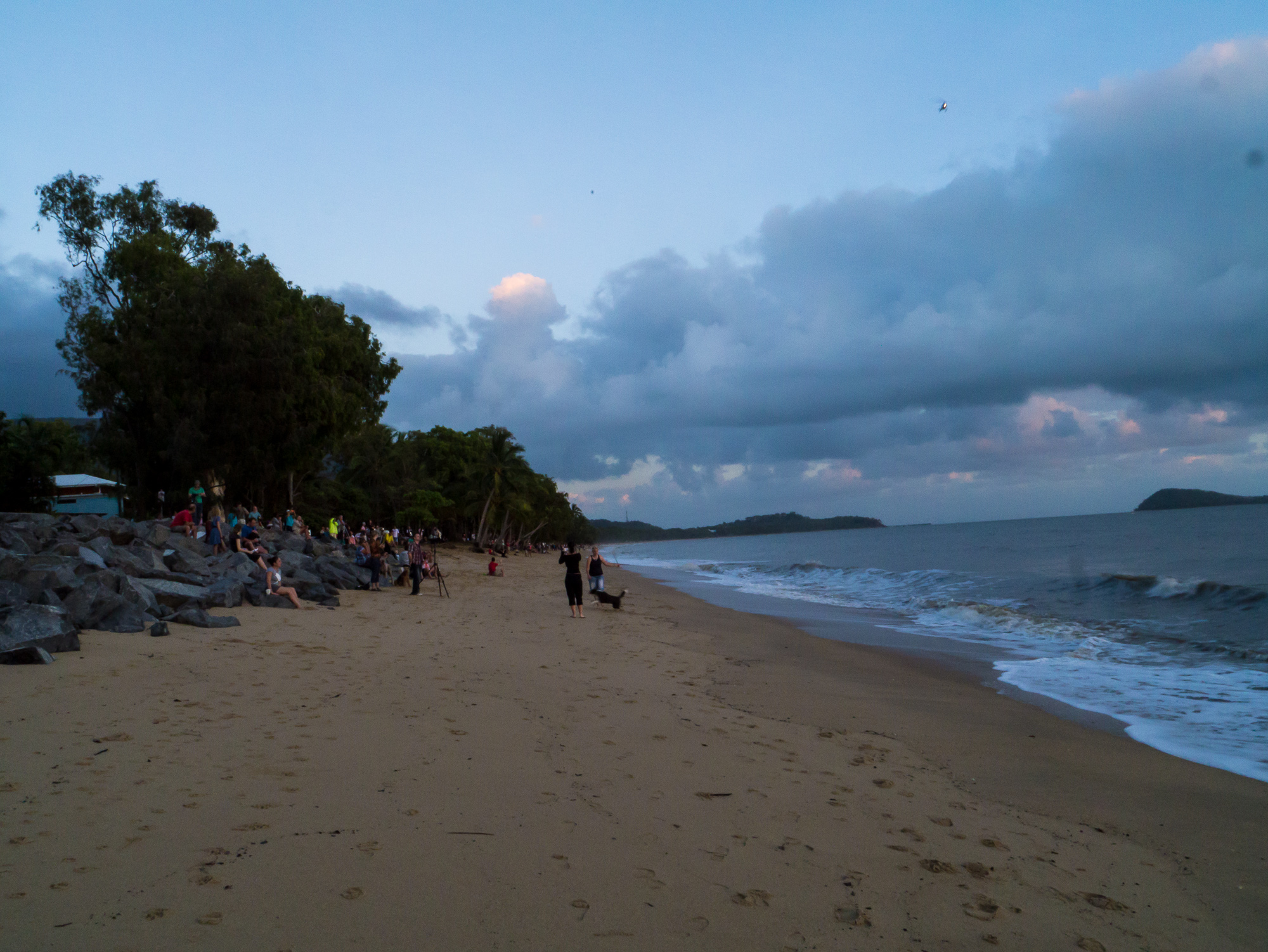
Observers of a solar eclipse, ca. 2016

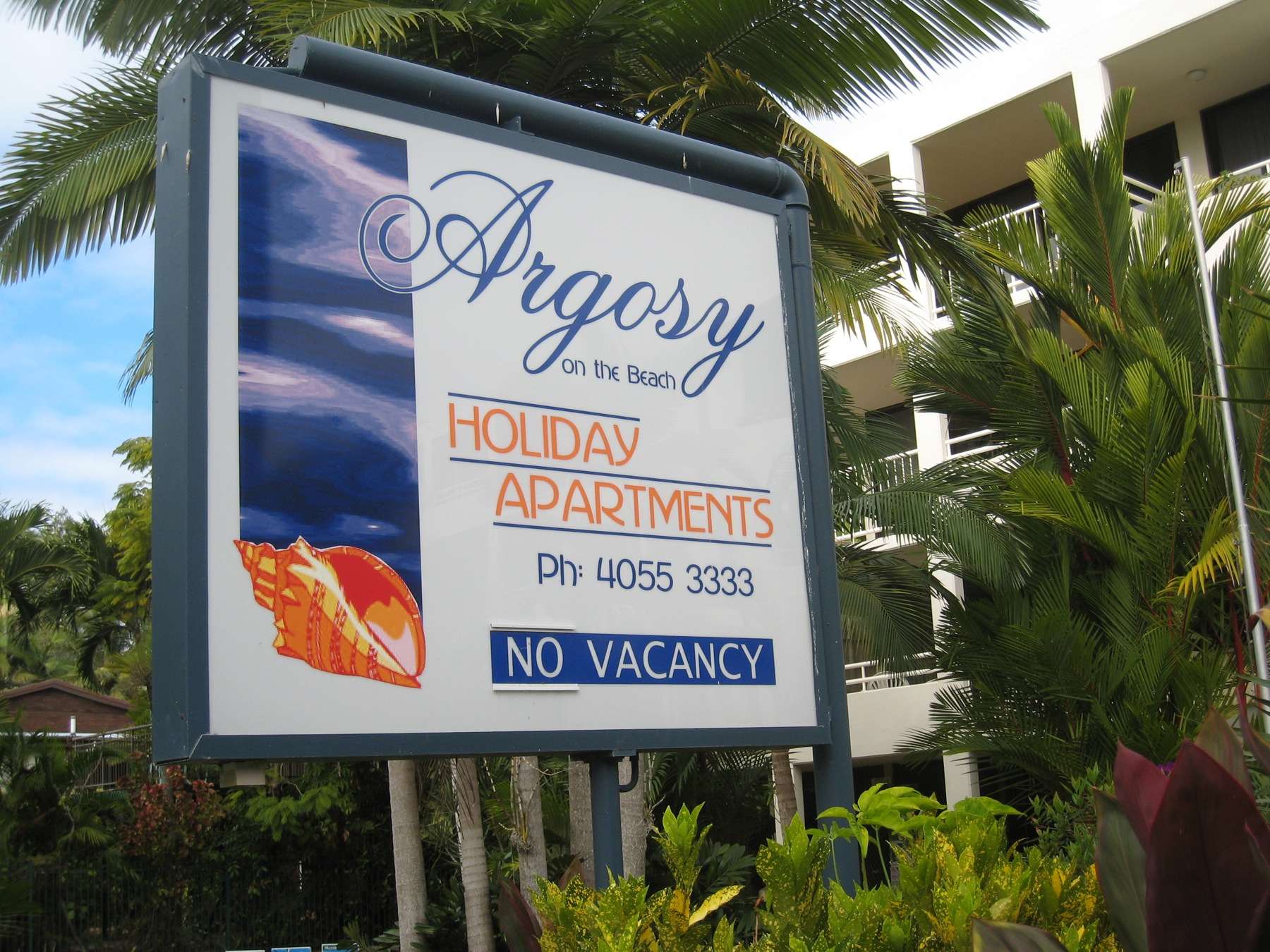
Holiday apartments on Arlington Esplanade, 2008
