= Smithfield State High School =

Location
- Cairns, Queensland; Australia; 16°48′47″S 145°41′44″E

Information
- Type: Public state, secondary
- Motto: Aspiration Belief Motivation Success
- Established: 1983
- Principal: Frank Brunetto (Whole School) Jesse Hutchinson (Junior School) Tiarne Sparks (Middle School) Mara Turner (Senior School)
- Enrolment: c. 1300
- Campus: Smithfield
- Colours: Blue and orange
- Website: smithfieldshs.eq.edu.au

Smithfield State High School is a secondary school located in Smithfield, Cairns, Queensland, Australia. Smithfield State High School operates as an independent public secondary school and is known for its unique partnership with Trinity Beach State School and James Cook University, through the Tropical North Learning Academy. The school attracts students primarily from the Cairns and tableland area.

As of 2020, there are about 1000 students (ranging from years 7 to 12) enrolled in the school.

== History ==
The school opened in 1983.

== Extra curricular ==
- The school's extra curricular music program consists of a Concert Band and a Jazz Academy.
- Smithfield State High School offers a range of sporting programs inclusive of rugby league, Australian rules football, futsal, rugby union, soccer, and netball.

== School Houses ==
There are 4 school houses that revolve around sporting and swimming events. These are known beaches near Smithfield, Cairns, Queensland. They are called Clifton (Green), Ellis (Yellow), Kewarra (Blue) and Trinity. (Red)

== See also ==
- List of schools in Far North Queensland
