= Trinity Park, Queensland =

Trinity Park
- Suburb
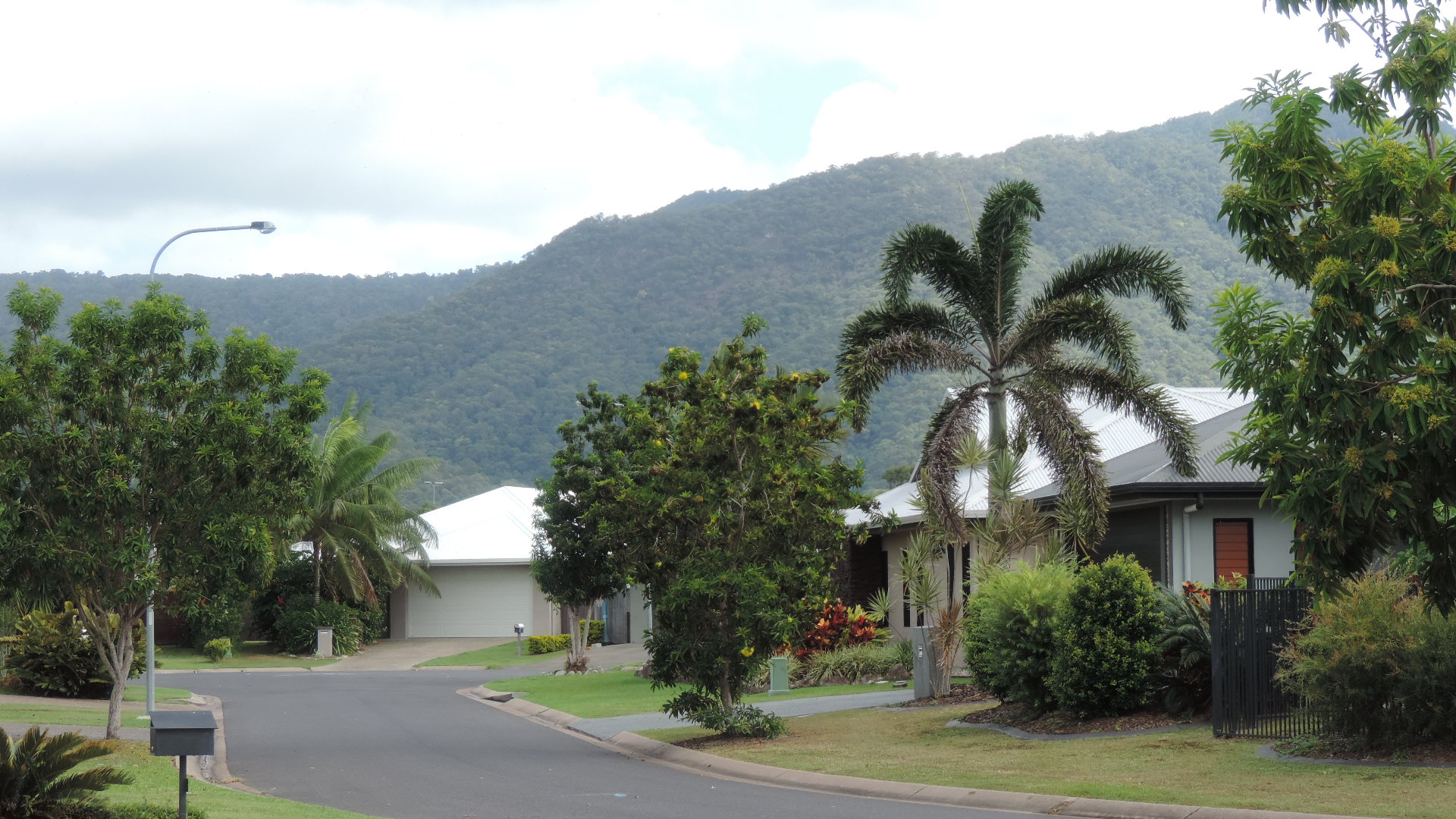
- Looking south down along Galena Close, Trinity Park, 2018

- Interactive map of Trinity Park
- Coordinates: 16.805°S 145.7041°E
- Country: Australia
- State: Queensland
- City: Cairns
- LGA: Cairns Region
- Location: 4.0 km (2.5 mi) NNE of Smithfield; 17.6 km (10.9 mi) NNW of Cairns CBD; 363 km (226 mi) N of Townsville; 1,719 km (1,068 mi) NNW of Brisbane

Government
  - State electorate: Barron River
  - Federal division: Leichhardt

Area
  - Total: 3.5 km^{2} (1.4 sq mi)

Population
  - Total: 3,536 (2021 census)
  - Density: 1,010/km^{2} (2,620/sq mi)
- Time zone: UTC+10:00 (AEST)
- Postcode: 4879
Suburbs around Trinity Park
Trinity Beach	Trinity Beach	Coral Sea
Smithfield	Trinity Park	Yorkeys Knob
Smithfield	Yorkeys Knob	Yorkeys Knob

Trinity Park is a coastal northern suburb of Cairns in the Cairns Region, Queensland, Australia. In the 2021 census, Trinity Park had a population of 3,536 people.

== Geography ==
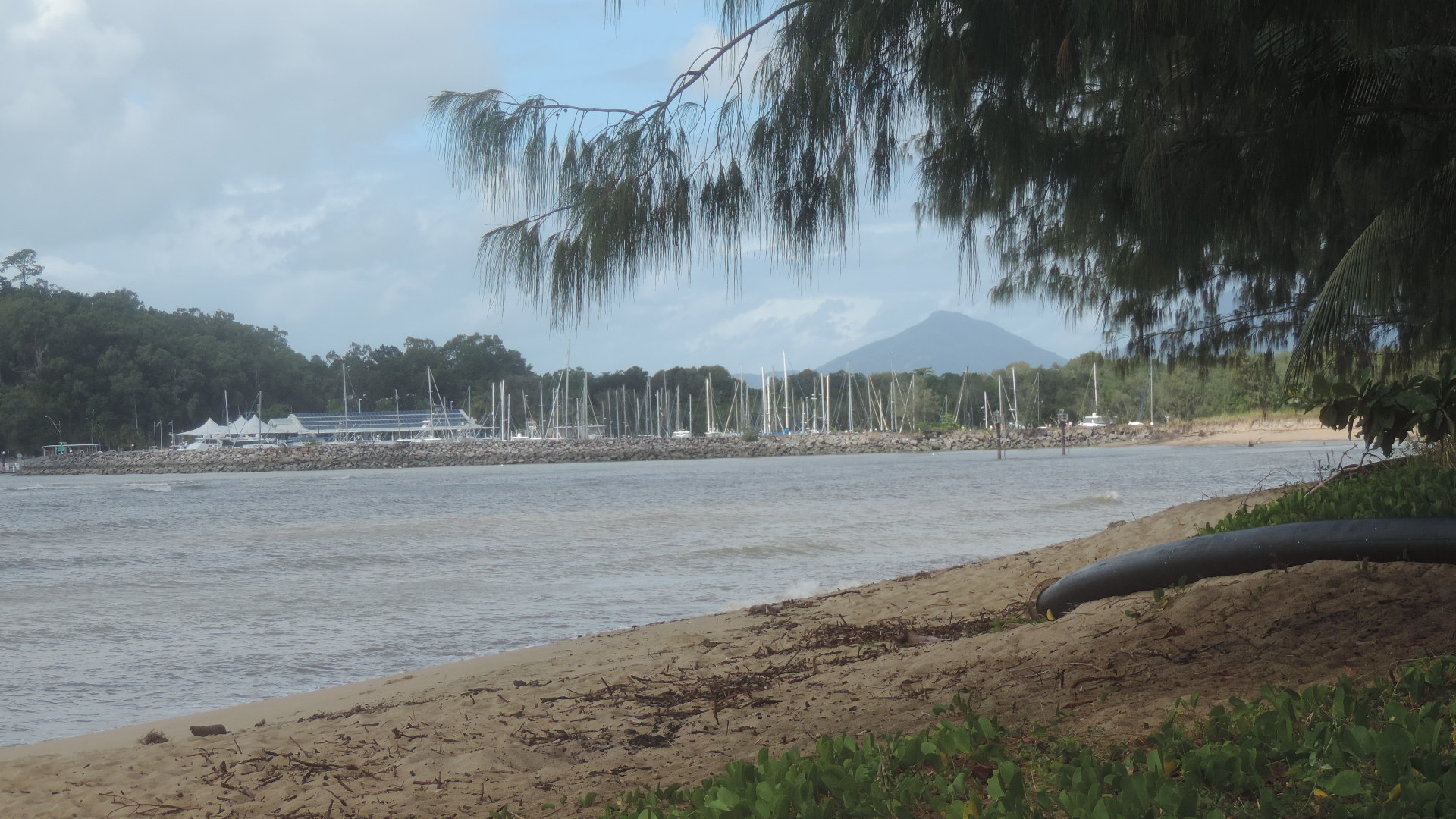
Looking south along the beach at Trinity Park with the marina at Yorkeys Knob in the distance, 2018

Trinity Park is one of Cairns' northern suburbs. It is bounded to the north-east by the Coral Sea, to the east by Half Moon Creek and to the west by the Captain Cook Highway. The land is low-lying flat land (below 10 metres above sea level). The western half of the suburb is freehold land, mostly developed as residential housing. The eastern half of the suburb remains Crown land and is not developed.

== History ==
Trinity Park is situated in the Djabugay (Tjapukai) traditional Aboriginal country.

The suburb takes its name from Trinity Bay, which was named on Trinity Sunday 1770 by Lieutenant James Cook RN of HM Bark Endeavour.

Holy Cross School opened on 28 January 1987.

== Demographics ==
In the 2016 census, Trinity Park had a population of 3,105 people.

In the 2021 census, Trinity Park had a population of 3,536 people.

== Education ==
Holy Cross School is a Catholic primary (Prep–6) school for boys and girls at 191–201 Reed Road (16.8102°S 145.6953°E). It is operated by the Roman Catholic Diocese of Cairns. In 2018, the school had an enrolment of 535 students with 35 teachers (34 full-time equivalent) and 25 non-teaching staff (17 full-time equivalent).

There are no government schools in Trinity Park. The nearest government primary school is Trinity Beach State School in neighbouring Trinity Beach to the north. The nearest government secondary school is Smithfield State High School is in neighbouring Smithfield to the west.

== Amenities ==
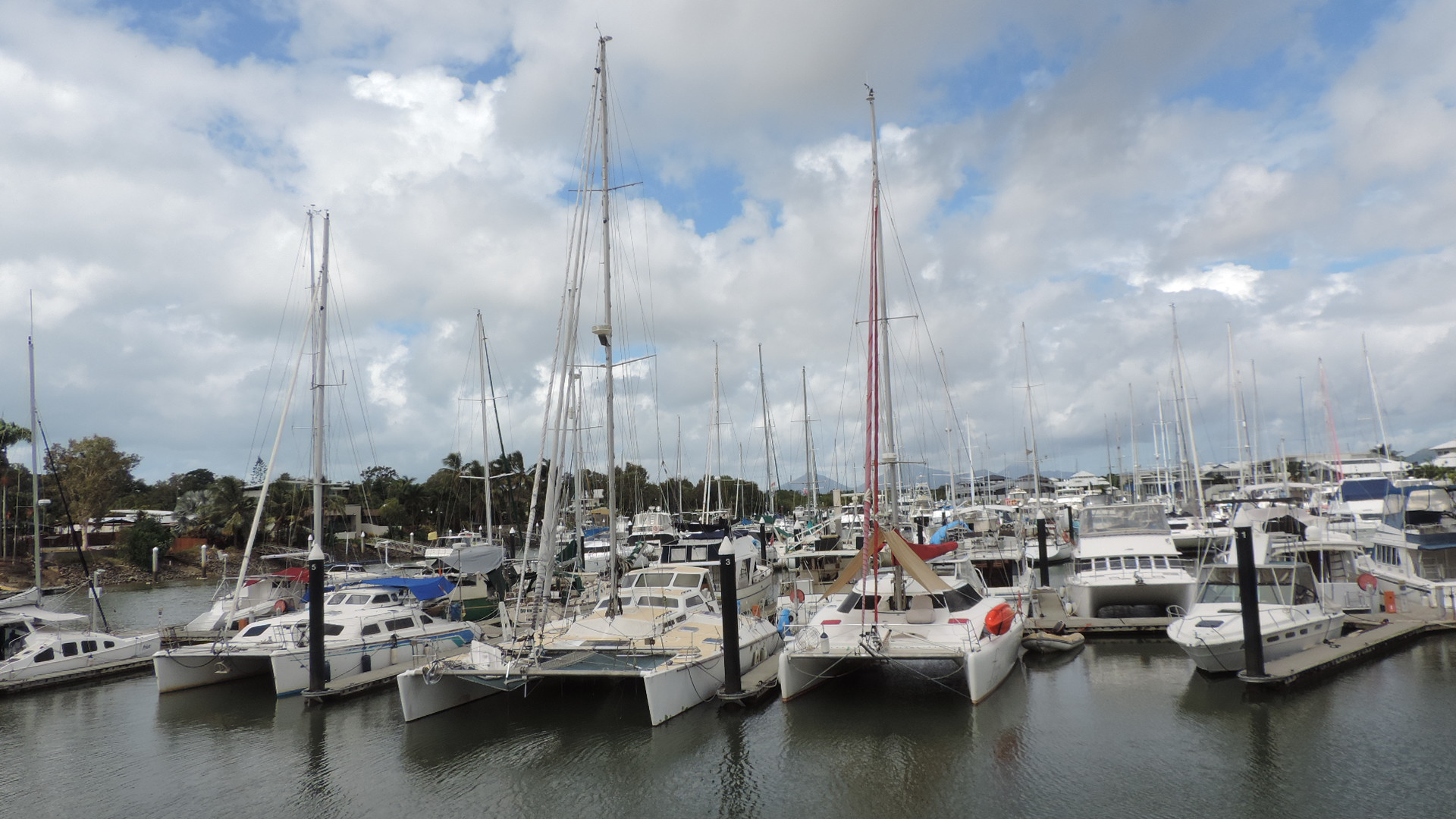
Yachts in the marina at Trinity Park, 2018

Holy Cross Catholic Church is in Reed Road (16.8102°S 145.6960°E) adjacent to the school. It is within the Northern Beaches Parish of the Roman Catholic Diocese of Cairns.

Bluewater Marina has 108 berths and connects to Half Moon Creek which leads into the Coral Sea. It is on Harbour Drive (16.8029°S 145.7079°E).

There is a public boat ramp and floating walkway at Bluewater Marina. It is accessed from Schooner Road (16.8019°S 145.7069°E). It is managed by the Cairns Regional Council.
