= Buchan, Queensland =

Buchan
- Town
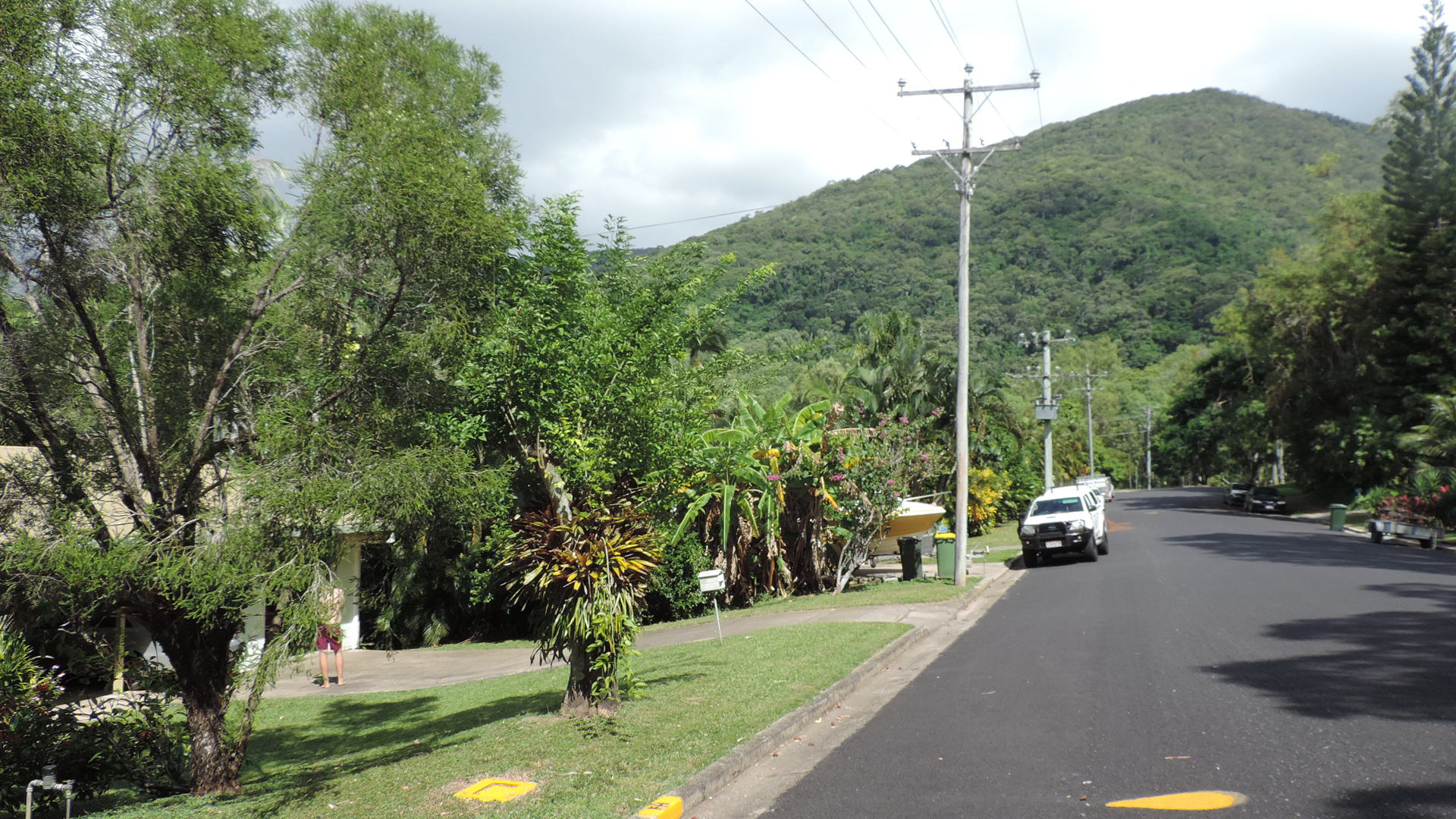
- Buchan Street, 2018

- Coordinates: 16.7433°S 145.6683°E
- Country: Australia
- State: Queensland
- LGA: Cairns Region
- Location: 27 km (17 mi) N of Cairns; 1,727 km (1,073 mi) NNW of Brisbane

Government
  - State electorate: Cook
  - Federal division: Leichhardt
- Elevation: 5 m (16 ft)
- Time zone: UTC+10:00 (AEST)
- Postcode: 4816

Buchan is a coastal town in the locality of Palm Cove in the Cairns Region, Queensland, Australia.

== Geography ==
Buchan is a coastal town with sandy beaches north and south of Buchan Point. The Captain Cook Highway passes through the town.

== History ==
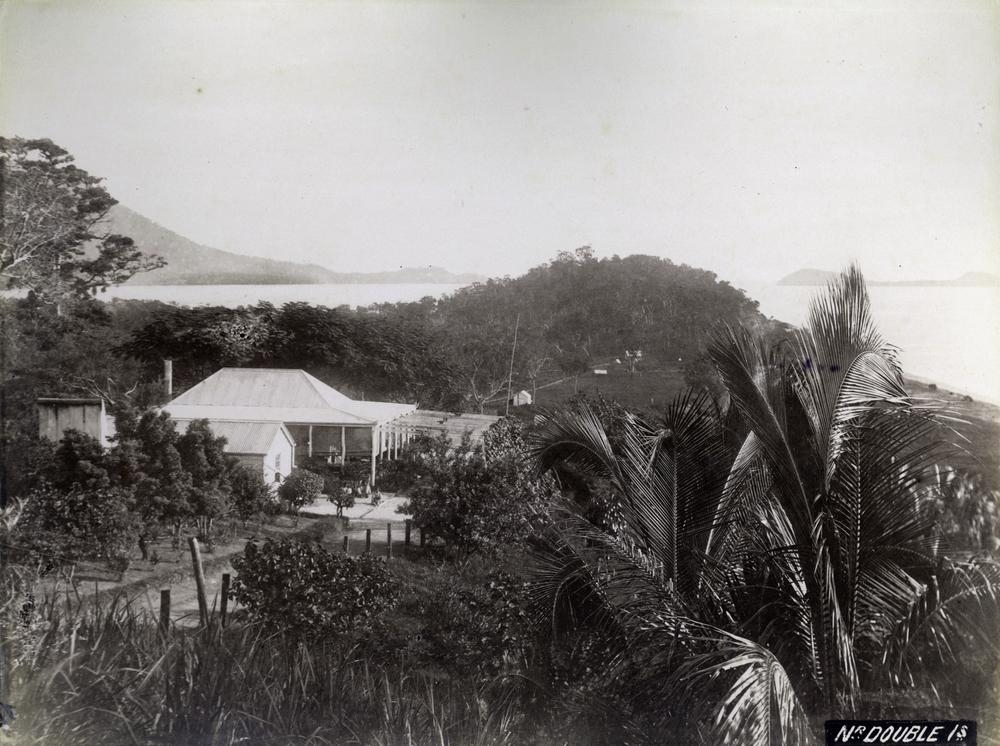
View from Buchan past Buchan Point towards Double Island, circa 1890

The town name is derived from Mount Buchan, named on 20 October 1873 by explorer George Elphinstone Dalrymple, after one of the districts of his native Aberdeenshire in Scotland.

In the 1880s, there was a coconut palm plantation with over 600 trees owned by James Jamieson known as the Mount Buchan Estate. It was predicted to become a popular seaside retreat for the people of Cairns. The palm trees along the beach areas gave it the nickname Palm Beach but, as that caused confusion with other places officially known as Palm Beach, it acquired the name Palm Cove, which is now the official name for the locality (although the town itself remains gazetted as Buchan).

In April 1933, a number of families were living at Buchan Point while the men were working on the road from Cairns to Port Douglas (now the Captain Cook Highway). The families asked the Queensland Government to provide a school. Buchan Point State School opened in 1933 and in December 1933 the students enjoyed a "breaking up" party at Hartley's Creek. The school closed in February 1934.
