= Kewarra Beach =

Kewarra Beach Cairns, Queensland
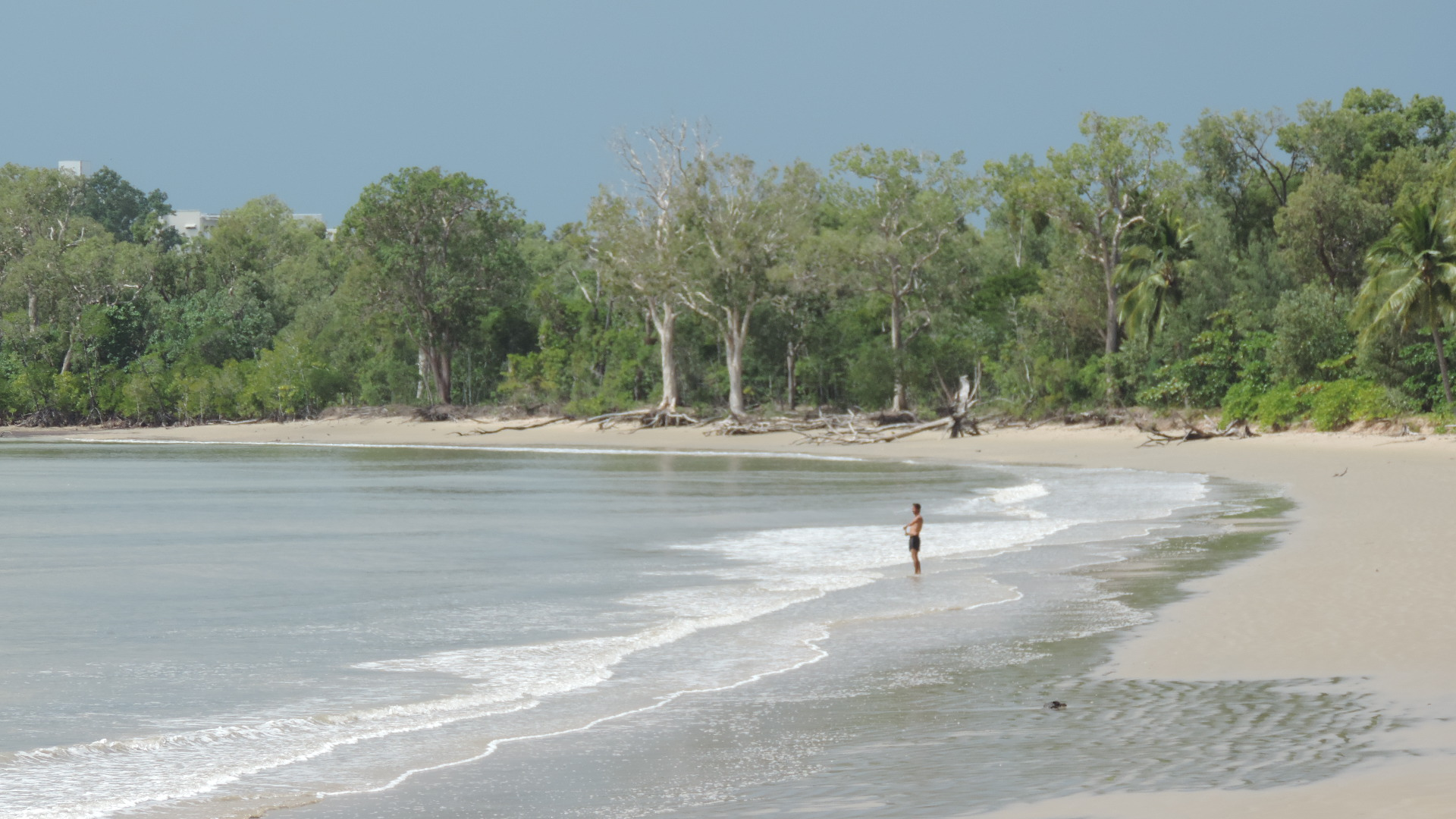
- Beach looking south towards Taylor Point, 2018

- Coordinates: 16.7875°S 145.6763°E
- Population: 6,133 (2021 census)
  - Density: 958/km^{2} (2,482/sq mi)
- Postcode(s): 4879
- Area: 6.4 km^{2} (2.5 sq mi)
- Time zone: AEST (UTC+10:00)
- Location: 19.3 km (12 mi) NNW of Cairns CBD; 364 km (226 mi) NNW of Townsville; 1,709 km (1,062 mi) NNW of Brisbane
- LGA(s): Cairns Region
- State electorate(s): Barron River
- Federal division(s): Leichhardt
Suburbs around Kewarra Beach:
Clifton Beach	Clifton Beach	Coral Sea
Macalister Range	Kewarra Beach	Trinity Beach
Macalister Range	Smithfield	Trinity Beach

Kewarra Beach is a coastal suburb of Cairns in the Cairns Region, Queensland, Australia. In the 2021 census, Kewarra Beach had a population of 6,133 people.

== Geography ==
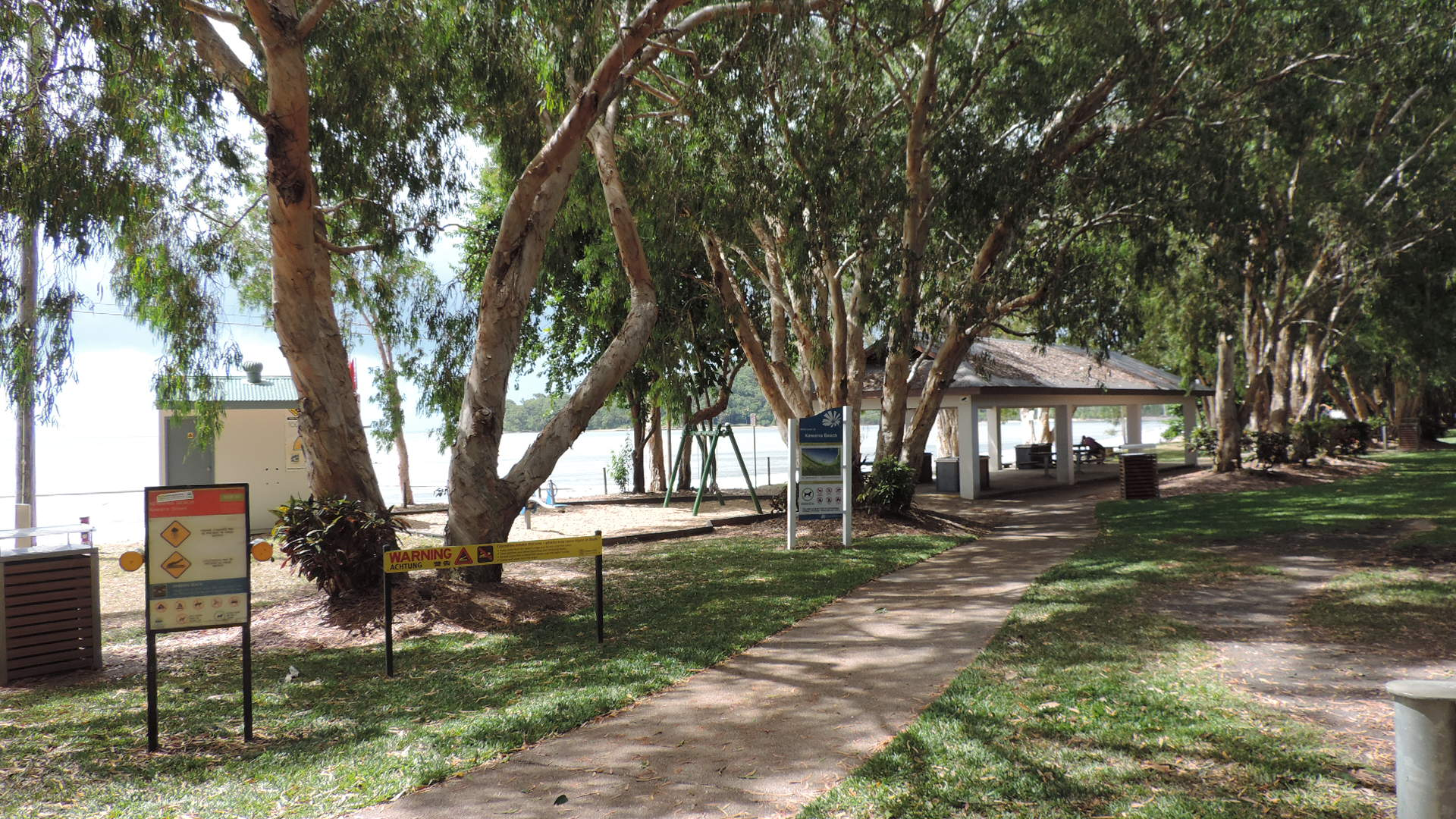
Foreshore parkland, 2018

Kewarra Beach is bordered by the Coral Sea to the east and Kuranda National Park to the west. The Captain Cook Highway passes through the suburb from the south-west to the north.

== History ==
Kewarra Beach is situated in the Djabugay (Tjapukai) traditional Aboriginal country. The origin of the suburb name is said to be from an Aboriginal word 'kewarra', meaning 'at the foot of the rainbow', though this has not been confirmed by linguists.

The area was primarily used for growing sugar cane until the suburb was developed in the 1970s and 90s. The western side of the highway was developed with a golf course (Paradise Palms) with housing to the north and south.

Trinity Anglican School opened its Kewarra Beach campus in 2002.

== Demographics ==
In the 2016 census, Kewarra Beach had a population of 5,652 people.

In the 2021 census, Kewarra Beach had a population of 6,133 people.

== Education ==
Trinity Anglican School is a private primary (Prep-6) campus at 45 Poolwood Road (16.7888°S 145.6829°E) of the Trinity Anglican School at White Rock (which opened in 1983).

There are no government schools in Kewarra Beach. The nearest government primary school is Trinity Beach State School in neighbouring Trinity Beach to the east. The nearest government secondary school is Smithfield State High School in neighbouring Smithfield to the south.

== Amenities ==
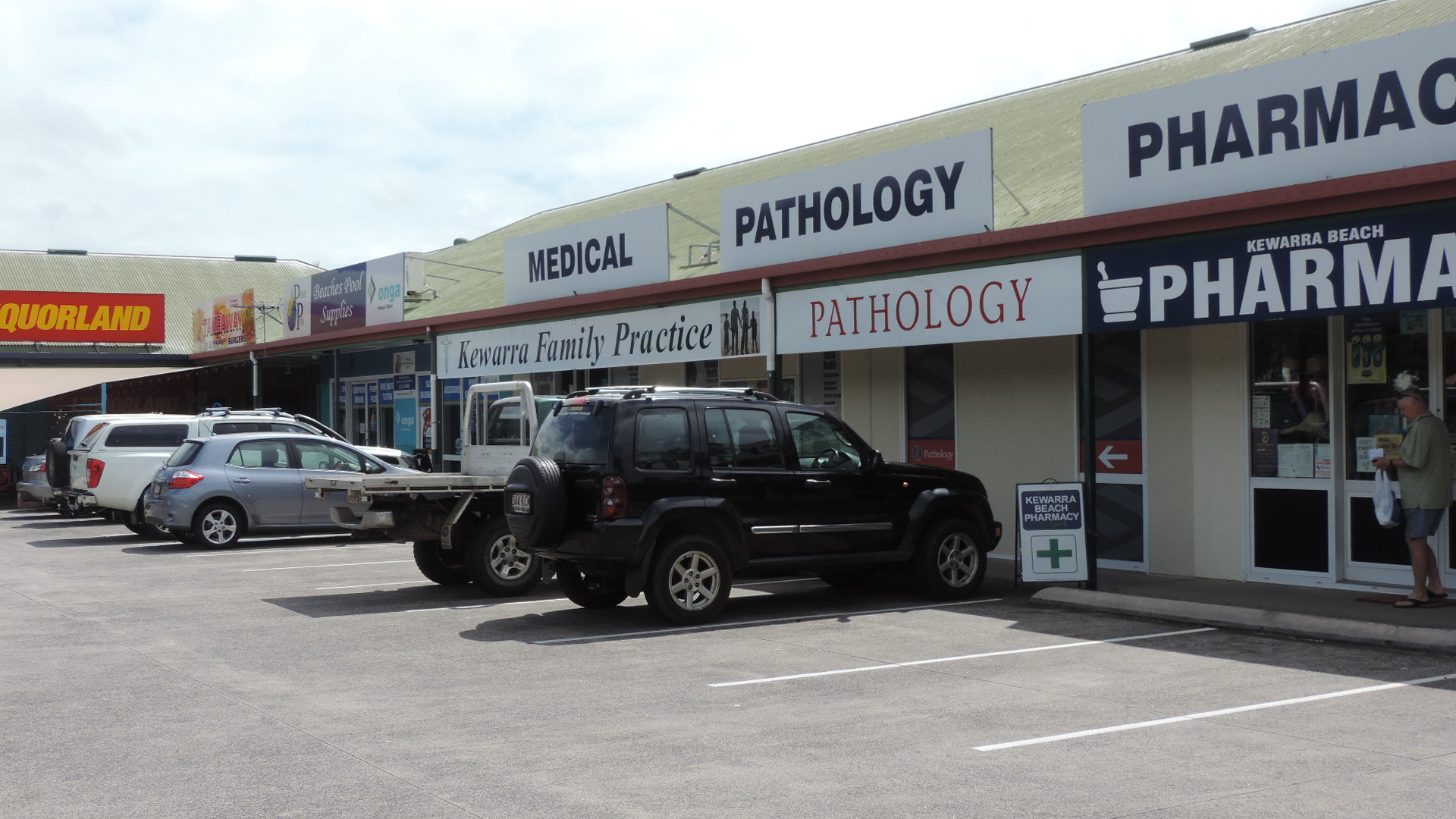
Shopping centre, 2018

Kewarra Beach Community Hall is at 41 Poolwood Road (16.78977°S 145.68215°E). It is capable of seating up to 80 people and is operated by the Cairns Regional Council.

A small shopping centre is located on Poolwood Road.

The foreshore reserve, Pelican Park, adjoins the beach. It has a swimming enclosure that excludes marine stingers at the north end. Other reserves include Brolga Park and Crocodile Park.

== Attractions ==
Tourist-oriented developments include Kewarra Beach Resort.

== Transport ==
Kewarra Beach is 20 kilometres (12 mi) north of Cairns via the Captain Cook Highway. Sunbus bus route 111 originates on Cottlesloe Drive and terminates at Cairns Central Shopping Centre via Trinity Beach and Trinity Park.
