= Trinity Beach, Queensland =

Trinity Beach
- Suburb
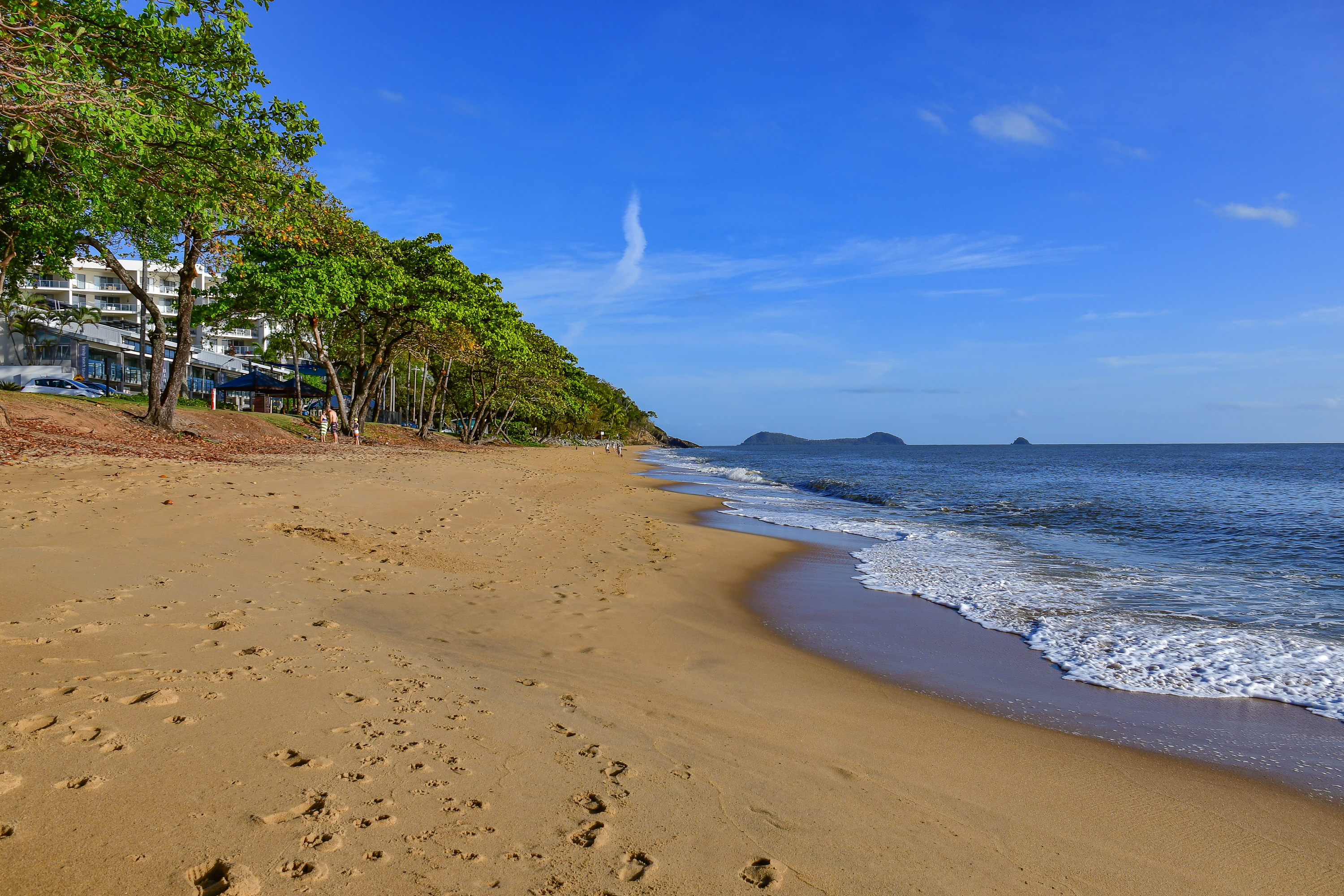
- Trinity Beach looking north

- Interactive map of Trinity Beach
- Coordinates: 16.7933°S 145.6966°E
- Country: Australia
- State: Queensland
- City: Cairns
- LGA: Cairns Region
- Location: 19.6 km (12.2 mi) NNW of Cairns CBD; 365 km (227 mi) NNW of Townsville; 1,726 km (1,072 mi) NNW of Brisbane

Government
  - State electorate: Barron River
  - Federal division: Leichhardt

Area
  - Total: 8.6 km^{2} (3.3 sq mi)

Population
  - Total: 6,594 (2021 census)
  - Density: 767/km^{2} (1,986/sq mi)
- Time zone: UTC+10:00 (AEST)
- Postcode: 4879
Suburbs around Trinity Beach
| Kewarra Beach | Coral Sea | Coral Sea |
| Macalister Range | Trinity Beach | Coral Sea |
| Smithfield | Smithfield | Trinity Park |

Trinity Beach is a coastal suburb of Cairns in the Cairns Region, Queensland, Australia. In the 2021 census, Trinity Beach had a population of 6,594 people.

== Geography ==
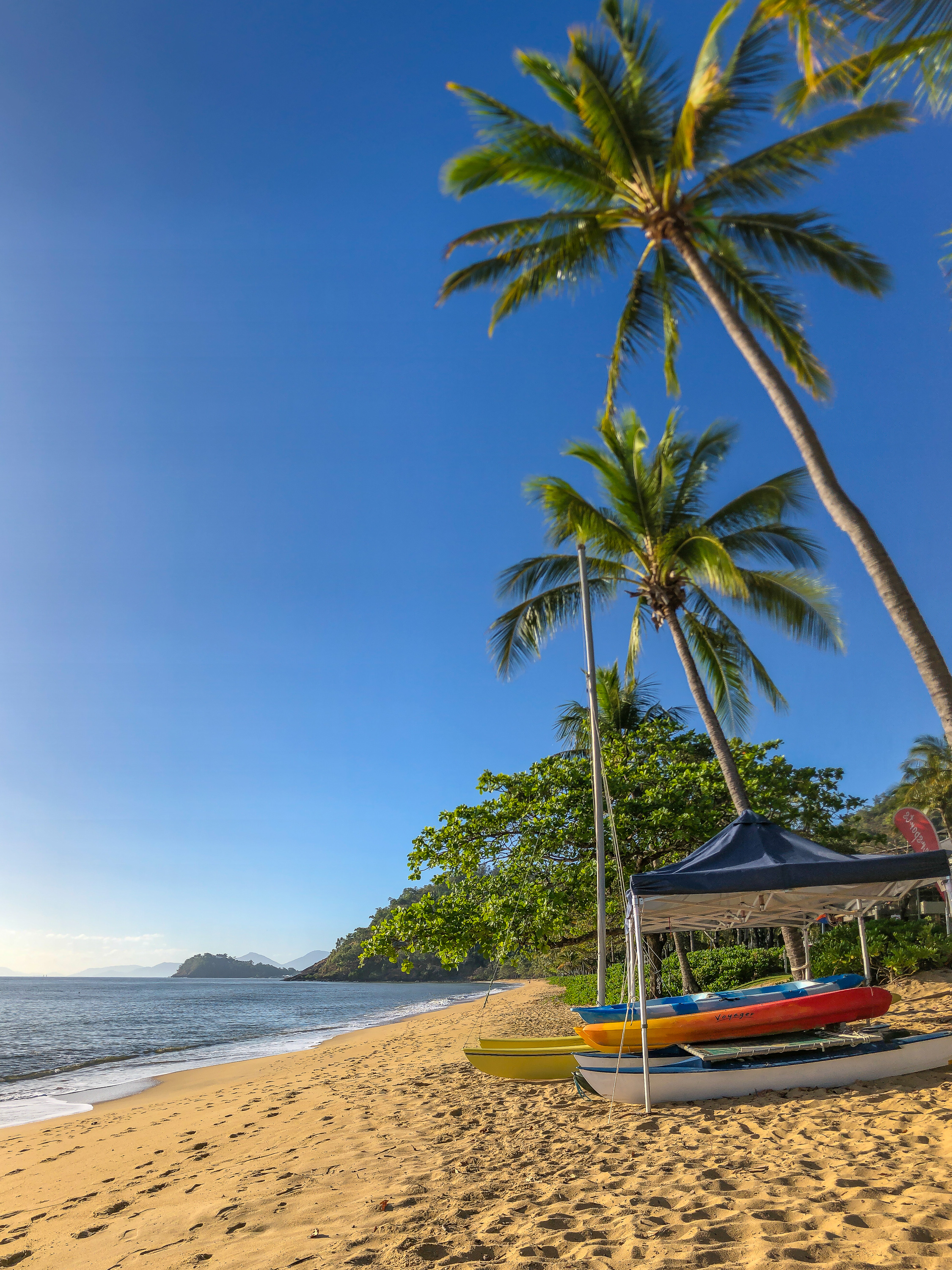
Looking south along Trinity Beach September 2018

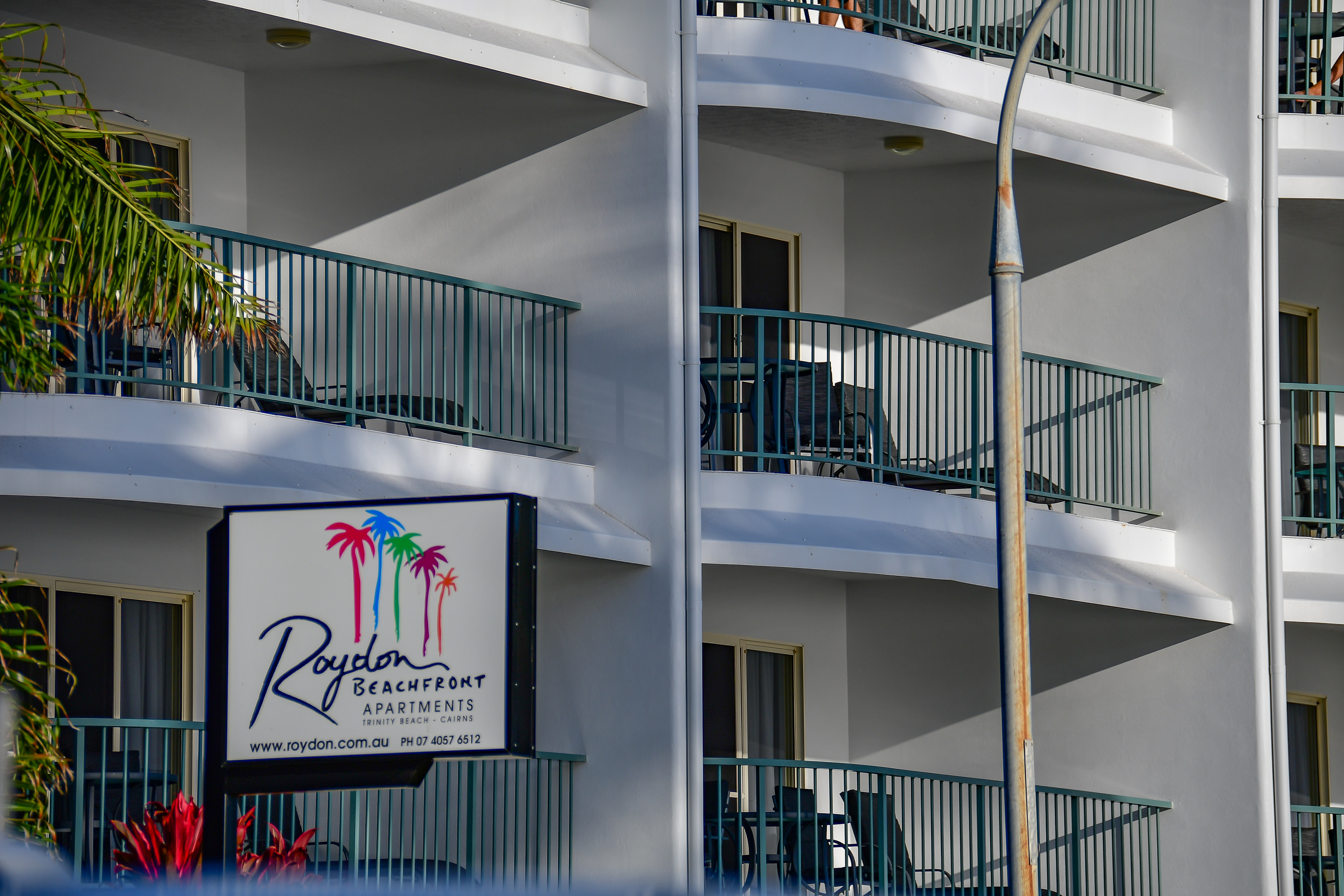
Trinity Beach beachfront resorts and apartments

Trinity Beach is approximately 20 kilometres (10 mi) from the Cairns city centre and approximately 6.6 km from Smithfield. Trinity Beach is also a beach stretching for about a mile on the eastern coast of Australia bounded by the Coral Sea. The suburb itself is approximately 2 km wide.

== History ==
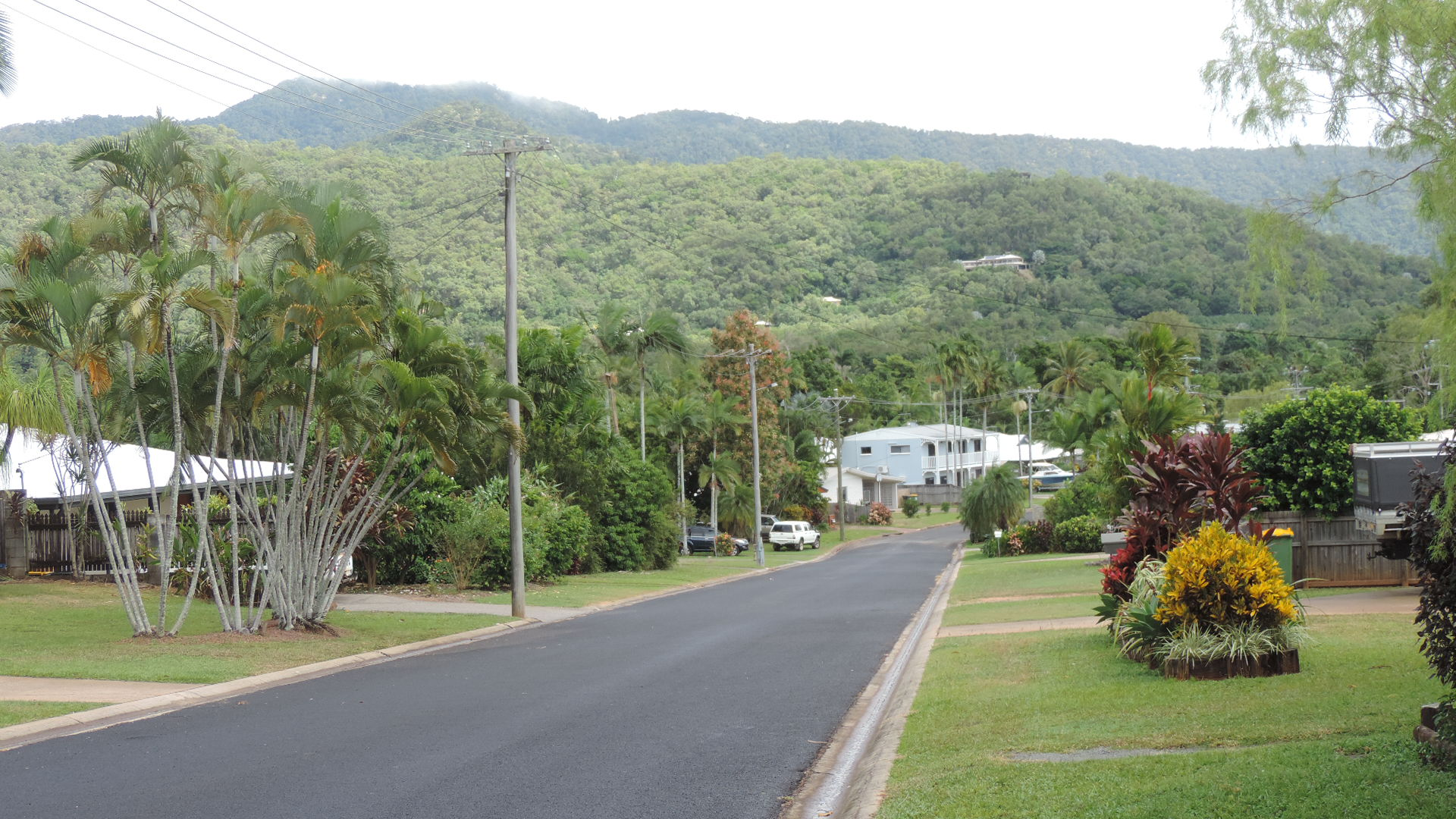
Looking west along Kokopo Close, Trinity Beach, 2018

Trinity Beach is situated in the Djabugay (Tjapukai) traditional Aboriginal country.

The origin of the suburb name is derived from Trinity Bay.

From 1943 to 1944, Trinity Beach was the site of intensive training in amphibious warfare for Australian and American troops in the context of World War II.

Trinity Beach State School opened on 30 January 1979.

As part of Mulgrave Shire, Trinity Beach experienced suburban development beginning in the 1970s, leading to a population of over 2000 by the mid-1980s.

Trinity Beach became part of the new City of Cairns with the amalgamation of Mulgrave Shire into the new city on 22 March 1995.

In 2000, Cyclone Steve, which made landfall in the Cairns northern beaches area near Trinity Beach, caused significant damage to the roof of the Trinity Beach Hotel.

From 2004 to 2008, the 173-ha Bluewater subdivision, which extends through both Trinity Beach and Trinity Park, was approved for development. As with several other areas in Trinity Beach, portions of the estate sit in a flood zone due to potential inflows from Moore's Gully, which led to a substantial flooding mitigation project for the development in 2010.

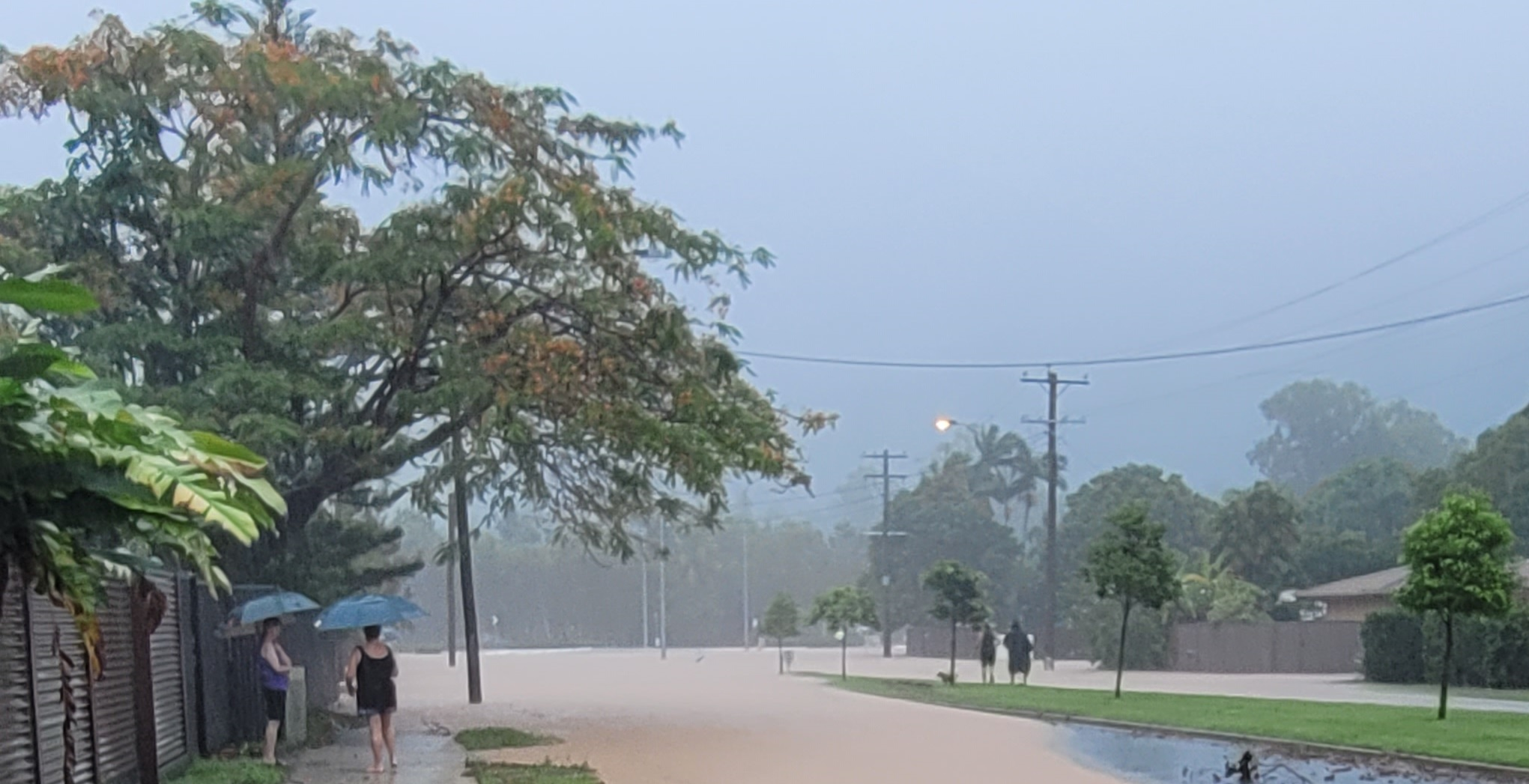
Receding floodwaters on Trinity Beach Road, 17 December 2023

In 2023, Trinity Beach was affected by Cyclone Jasper and the resulting 2023 Cairns floods. On 13 December, as the cyclone made landfall, the Trinity Beach waterfront experienced a storm surge event, while soon after overnight, multiple waterfront businesses were vandalised and looted.

On the morning of 17 December, like other Cairns northern beaches suburbs, Trinity Beach experienced flooding. This flooding led to an evacuation warning for the Bluewater Estate and major road closures, which resulted in isolation from the rest of Cairns. Videos on social media soon emerged showing inundated residential neighbourhoods in the suburb. The beach itself was thickly covered with debris in the aftermath of the flooding.

Ahead of the 2024 Queensland state election, preservation of Taylor Point, a scenic, undeveloped part of the Trinity Beach waterfront, became a point of contention as local election candidates pushed for public acquisition. The property was privately acquired in early October 2024, after which Queensland Labor Party threatened compulsory acquisition of the property.

== Demographics ==
In the 2011 census, Trinity Beach had a population of 4,734 people.

In the 2016 census, Trinity Beach had a population of 5,488 people.

In the 2021 census, Trinity Beach had a population of 6,594 people.

== Education ==
Trinity Beach State School is a government primary (Prep–6) school for boys and girls at 25–45 Madang Street (corner of Wewak Street, 16.7948°S 145.6895°E). It includes a special education program. In 2016, the school had an enrolment of 923 students with 60 teaching staff (57 full-time equivalent) and 36 non-teaching staff (22 full-time equivalent). In 2018, the school had an enrolment of 1,027 students with 68 teachers (64 full-time equivalent) and 49 non-teaching staff (32 full-time equivalent).

There are no secondary schools in Trinity Beach. The nearest government secondary school is Smithfield State High School in neighbouring Smithfield to the south.

== Amenities ==
Trinity Beach Community Hall is at 51 Trinity Beach Road (16.78940°S 145.69424°E). In 2024, a new community hall was constructed by the Cairns Regional Council.
