= Central Hotel, Cairns =

Central Hotel
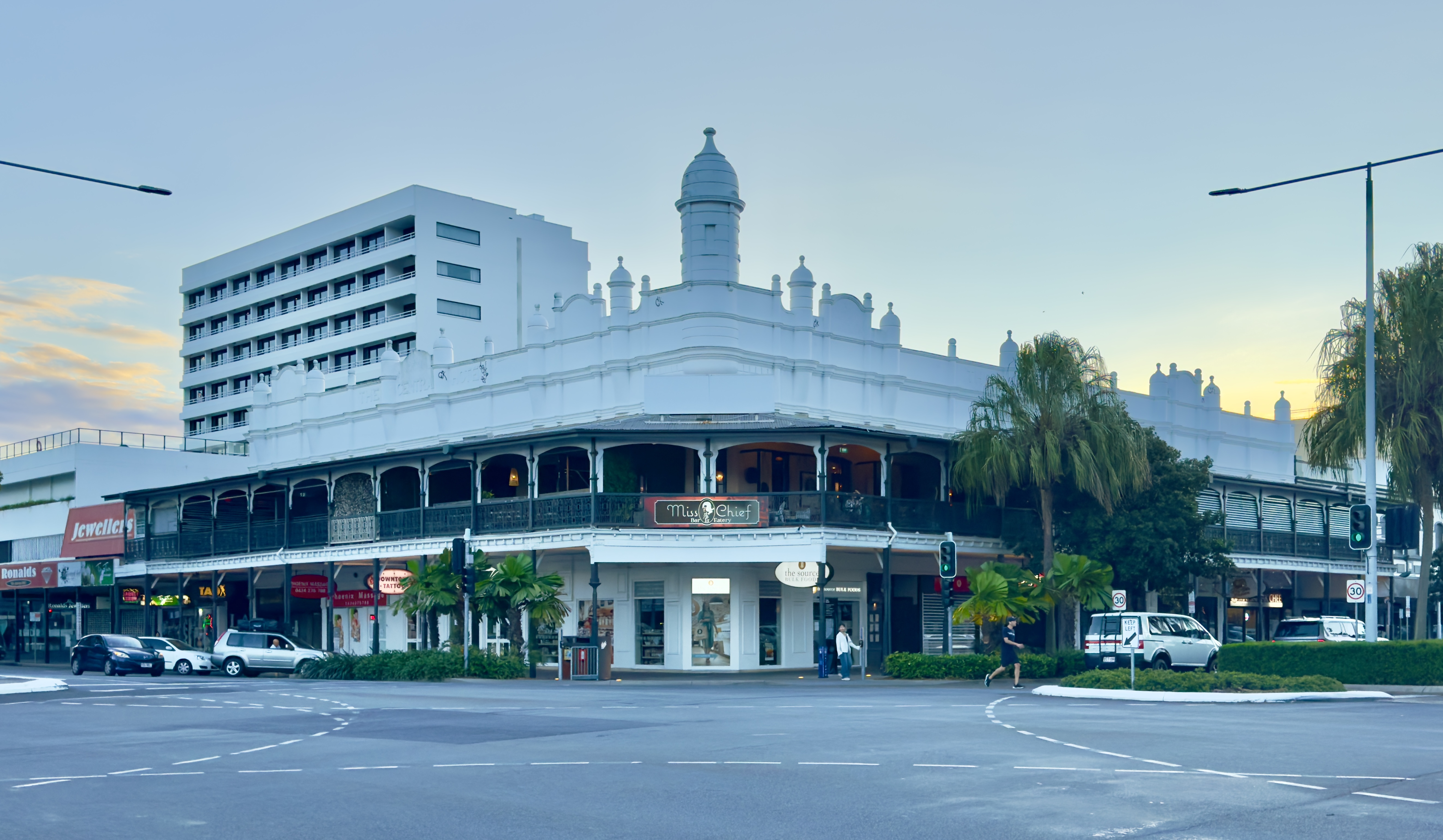
- Central Hotel, 2025

- Location within Queensland Location within Australia
- 16.9237°S 145.7767°E
- Location: 39–49 Lake Street, Cairns City, Cairns, Cairns Region, Queensland, Australia

History
- Design period: 1900–1914 (early 20th century)
- Built: 1908–1909

Site notes
- Architect: Tunbridge, Tunbridge & Lynch
- Architectural style: Art Nouveau

Queensland Heritage Register
- Official name: Central Court, Central Building, Central Hotel
- Type: state heritage (built)
- Designated: 21 October 1992
- Reference no.: 600379
- Significant period: 1900s (fabric); 1909–1988 (historical use)
- Significant components: tower, shop/s
- Builders: W Phillips

Central Hotel is a heritage-listed former hotel and now shopping centre at 39–49 Lake Street, Cairns City, Cairns, Cairns Region, Queensland, Australia. It was designed by Tunbridge, Tunbridge & Lynch and built from 1908 to 1909 by W Phillips. It is also known as Central Building and Central Court. It was added to the Queensland Heritage Register on 21 October 1992.

== History ==
This two-storeyed masonry building was erected in 1908–09 for Cairns businessman William John Munro, who acquired the land in 1900. This site previously housed a small branch of the Bank of North Queensland and various other small shops fronting Lake Street.

WJ Munro was born c. 1864 in New Zealand, to Scottish parents. As a youth he spent some time in Victoria before travelling north to Herberton, and then Cairns, in the early 1880s. A self-made man, Munro acquired, along with partners R & J Gordon, large pastoral holdings in North Queensland, and established Munro & Gordon and WJ Munro & Co., wholesale and retail butchers of Cairns, with large meatworks and meat exporting operations. His other North Queensland business interests included sugar, mining, dairying and real estate. He was a prominent and well-liked citizen, and chairman of the Cairns Shire Council from 1898 until his early death in Sydney in March 1912, at the age of 48. When news was received in Cairns of his death, flags on the public buildings and shipping were flown at half mast.

Munro commissioned the North Queensland and Melbourne architectural firm of Tunbridge, Tunbridge & Lynch to design the Central building, which was to contain a hotel and a number of shops and offices. Charles Dalton Lynch, based in Townsville, was the North Queensland partner, and the firm had a branch office in Cairns. Their work in Cairns at this time included the Harbour Board Offices and the Cairns School of Arts, both erected in 1907, and the rebuilding of the Court House Hotel, erected in 1908 a little ahead of the Central.

At the time of construction, the Central Hotel was considered palatial and one of the most imposing buildings in Cairns. It had fine views of Trinity Inlet and the surrounding hills, and itself was prominently visible to passengers alighting from the coastal steamers. Located in the new heart of the Cairns commercial district, (the name Central was considered particularly apt), the hotel was erected during the redevelopment of the Lake-Spence Street area which redefined the commercial centre of Cairns. Adjacent buildings erected at this period include the former Adelaide Steamship Co Ltd Building (1910) and Bolands Building (1913–14).

Erected by Cairns builder W Phillips, the Central Hotel comprised bar and parlours on the ground floor, with expansive verandah, dining room, kitchen & serving rooms, sitting room, 27 guest bedrooms, bathrooms, and accommodation for the lessee and staff, on the first floor. The dining room, which featured a domed roof and glass front to the verandah, could accommodate 100 diners.

The first lessee of the Central Hotel was James Watters, former licensee of the Federal Hotel in Cairns, who obtained the licence in February 1909 and commenced trade about April that year. At the Central Hotel, Watters and his wife created one of the best appointed hotels in Far North Queensland, catering in particular to travellers and visitors.

The property remained in the Munro-Martin-Mowder family until 1959, and publican James Kipps held the lease from 1924 until 1945. In 1924 he commissioned Cairns architects HR Lawrence & TMW Lordan to design alterations to the main bar.

The Central building remained substantially intact until 1975, when the ground floor interior was remodelled and some alterations were made to the first floor interior. In 1988, Fricker Developments (Qld) Pty Ltd undertook a major redevelopment of the building, converting it into a shopping court with 17 ground floor shops, and a first floor entertainment facility which included lounges, bars and a restaurant. Despite this re-working of the interior spaces, the decorative exterior was retained as a popular Cairns landmark.

== Description ==
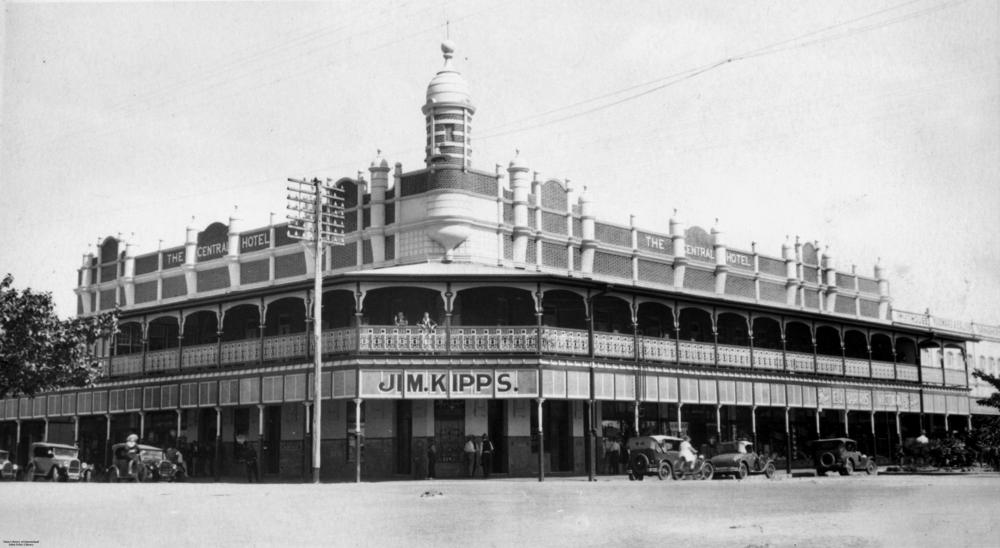
Central Hotel in Cairns, 1932

Central Court, located on the northwestern corner of Lake and Spence Streets, is a two-storeyed rendered masonry structure with verandahs to both street frontages.

The building exhibits Art Nouveau and Federation influences in its design. Decorative parapets provide a prominent skyline feature, with an asymmetrical combination of piers surmounted by cupolas projecting above, with curved gables and a cylindrical corner tower with cupola. Both street frontages have the words THE CENTRAL HOTEL placed centrally in relief.

Verandahs have timber posts, with the first floor having curved timber brackets and valance, a corrugated iron skillion awning and wrought iron balustrade. The ground floor has lattice spandrel panels, some of which are arched, and partially turned timber posts. Both verandahs have a centrally positioned void space with timber balustrade.

Internally, the building has been extensively altered and rebuilt. The ground floor has an L-shaped arcade, with entrances positioned centrally on both street frontages, with a large central eating area and central stair under a clerestory skylight.

The first floor contains a nightclub at the southern end with a restaurant to the north. Both have access to the verandah via French doors, with the southern corner having been enclosed to form office space.

== Heritage listing ==
Central Court was listed on the Queensland Heritage Register on 21 October 1992 having satisfied the following criteria.

The place is important in demonstrating the evolution or pattern of Queensland's history.

Central Court is important in demonstrating the evolution of Queensland's history, being associated with the early 20th century re-development of the area around the intersection of Lake and Spence Streets in Cairns, including construction of the Adelaide Steamship Co. Ltd Building (1910) and Boland's Building (1913–14), which re-defined the commercial centre of Cairns.

The place is important because of its aesthetic significance.

The place exhibits a range of aesthetic characteristics valued by the Cairns community, in particular: the contribution of the building, through scale, form and materials, to the Lake and Spence Streets streetscapes and Cairns townscape; the highly decorative and intact parapets and verandahs; and its landmark quality.

The place has a special association with the life or work of a particular person, group or organisation of importance in Queensland's history.

It has a special association with important Cairns businessman and local politician WJ Munro, and as evidence of the commercial work of the architectural firm Tunbridge, Tunbridge & Lynch, which executed a significant body of work in North Queensland.
