= Cairns Control Room =

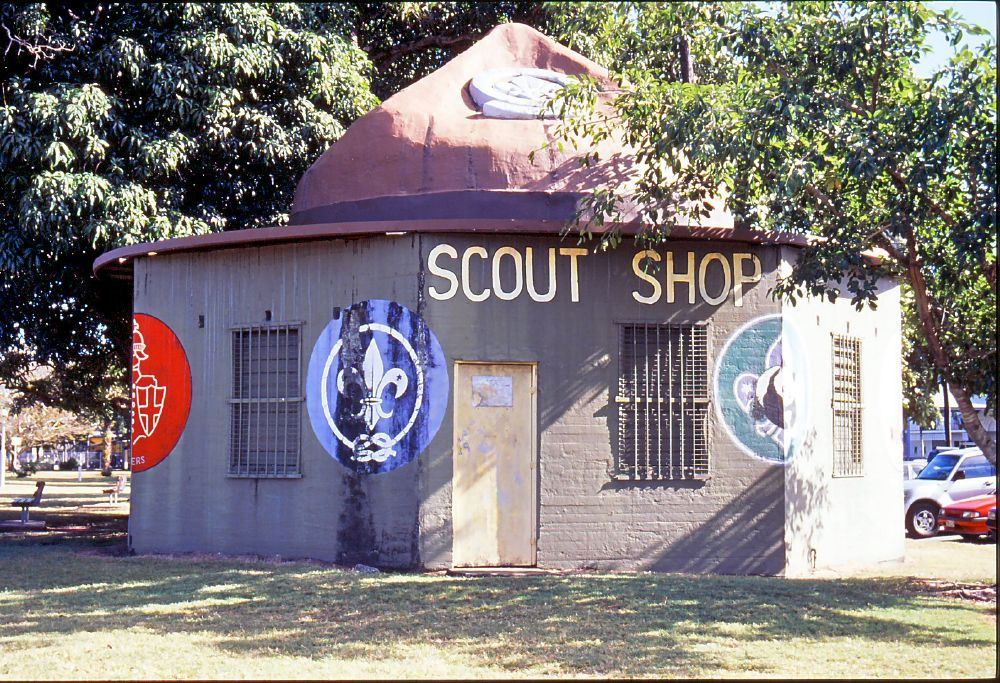
- Cairns Control Room with Scout's Hat

- Location within Queensland Location within Australia
- 16.9194°S 145.7714°E
- Location: Grafton Street, Cairns City, Cairns, Cairns Region, Queensland, Australia

History
- Design period: 1939–1945 (World War II)
- Built: 1942

Queensland Heritage Register
- Official name: World War II Volunteer Defence Corps, Cairns Control Room, Cairns Scout Hut, Cairns Scout Shop
- Type: state heritage (built)
- Designated: 16 April 2010
- Reference no.: 602744
- Significant period: 1942–
- Builders: Queensland Department of Public Works

Cairns Control Room is a heritage-listed military building at Grafton Street, Cairns City, Cairns, Cairns Region, Queensland, Australia. It was built in 1942 by the Queensland Department of Public Works. It is also known as World War II Volunteer Defence Corps, Cairns Scout Hut, and Cairns Scout Shop. It was added to the Queensland Heritage Register on 16 April 2010.

== History ==
After declaration of World War II a national Volunteer Defence Corps, founded under the banner of the Returned Soldiers League, was taken over by the Australia Army in 1941. In north Queensland VDC units were established in Townsville, Cairns and other larger towns in the region. At Cairns the local VDC used the council chambers as headquarters, but with Japan's entry in the war a more substantial building was required for a civil defence control centre in the event of air raids. In February 1942 it was decided that the Public Works Department would build a reinforced concrete control room in Norman Park for use by the VDC, police and ambulance service to coordinate emergency services in the event of air raids. Construction of the building commenced in March 1942. The building survived post-war demolitions and during the mid 1950s was handed over to the Scouting Association of Queensland for use as the organisation's local headquarters.

On 7 December 1941 Japanese aircraft made a surprise attack on the US naval base at Pearl Harbor in the Hawaiian Islands. At the same time Japanese forces launched assaults on Thailand, the Philippines and the British colony of Malaya. Three days after Pearl Harbor, two capital ships of the Royal Navy were sunk off the coast of Malaya. This gave the Japanese almost total control of the seas to Australia's north. The sudden fall of Singapore on 15 February 1942 with the rapid, unchecked Japanese advance through the islands of the Netherlands East Indies raised fears of the invasion of Australia. The devastation and high loss of life caused by Japanese air raids on Darwin and Broome early in 1942 underlined the inability of Britain to defend Australia.

A 1941 Queensland Parliamentary report by the Secretary for Health and Home Affair's the Honourable Ned Hanlon, M.L.A. identified the three potential forms of enemy attacks, air raids, bombardment from the sea or invasion. The Australian Government was the responsible authority in combating and preventing enemy attacks and the Queensland government was responsible to "maintain the activities of the community during the emergency and to provide for the safety and care of the civilian population and the protection of property". Air Raid Protection Committees were formed along the Queensland coast. These committees included the local mayor, inspector of police and the government medical officer. The police, local authorities, hospitals, fire and ambulance services were responsible for the safety of the civilian population. Other Queensland government bodies such as railways, main roads, harbours, electricity and gas providers would also be required to maintain those services during the war.

To safeguard the community, six areas were identified where measures would need to be implemented:

- the training of key personnel in air raid precautions
- air raid warnings
- the provision of shelters for those people in the streets
- safety of people in their own homes
- possible removal of non-essential population from vulnerable areas
- closure of schools and removal of school children from vulnerable areas

Air Raid Precautions were introduced in January 1942 and the Air Raid Wardens had the responsibility to ensure compliance with the regulations within the community. Black-out curtains and slit trenches became part of every home in the Cairns area. Air raid practice drills were held on a regular basis both in the daytime and evenings, and during drills people on the streets were required to move to the nearest air raid shelter. The Cairns City Council constructed seven public air raid shelter around the city for the population. The shelters were of reinforced concrete, 300 millimetres (12 in) thick and could hold fifty people seated.

Norman Park, now known as Munro Martin Park, was Cairns' first recreational reserve being gazetted in 1882. Tenders were let to clear the reserve at the end of 1887 and sporting groups lobbied the council to fence the reserve so they could hold sporting events. In 1888 the Cairns Cricket Club obtained permission to build a cricket pitch and in 1889 Council received applications for the construction of a running track and tennis courts. The reserve was named Norman Park at a Council meeting on 8 May 1890, after the then Governor of Queensland, Sir Henry Wylie Norman who had just visited Cairns. Over the years the park has played an important part in the daily life of the Cairns community. After conflict between sporting groups regarding access to the park, in 1909 the park committee recommended that sporting bodies move their activities to other venues and that the park be laid out as a garden. In the past Norman Park has served as an important community venue for activities other than sporting events. A circus was held in the grounds in 1891, a memorial service on the death of King Edward VII in 1910, and school children assembled there in 1935 to celebrate the Silver Jubilee of King George V. Brass band contests were held there regularly.

During World War II Norman Park became a focal point for military activity with various military units using it. The council at a meeting on 10 July 1941 gave permission for "C" Company 15th Garrison Battalion to erect a hutted camp on the park. Over the course of the war over fifty building were constructed on the park. Records indicate that there was a hall on Norman Park prior to its use as a hutted camp and a US Navy store at the southern end of the reserve. The Army erected a timber radio tower on land leased from the Council at the southern end of the reserve in 1944. Elements of the 17th Battalion Volunteer Defence Corps (VDC) were one of the units to occupy the park. The VDC was a "Dads Army" raised under the banner of the Returned Services League and taken over by the military in 1941. VDC members consisted of men between the ages of 17 and 65 who for various reasons were not suitable for regular military service. Their service consisted of assisting in the defence by guarding important military and civilian places, evacuating civilians if required and in an emergency assisting with the demolition of strategic facilities. The Cairns VDC battalion consisted of about 600 men. Another volunteer unit was the Women's Emergency Corps (WEC) which was raised for the emergency transport of the civilian population if required. Recruited under the umbrella of the 51st Infantry Battalion, local women that wanted to contribute to the war effort could assist in a number of areas from motor transport, horse transport, first aid, cooking or signals.

In early 1942 the local civil defence organisation was housed in the Cairns Council Chambers and the Controller, Percy Alexander Anthony, stated in a letter to the council that the chambers building provided insufficient protection in the event of an air raid and requested that a control room be built in park land. He also suggested that a band rotunda could be built on top of it and the control room could later be used for storage. The estimated cost was £750 plus another £100 for furnishings. The public service commissioner in a minute dated 23 February 1942 announced that a decision had been made for the erection of a control room as a matter of urgency. It would be constructed in Norman Park by the Queensland Department of Public Works. In addition to its civil defence role, it would also be used by police, fire brigade and ambulance services and functioned as an air raid post, first aid post, and an emergency and essential services post. In discussions with the mayor it was agreed that the fitting and furnishing of the control room would be borne by the Cairns Town Council. A work order for the construction of the control room was issued to the district Supervisor of Works on 3 March 1942 for an immediate start. The building was designed as a reinforced concrete structure, octagonal in plan with two entrances, each protected by internal concrete blast walls. There were no windows. On completion the building was fitted out with telephones and was used to coordinate air raid warden duties for the Cairns area.

Around 1950 Florence Street was realigned so that it ran in its original position through Norman Park in a straight line from the Esplanade to Mulgrave Road, thereby separating the park with a roadway. After the US Navy store (which had housed the Cairns and Regional Electricity Board since 1946) was removed in 1964 the southern section of Norman Park on the opposite side of Florence Street was used as a children's playground until 1974 when the Civic Theatre was constructed on the site. In 1954 the Cairns City Council proposed redevelopment of the northern end of Norman Park using funds from the estate of half-sisters Janet Taylor Munro and Margaret Hart Martin who died in 1945 and 1948 respectively, and donated by their niece, Margie Hart Martin for the purpose of beautification of Norman Park. In 1956 the park with its new garden beds and pathways was renamed the Munro Martin Memorial Park.

The former civil defence communications centre and control room survived the post war demolition and removal of public air raid shelters but it was not until the mid 1950s that it was given a new role when it was handed over to the Scouting Association of Queensland for their use. The Scouting Association initially used the building as their headquarters for the district which included the Atherton Tableland, Mossman and Cairns scout troops. Later the building became an area headquarters for scouts from Cardwell northward. Some of the early renovations to the building involved the removal of an internal blast wall from the front entrance on the south side of the building and cutting windows into five of the eight walls and fitting steel louvers and security grills. Two other walls had windows partly cut out but were never completed and can only be noticed from the interior of the building.

In September 1980 the Scouting Association started a major renovation program of the Control Room, which involved tiling the floor in the front (southern) section of the building and installing a ceiling. Windows were reconstructed and the exterior of the building was sand blasted and repainted. District and area scout badges were painted on the exterior of the building. On 6 October 1980 the renovated building was the venue for an evening campfire in the park, attended by the Chief Scout of Australia Sir Zelman Cowan and Lady Cowan. By 1982 arrangements had been made with local firm, Rogers Fibreglass, to construct a giant scout hat that would fit over the roof of the building. It was lowered into place at a ceremony on 22 February 1982 with the Mayor of Cairns, Alderman Ron Davis officiating and has given the building a distinctive landmark quality. The building became the Scouting Association's Area Headquarters and Scout Shop. The Scouting Association of Australia, Queensland Branch, hold a special State Lease over the building. The current lease expires on 13 February 2023.

== Description ==
The former World War II communication centre and civil defence control room is located on a 122-square-metre (1,310 sq ft) State Lease (A/SP 152633) near the corner of Florence and Grafton Streets, at the south-eastern corner of Munro Martin Park. The park is a 2-hectare (4.9-acre) reserve, rectangular in shape with its boundaries defined by Sheridan, Florence, Grafton and Minnie Streets.

The octagonal concrete building is now painted in scout colours of green and yellow and has eight scout badges painted on the exterior walls representing the various scouting levels. Sitting on top of the concrete roof is a fibreglass structure in the shape of a traditional scout hat, painted brown. The "brim" of the hat, which overhangs the roof of the former control room, has 120-millimetre (4.7 in) wide metal edging.

The front entrance to the former control room faces south-east towards Florence Street and has a timber door. Each of the eight walls measure approximately 3.9 metres (13 ft) long by 3.4 metres (11 ft) high and are off-form concrete 300 millimetres (12 in) thick. The five southernmost walls have had window opening created and fitted with steel louvres. Each window opening measures approximately 1.5 by 9 metres (4 ft 11 in × 29 ft 6 in) and is fitted with 80-by-50-millimetre (3.1 in × 2.0 in) steel mesh covered with a steel grill that is bolted to the walls. There are sets of three air vents on six of the eight walls each vent 120 by 80 millimetres (4.7 in × 3.1 in). The front and rear walls do not have air vents and the rear door entrance is boarded closed.

The interior contains one main room and two smaller rooms to the rear with a central corridor leading around the rear interior blast wall to the rear entrance. The interior walls are 150-millimetre (5.9 in) thick concrete. The rear section is exposed concrete and in an unpainted state. The main room has painted walls and a tiled floor and has had a ceiling lined with gyprock over the front section of the main room. There is a 300-millimetre (12 in) square concrete post 2.5 metres (8 ft 2 in) inside the front entrance and there is evidence of the removal of a wall between the post and the eastern wall.

== Heritage listing ==
The Cairns Control Room of the World War II Volunteer Defence Corps was listed on the Queensland Heritage Register on 16 April 2010 having satisfied the following criteria.

The place is important in demonstrating the evolution or pattern of Queensland's history.

The Control Room is important in demonstrating the urgent measures taken for air raid protection and the conditions in which the air raid wardens worked, and is reminder of how close World War II came to Queensland and in particular the State's northern region.

The place is significant evidence of the important role played by volunteers in the pattern of Queensland's history, particularly the Volunteer Defence Corps operating during WWII.

The place demonstrates rare, uncommon or endangered aspects of Queensland's cultural heritage.

The WWII Volunteer Defence Corps Control Room in Cairns demonstrates an unusual design for a civil defence control room, being purpose built to protect air raid wardens during World War II and to later serve as the base for a band rotunda.

The place is important in demonstrating the principal characteristics of a particular class of cultural places.

The WWII Volunteer Defence Corps Control Room in Cairns is important in demonstrating some of the principal characteristics of a World War II civil defence control room, including 300-millimetre (12 in) external reinforced concrete walls and roof and an internal concrete wall that offered protection from the effects of bomb blast.
