= Ports North =

Queensland Government company managing sea ports in Far North Queensland

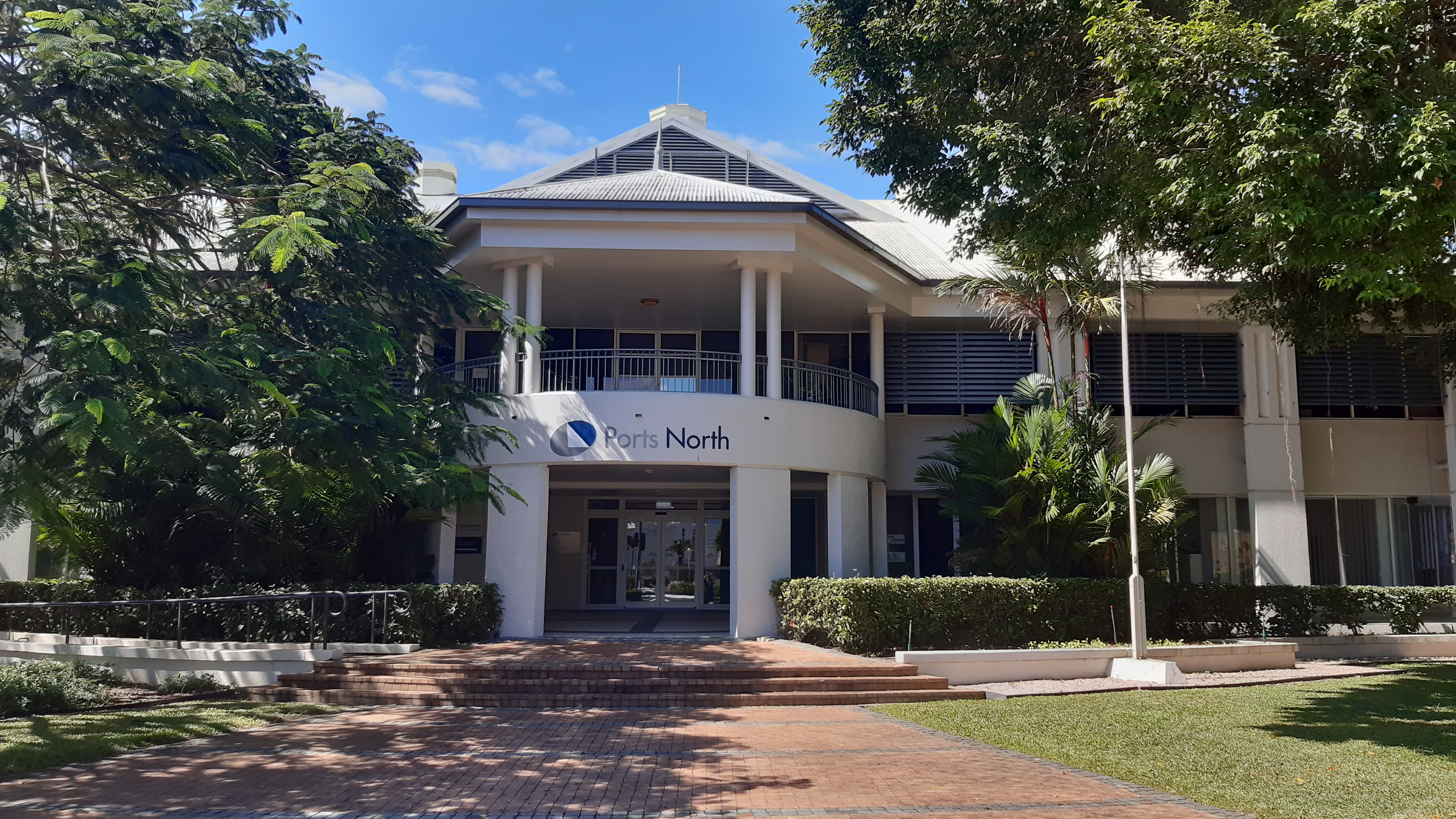
- Ports North headquarters in Cairns

Statutory corporation overview
- Preceding Statutory corporation: Cairns Port Authority
- Jurisdiction: The State of Queensland
- Headquarters: Cairns, Queensland; 16°55′36″S 145°46′42″E
- Parent Statutory corporation: Far North Queensland Ports Corporation Limited
- Website: www.portsnorth.com.au

Ports North, the trading name of the Far North Queensland Ports Corporation Limited, is a Queensland Government statutory corporation that is responsible for the Cairns Marlin Marina and the Cairns Cityport project and the ports in Cairns, Cape Flattery, Karumba, Mourilyan, Skardon River, Quintell Beach, Thursday Island, Burketown and Cooktown, in Queensland, Australia. Since 2023, the shareholding Ministers are the Deputy Premier, Treasurer and Minister for Transport and Main Roads.

== History ==
Formerly known as the Cairns Port Authority, the corporation was responsible for the operation of the Cairns International Airport until the sale of the airport in December 2008 to a private consortium. The former authority was responsible for the Cairns Seaport and in 2009 became responsible for the regional ports of Mourilyan, Cooktown, Cape Flattery, Quintell Beach, Thursday Island, Skardon River, Karumba and Burketown.

== Cairns Seaport ==
The Cairns Seaport is located on Trinity Inlet. It handles cargo and passenger vessels. The port is an important contributor to the city’s tourism economy due to the large number of international and domestic cruise ships that use the port.

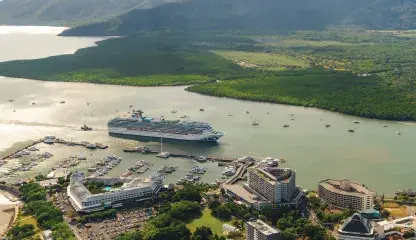
Port of Cairns in Trinity Inlet with the marina in the foreground, 2025

Passenger vessels berth at Trinity Wharf at the northern end of the port. The southern end of the port, the main cargo area, handles 1.16 million tonnes of cargo yearly. Bulk cargoes include sugar and molasses (exports) and fertiliser, petroleum and LPG (imports). The port plays an important role in providing supplies to coastal communities on the Cape York Peninsula, Torres Strait and the Gulf of Carpentaria.

== Cairns Marlin Marina ==
The Cairns Marlin Marina is located at the entrance to Trinity Inlet near 'The Pier' Shopping Centre (16.9193°S 145.7817°E). It contains 261 berths and can accommodate vessels up to 140 metres in length. Many private yachts and catamarans are based at the marina, as well as a significant number of commercial tourism operators who provide tours to the Great Barrier Reef.

== Cityport ==
Cityport is an urban renewal development occurring at the southern end of the Cairns CBD adjacent to the seaport and centred on Trinity Wharf.

== Skardon River Port at Mapoon ==
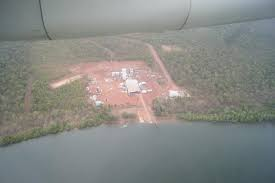
Aerial view, Port of Skardon River, 2015

The port at Skardon River in Mapoon in the Shire of Cook was declared in February 2002. It has a barge ramp and is used for the export of bauxite. It is approximately 10 kilometres (6.2 mi) upstream from the mouth of the Skardon River into the Gulf of Carpentaria (11.7580°S 142.0707°E).

== Quintell Beach Port at Lockhart River ==
The port at Quintell Beach is approximately 2 kilometres (1.2 mi) SSE of the town of Lockhart River in the Aboriginal Shire of Lockhart River. It has a barge facility from the beach into the Coral Sea (12.7947°S 143.3600°E). It serves the Lockhart River community and nearby pastoral stations.

== Thursday Island Port ==
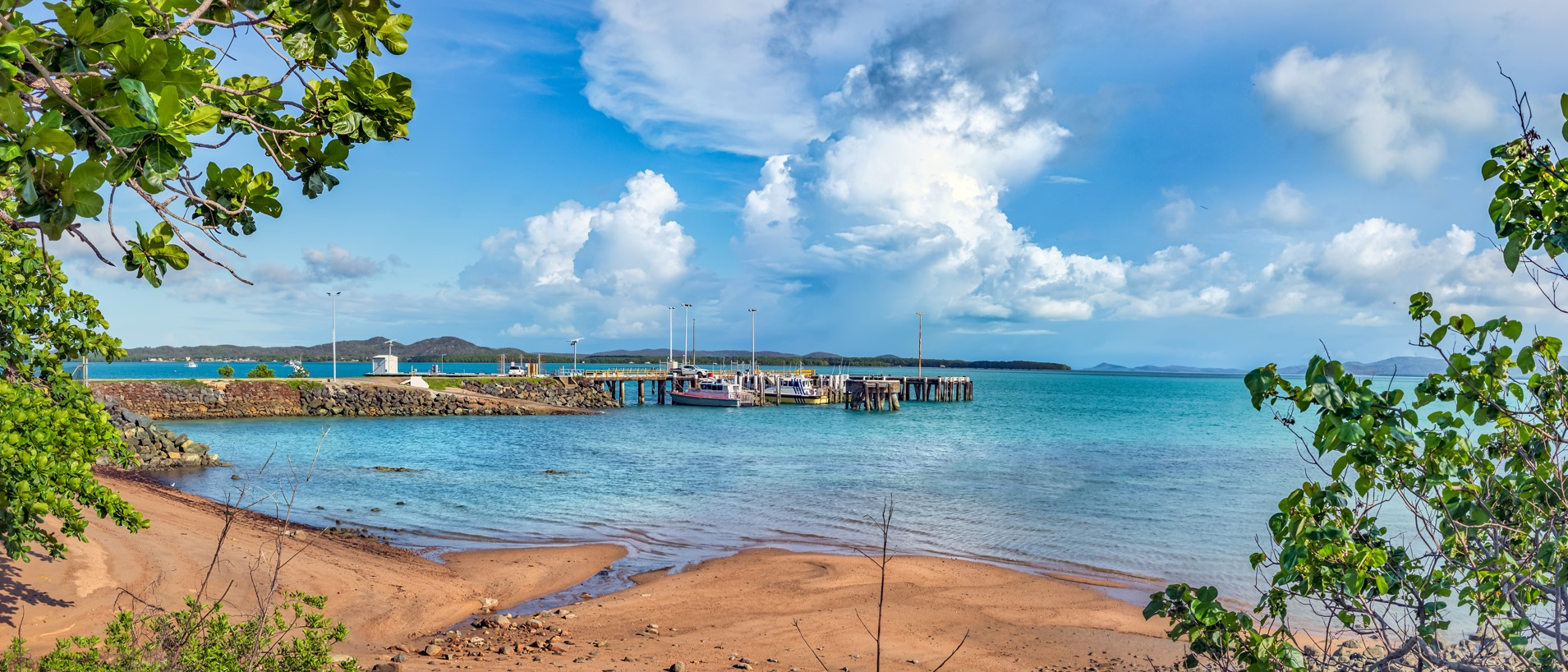
Thursday Island wharves, 2025

Ports North operates two wharf areas in the Torres Strait (10.589°S 142.233°E), one on Thursday Island and the other on nearby Horn Island (which also has an airport), both in the Shire of Torres. These islands serve as transport hubs to other islands in the Torres Strait.

== Burketown Port ==
The port at Burketown in the Shire of Burke is around the mouth of the Albert River where it enters the Gulf of Carpentaria (17.5670°S 139.7596°E). Although declared as a port area, no commercial shipping takes place.

== Karumba Port ==
The port at Karumba in the Shire of Carpentaria is around the mouth of the Norman River where it enters the Gulf of Carpentaria (17.482°S 140.8368°E). Most of the wharves are located in the Norman River at the town of Karumba. The port is used for the export of minerals, seafood, and cattle and for the import of goods needed by local communities, including those on Mornington Island.

== Cape Flattery Port ==
The port at Cape Flattery is in Lizard (an offshore locality) within the Shire of Cook, immediately offshore from Hope Vale in the Aboriginal Shire of Hope Vale (14.9865°S 145.3547°E). It is on the Coral Sea off the east coast of the Cape York Peninsula, approx 55 kilometres (34 mi) north of Cooktown. It has a 500-metre (1,600 ft) jetty with conveyor belt to load ships with silica sand from the Cape Flattery mine. It has a second wharf for import of fuel and other supplies needed by the mine.

== Cooktown Port ==
The port at Cooktown is around the mouth of the Endeavour River into the Coral Sea in the Shire of Cook, offshore from the town of Cooktown (15.4593°S 145.2499°E). It mostly services cruise ships and tourist vessels.

== Mourilyan Port ==
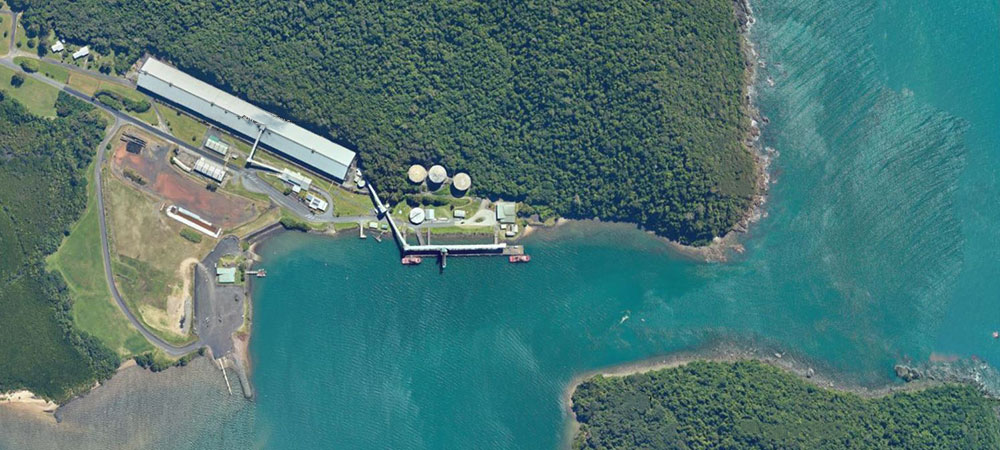
Mourilyan Harbour port facilities, 2023

The port of Mourilyan is around the mouth of the Moresby River into the Coral Sea in the locality of Mourilyan Harbour in the Cassowary Coast Region (17.5998°S 146.1245°E). The port exports raw sugar and molasses, iron ore, and livestock.

== See also ==
- List of Queensland government agencies
