= Cairns Wharf Complex =

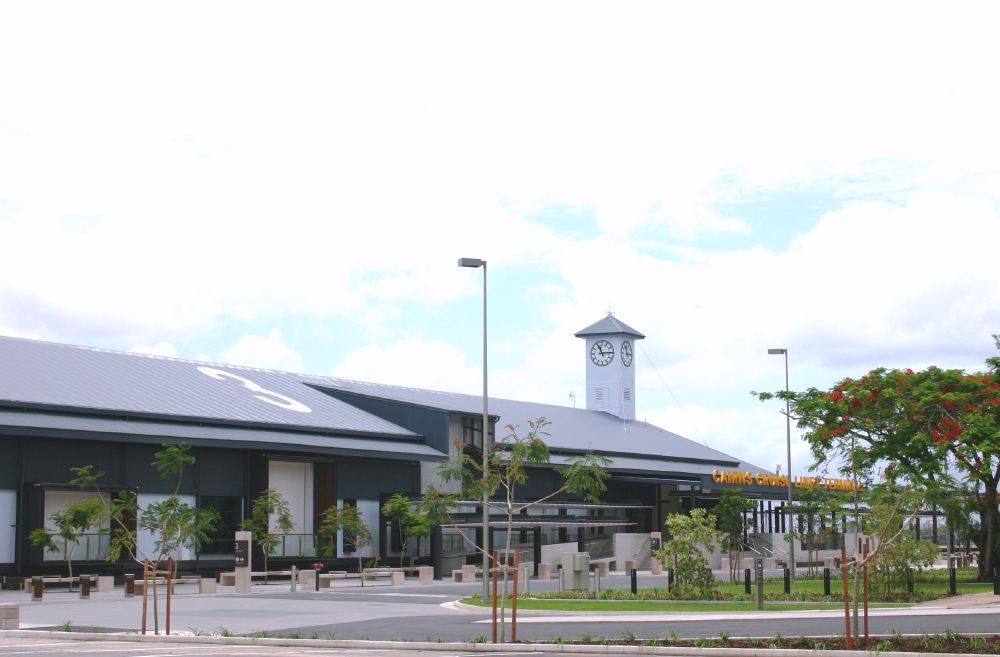
- Cairns Wharf Complex, 2010

- Location within Queensland Location within Australia
- 16.9273°S 145.78°E
- Location: Wharf Street, Cairns City, Cairns, Cairns Region, Queensland, Australia

History
- Design period: 1900–1914 (early 20th century)
- Built: 1910–1948

Queensland Heritage Register
- Official name: Cairns Wharf Complex
- Type: state heritage (built)
- Designated: 17 December 1999
- Reference no.: 601790
- Significant period: 1910–1964 (historical)
- Significant components: wharf/dock/quay, views to, platform, views from, tower – clock, shed/s, loading bay/dock, railway, shed – storage, machinery/plant/equipment – transport – water

Cairns Wharf Complex is a heritage-listed wharf at Wharf Street, Cairns City, Cairns, Cairns Region, Queensland, Australia. It was built from 1910 to 1948. It was added to the Queensland Heritage Register on 17 December 1999.

== History ==
Cairns was established by Europeans as a port in the second half of the nineteenth century. European passengers and government officials landed at Trinity Inlet on 3 October 1876, and the inlet was subsequently declared a port of entry and clearance on 1 November that year. The township of Cairns was surveyed in late 1876. The impetus for the establishment of the port came largely from the newly- established Hodgkinson goldfields.

Upon settlement, rudimentary port facilities were constructed. These initially consisted of timber jetties with piles built out across the mud and mangroves to boats moored in deeper water. Most had an attached shed. Better facilities quickly replaced these early structures as they wore out or simply fell down. Generally these were privately constructed by shipping and trading companies such as Howard Smith, Burns Philp and AUSN. The town, including shops, hotels, warehouses, banks, the customs house and other government offices developed around the port area.

In 1884, Cairns was selected as the rail terminus for the Herberton tin fields and construction of the Tablelands rail line west was begun. This assisted the fortunes of the port and in effect secured the future of the town. A timber railway wharf was built in 1886, connecting the wharf directly to the rail line into the hinterland. The other early northern port settlements of Cooktown and Port Douglas dwindled as a result of Cairns' railway connection. Each had previously threatened the position of Cairns as a port in the north.

In 1906 the Cairns Harbour Board was instituted, chiefly to commission and oversee improvements to the port. The private wharves were progressively acquired by the harbour board and by 1915 it owned all the wharves. Regular dredging of the channel was carried out, allowing larger vessels to enter the port after 1912.

Soon after taking over control of the Cairns wharves, the Harbour Board began planning for an extensive new system of wharfage extending along the shoreline in one unbroken length. The wharves were to be built in stages of reinforced concrete to the plans of Gummow Forest and Co of Sydney. Supervision of the project was given to Edward Gregory Waters, the Harbour Board's Chief Engineer. E.G. Waters worked as an architect, surveyor and engineer at various locations in north Queensland from 1890, working in Cairns from 1909 until 1917. In 1910 construction started on the first wharf, 300 feet (91 m) in length, at the end of Lake Street (number 3 wharf). This wharf was finished by 1912. Further stages were commenced shortly after, and by 1915 there was an unbroken frontage of 1,200 feet (370 m) of concrete wharves in Cairns. In the early 1920s, loans totalling £50 000 allowed the harbour board to further extend the wharves, and by 1925 the concrete wharves were 1,500 feet (460 m) long. A railway was extended along the front of the wharf. By the end of the 1920s another concrete wharf with rail approach and shed was erected, separate from the others on the other side of Lily Creek. It was initially known as number 6 wharf, and later number 8 wharf. Cairns was the first port in Queensland to adopt reinforced concrete wharves to any extent.

Cairns introduced a mechanical system of handling bagged sugar in the mid 1920s, one of the first Queensland ports to do so. A storage shed was constructed as part of this system, capable of storing 6000 to 7,500 long tons (7,600 t) of sugar. It later became known as "White's Shed".

Sheds were constructed on top of the main wharves to accommodate goods waiting for export or to be distributed around the town. One shed was built for each of the five berths. The sheds at berths 1–3 were joined together in one continuous line; sheds 4–5 were built as one long structure. In 1938 the Cairns Harbour Board produced a handbook, detailing its activities in the port. This handbook described the wharfage facilities at Cairns as comprising some 1,900 linear feet of reinforced concrete wharves, with six "airy spacious sheds having floor space of 89,020 square feet", as well as the shed for sugar storage. Electric and hand powered cranes were also built at the rear of the wharves to lift heavy goods onto ships.

During World War II Cairns was the centre of a great deal of activity. At the port, the wharves were extended again in 1943 to create six continuous berths, and a shed was built and became number 6 shed. Also during the 1940s, a building was constructed for the Waterside Workers, for use as an amenities hall. It housed lunch and meeting rooms, showers and toilets. This building was located on the western side of Wharf Street between Lake and Grafton Streets. It was demolished in the 1990s. In 1942, extensions were made to number 5 wharf with a new shed being erected.

A clock tower above number 3 shed was constructed in 1948. It was reported in the 1948 Annual Report of the Cairns Harbour Board "[t]he electric striking clock was long felt want, particularly on the water-front". The Cairns Post carried a photo of the clock on its front page on 23 September 1948 with the caption that it "is a valuable asset to the port". The clock was manufactured by A.L. Franklin of Sydney at a final cost of £900. Access to the clock mechanism was originally achieved via a ladder on the roof of the shed. Subsequently, a hole was cut in the office immediately below the clock making it easier to periodically change the car battery.

Many hundreds of people have been employed on the waterfront in Cairns over the years. Most working activity at the Cairns wharves has shifted upstream to newer wharf developments, including the bulk sugar terminals, built in the 1960s. These earlier wharves are used mainly for recreational vessels and passenger liners, but not to the capacity or extent that they were used in the past.

In 2010, a redevelopment project commenced on the wharves, including the adaptive re-use of Number 3 wharf shed as the new Cairns Cruise Liner Terminal.

=== Concrete Wharves ===
Replacement of the timber wharves with concrete ones proceeded progressively starting in about 1910. This commenced with the manufacture of 67 concrete piles and foundation dredging. Plans were for each section of the wharf to be 300 feet (91 m) long by 90 feet (27 m) wide with a shed 240 feet (73 m) long by 60 feet (18 m) wide built directly onto each wharf. Reclamation was to take place behind the sea wall at the back of the wharf with mud from the dredge stiffened with the stone and mullock from the range railway after slips took place. The number 3 wharf was erected by 1912, number two wharf opened in 1913, and in 1914 the old number 4 wharf and buildings were demolished and replaced with a concrete wharf.

A photograph is available of the number 4 wharf during this reconstruction phase. The piles are reinforced concrete and the upper ends were apparently poured in-place in stages around four vertical iron rods. The iron reinforcing rods in the vertical posts were designed to interlock with the reinforcing rods in the concrete deck supports. Eight piles were placed between the sea wall area and the seaward edge of the wharf. Substantial wooden formwork was necessary to construct the reinforced concrete superstructure to support the decking.

The Harbour Board purchased the timber number 1 wharf in 1915, and replaced this with a concrete wharf within a year. The number 5 wharf was constructed in 1925 and was the entry/exit point for railway lines extending onto the wharf deck. Plans indicate that the number 5 wharf's deck had two pairs of railway tracks which merged at the junction with the number 4 wharf. The tracks curved onto the wharf deck at the southern end of the number 5 wharf, and the corner of the wharf was truncated parallel to this curve.

Number 6 wharf was completed in 1942 by the Allied Works Council. The design employed in constructing this wharf differed markedly to that used to construct numbers 1 to 5.: number 6 wharf was built with timber, supplemented with reinforced concrete.

=== Numbers 2 and 3 wharf sheds, clock tower and cargo crane ===
The Wharf Sheds were constructed at various stages throughout the first half of the twentieth century.

The first to be built were numbers 2 and 3 wharf cargo sheds, constructed on the decks of the concrete wharves. The number 3 wharf was constructed in 1912, and it is suspected that the number 3 wharf shed was constructed in late 1912 or early 1913. The number 2 wharf was constructed in 1912–1913, and the original sheds on the old timber wharf were retained as long as possible prior to being demolished in 1913. The number 2 wharf shed was constructed soon after this demolition. The numbers 2 and 3 sheds were connected by a continuous roof by 1925 and probably earlier. Much of the infrastructure related to the number 2 and 3 sheds was constructed in about 1913, including the nearby railway tracks and two 10-ton cranes adjacent to the tracks and immediately behind sheds 1 and 2. Loading platforms were constructed behind number 2 wharf shed by 1925. The wharf sheds were elevated above the surrounding dock land and wharves. This raised configuration of wharf sheds was considered to be state-of-the-art design which allowed easy loading and unloading of goods to and from railway cars and into the storage sheds (facilitated by wharf shed platforms that aligned to the height of the rail cars). An "awning" was installed to the rear of the number 2 wharf shed in 1942. The wharf shed roofs were cleaned and repainted in 1947, and the whole of the roof cladding was replaced in 1954. The northern end of the number 2 wharf shed is referred to as the "old engine room" on a 1978 plan.

A clock tower was added to the end of the number 3 wharf shed in 1947–1948. On 14 September 1948, the Cairns Post included the following details of the clock:

The four dials are each six feet in diameter and are driven by a single central unit. They cannot show a different time on each face.

The bell weighs half a ton, is three feet in diameter and is struck by a 20 pound hammer.

The clock is operated electrically, but does not depend on the continuity of the mains. Timekeeping is kept by a pendulum weighing 100 lbs., which pushes the mechanism round with a force capable of overcoming all normal obstacles, yet it is so delicately powered that it takes only a fraction of the current an ordinary electric torch would consume.

The only part of the clock which would stop if electricity failed would be the bell, operated by a one quarter horse power motor directly connected to the mains. As soon as current is restored it will pick up the correct hour automatically. It is intended to silence the chimes between mid-night and 5.30 a.m.

There are 27 gear wheels in the clock and about 30 bal bearings, which are heavy enough for hundreds of years of wear.

Mr Franklin says that the clock is similar to that designed and installed by him for the Townsville Harbour Board in 1940 and others he has constructed during the last 25 years, though each successive clock has incorporated some refinement in design.

Throughout the interwar years, a shed was built for each of the other berths. The sheds at berths 1–3 were joined together in one continuous line; and sheds 4–5 were built as one long structure. In 1943, shed number 6 was constructed.

In more recent times, viewing platforms were installed above the original roof line of number 2 wharf shed. The platforms were used as part of the terminal facilities for overseas passengers. These platforms were removed sometime in 1998 or 1999.

In 1984, number 1 wharf shed was demolished as part of the Trinity Wharf development, and in the 1990s number 4 wharf shed was demolished to provide greater wharf space. Wharf sheds 5 and 6 have also been demolished.

=== White's Shed ===
The sugar storage shed was constructed in 1923. An electrical conveyor system was installed in the shed to move sugar bags to and from ships' holds and railway wagons, and was fully operational by 1926. The system consisted of an inclined covered conveyor extending from railway tracks on the west side of the shed up to the shed's roofline. This conveyor provided the linkage with the wharf railway system. A complicated set of conveyors and chutes was built into the roof of the sugar shed, and this system was used to stack bagged sugar at a rate of up to 80 long tons (81 t) per hour. A second conveyor extended between the roof of the sugar shed eastwards to the roof of number 4 wharf shed. This conveyor joined another in a T-configuration on the eastern side of the wharf shed's roof. The overhead conveyors from White's Shed to number 3 wharf were reconstructed in 1946, while maintenance and repairs to both "shore and floating plant" were made in 1947. The 27-year-old facility was apparently modernised during the overhaul. Two travelling gantry cranes moved up and down the number 4 wharf's edge, loading and unloading the sugar bags into ship's holds via a set of conveyors mounted on the gantry cranes and connected to the T-conveyor.

Electric travelling cranes were located immediately adjacent to the northern end and western side of the building during this era. These cranes moved "sinker" logs from the railway tracks to the edge of the wharf between the numbers 3 and 4 wharf sheds.

The usefulness of the shed and log handling machinery declined in the late 1950s, and White's Shed was no longer in operation after the bulk sugar terminal was established at Portsmith in 1964. At this new terminal, huge volumes of sugar could be stored and delivered directly into the holds of ships, without needing to be packed into bags or other containers. This new method of sugar handling reduced significantly the wharf labour force for sugar. The sinker log crane on the west side of the shed was sold in 1959 and was later used at Rankine's Peeramon Mill, near Lake Eacham on the Atherton Tablelands, where it currently resides. The disused White's Shed was subsequently leased to mining companies, perhaps as early as the 1960s. The shed was used to store copper concentrate from the Red Dome mine between 1993 and 1997, and was leased to the Dianne Copper Mine prior to this. The name "White's Shed" derives from this period.

=== The electrical workshop ===
The existing electrical workshop building is situated in the former location of the harbour workshops. The original workshops contained the fitter's and turner's shop and the blacksmith shop. This building was apparently demolished in about 1940, and the existing brick structure was built in this location in 1951. The rear shed was built and/or modified in 1967.

The existing building was used to supply power to the wharves, and as an electrical workshop. During its years as a powerhouse, the building contained a compressor, an emergency power generator, and transformers. A compressor was installed in 1955 to supply air to the wharves, and it was in this year that electrical workshop equipment was installed. The workshop maintained 21 cranes, fork lifts, and two stevedoring units. The workshop was still in use by 1958 and possibly later.

=== Amenities ===
The Amenities Hall was built in 1954 for the Waterside Workers' Federation. The rear structure addition is possibly a "septic block" installed in 1956. The 1954 plan of the building shows the arrangement of the amenities, with the front two-thirds of the building filled with tables and the rear containing the amenities themselves.

The building has housed collections of the Maritime Archaeological Association of Far North Queensland since 1988. A loading door is present in the front end of the building, and was reportedly added after 1988 so that large maritime artefacts could be easily moved into the structure.

=== Number 2 gate, flagpole and planters ===
A 1942 map of the wharf complex shows four traffic gates to the wharf complex fronting Wharf Street. It is suspected that these gateways were in place since the early history of the wharves. The number 2 gateposts at the number 2 gate are still in their original locations.

An octagonal three-tiered flagpole base was present at the eastern end of the existing garden bed. The flagpole base was concrete, and each tier was of decreasing diameter and height. The edge was bevelled. The base measured 1.2 metres (3 ft 11 in) across and 0.3 metres (1 ft 0 in) high, and the flagpole was once affixed by four bolts. This base was removed during maintenance activities in March 1999. Another flagpole base was constructed in July 1953.

=== Concrete roadways ===
Concrete roadways were constructed on the reclaimed land behind numbers 1, 2 and 3 wharves in 1945 and 1946. The roads constructed in 1945 extended behind the wharves from number 1 to number 6 and the remainder of the concrete roads were presumably constructed in 1946.

=== Harbour Board Store ===
The Cairns Harbour Board Store (no longer extant) is clearly visible in 1920–1930 and 1940 aerial photographs of the area. The building was originally a bond store used by Customs to house beer, alcohol, and tobacco. The floor reportedly had a steel floor during this period to prevent theft. In recent years the building housed Coxen Chemicals (a detergent manufacturer) and Rothfire Pty Ltd (a prawn merchant). The building was either moved in the last decade to the modern workshop area or was demolished to make way for the bitumen carpark.

=== Railway tracks ===
Several railway tracks were laid at the Cairns wharves. The existing railway lines were laid at approximately the same time as the concrete wharves. One section of the line supported a 10-ton travelling crane, and another section, a travelling crane used to sort and load logs onto the parallel railway tracks.

Rail links with the Cairns hinterland were a key element of the success of Cairns as the regional port and consequently, as a viable town.

=== Amenities Hall park ===
The park north of the Amenities Hall was once the location of several small structures. A 1942 plan of the area indicates that the "Pay Office" and a "Kiosk", both built in c. 1930 were present in the park area at that time. A "Tally Clerk's" office, built in c. 1930 was adjacent to the railway line behind the wharves. These buildings were apparently replaced by two small sheds prior to 1967, and the small sheds were themselves removed between 1972 and 1975.

== Description ==
The Cairns Wharves and associated structures are bordered by Wharf Street to the west and the waters of Trinity Inlet to the east. Located to the north and south of the site are various structures associated with maritime activities. The Cairns Wharfage Complex site includes concrete wharves 2 and 3; wharf sheds 2 and 3 and the clock tower above shed 3; White's (sugar) shed; an electrical shop; an amenities hall; a cargo crane; concrete roadways; railway tracks; and number 2 gate, flagpole and planters.

=== Concrete wharves ===
The concrete wharves are part of the actively utilised wharf facilities in this part of the Cairns waterfront.

The wharf is decked in reinforced concrete which forms an integral part of the structure. The deck edge is marked by a discontinuous wooden beam. A series of concrete sections measuring about 3 metres (9.8 ft) long are immediately adjacent to the beam and extend the length of the wharf. The concrete sections are interrupted at regular intervals by metal boxes containing power points. Water taps are present at regular intervals, and plumbing, electrical conduits, and compressed air pipes are affixed to the underside of the wharf. Mooring irons are mounted to the deck surface behind the concrete buffers. A variety of types of mooring irons are present.

=== Numbers 2 and 3 wharf sheds, clock tower and cargo crane ===
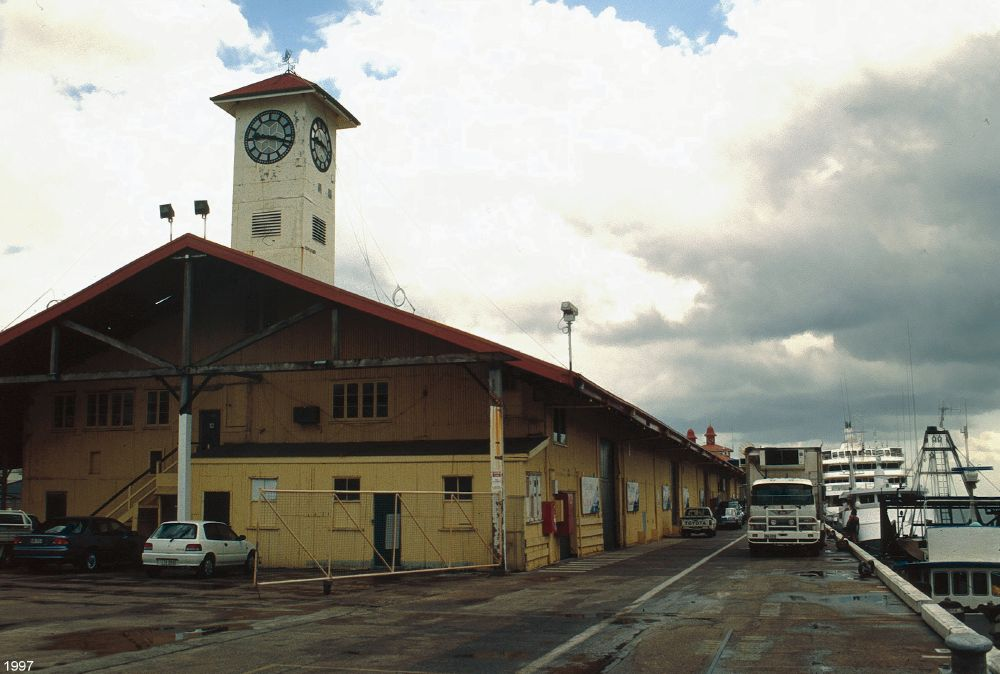
Sheds 2 and 3 with clock tower, 1997

The number 2 and 3 wharf sheds are long, rectangular buildings, clad with corrugated sheeting. The structures have truss-framed roofs with support posts along the long edges and down the centre. The walls have timber rails spanning between the posts and numerous door and window openings within the framing. Like the walls, the roofs are clad with corrugated sheeting. Aside from clearly modern replacement sections, the wall cladding - much of which is affixed with lead-head nails of various sizes - appears to be the original.

The buildings are in good condition, particularly given their age, location. exposure and past industrial usage. However the framing at the southern end of number 3 wharf shed exhibits signs of accelerated deterioration due to exposure to the weather. The covered area between the number 2 and number 3 wharf sheds appears to remain in a condition similar to that when it was originally constructed.

The loading dock behind number 2 wharf shed is largely intact and consists of an array of heavily maintained timber and concrete piles supporting a concrete deck. It is aligned perpendicular to the railway tracks. The loading dock remnant existing behind number 3 wharf shed consists of rectangular, round, or half-round decking support timbers placed on log or concrete piers. This loading dock also has a concrete deck.

The southern end of the wharf shed number 3 is surmounted by a clock tower. A clock face is located on all four sides of the tower. The tower is capped with a pyramidal roof and weather vane. A door providing internal access to the clock is located on the northern wall of the tower. Vents are located on all sides of the tower, close to the base. The clock appears to be in good working order and still chimes on the hour.

The number 2 wharf shed is currently used as the Cairns cruise ship terminal. Number 3 wharf shed contains storage areas for the Port Authority, storage for other shipping operators, and offices for the Customs Service.

The cargo crane is present at the end of the loading dock attached to the rear of number 2 wharf shed. The crane is mounted on a large 12-sided concrete base. The crane's I-beam jibs are stamped "NORMAN LONG AND CO LD/MIDDLESBROUGH/ENGLAND". The hoist consists of a cargo hook suspended by a steel cable. The cable winding drum is timber and largely intact. A commemorative bronze plaque is installed at the base of the crane.

=== White's Sugar Shed ===
White's Shed is a large timber-and-iron structure situated behind number 4 wharf (not included in the listing boundary) and immediately southwest of the existing number 3 wharf shed. The building consists of the original section measuring approximately 63 metres (207 ft) long (oriented parallel to the wharf) and 22 metres (72 ft) wide, and the post-1976 addition. The cladding on the two sections overlap somewhat, and the complete width of the existing shed is about 38 metres (125 ft). A fence encloses the immediate surrounds to the northern side of the shed.

The basic structure of White's Shed appear to be largely intact, including much of the sugar bag stacking apparatus on the ceiling. However, the portions of the sugar conveyor located outside of the shed are no longer extant.

White's Shed is timber framed. Thirteen transverse frames support the roof, which are in turn linked by a ridge beam, purlins and girts, a wall top plate, and diagonal wall braces. Large double doors are present in the ends of the building and central on the east and west walls. These doors are supported by I-beams. The roof is gabled and has a ventilated ridge. A complex system of conveyors and hopper chutes for the delivery of sugar bags is present attached to the ceiling of the structure. The building's wall and roof cladding is of recently installed corrugated sheeting. A secure room is present along the inside of the north wall.

A recent building report and contamination assessment revealed that the structural integrity of the building has been compromised by termites, and that a low level of heavy metals contamination is present.

=== Electrical workshop ===
The Electrical workshop consists of a brick structure located immediately north of White's Shed. The building measures approximately 20 metres (66 ft) long and 12 metres (39 ft) wide, and has an 8 by 4 metres (26 by 13 ft) shed in the rear (west) yard. The building is currently the Cairns Port Authority's Social Club.

The building's walls are cavity brick. The structure was constructed on a concrete slab and covered by a gabled roof. Five 4-paned windows extend down the northern side of the building. The windows are constructed with concrete lintels and sills. Four windows extend down the eastern end. A boarded-over attic window is also present. The south side of the building is marked by loading doors and four windows and this area is landscaped and modified for social functions. The western end of the building is marked by large access doors, a window, a doorway, and an attic window.

The shed at the rear of the building consists of a brick section and a section covered in iron cladding. This shed currently contains the compressor installed in 1955. This machinery continues to supply compressed air to the wharves.

The electrical workshop is not considered of cultural heritage significance.

=== Amenities Hall ===
The Amenities Hall consists of a timber-framed structure located immediately north of the Electrical Shop. The building measures about 28 metres (92 ft) long and 8 metres (26 ft) wide, and has a small 2 by 2 metres (6 ft 7 in by 6 ft 7 in) structure added to the rear. The building houses the collections of the Maritime Archaeological Association of Far North Queensland.

The building is a timber framed, gable-roofed structure placed on a concrete slab. The wall cladding consists of angular-rebated chamferboards. The original asbestos roof is in place. A loading door is present in the front (east) end of the building. The north and south walls of the building are symmetrically arranged with three double doors and five 6-paned windows down each side. Three 3-paned windows are present on the addition at the building's rear (west) end. Some of the original tables and benches, and the toiletries block are still in place.

The Amenities Hall is not considered of cultural heritage significance.

=== Number 2 gate, flagpole and planters ===
The ornamental gateposts at the number 2 gate are still in their original locations. The gateway consists of an entrance and exit lane separated by a concrete ornamental wall measuring about 2.5 metres (8 ft 2 in) wide and 4 metres (13 ft) tall. A concrete post flanks each side of the wall, and two gate hooks are affixed to each post. An ornamental coping is present on top of the wall. Low-relief Art Deco-style ornamentations are present on the wall faces, posts, and coping. Two matching single concrete posts are present on the opposite side of the entrance and exit lanes. These are also affixed with gate hooks, indicating that the original gates were double-hung and latched in the middle. The gates themselves are no longer present.

The entrance and exit lanes inside the wharf compound are separated by a concrete-bordered garden bed. A flagpole base is present behind the entrance wall at the western end of the garden bed.

Only the concrete gateway and side posts are deemed to be of cultural heritage significance. The concrete planter and flagpole are not considered culturally significant.

=== Concrete roadways ===
The western edge of the 1945 concrete roadway is still visible, but the remainder is apparently underneath recent bitumen. Concrete U-shaped guttering is visible in front of the Amenities Hall and the Electrical Workshop, and may date to the original installation of the concrete roadway.

The concrete roadway presumably dating to 1946 consists of the entrance and exit lanes at the number 2 gate. The lane on the south side is pitched down the middle to ensure water drains to either side.

The concrete roadways are not considered of cultural heritage significance.

=== Harbour Board store foundation ===
Concrete slabs are present in the parking area immediately north of the number 2 gate roadway. The southernmost of these borders a landscaped area adjacent to the roadway on the south and merges with the 1945 roadway on the east. The western edge angles southwest towards the northern gate post. The outline of the northern edged of the slab is marked by two angular "bays". The northernmost slab consists of a strip of concrete extending east-west about 14 metres (46 ft) north of the first slab. The intervening area is now covered with bitumen, by 20 low "humps" are discernible. These are the remains of concrete support piers arranged in a block measuring 5 piers by 4 piers. These piers mark the location of the "Cairns Harbour Board Store" or "Beer Shed".

The Harbour Board Store foundation is not of cultural heritage significance.

=== Railway tracks ===
Portions of two sets of tracks are visible. The portion of the first set within the area consists of a single set of double-rail tracks extending from the loading dock behind number 1 wharf southwards to the loading dock at the rear of number 3 wharf. The track extends past the original fixed 10-ton Cargo Crane behind the number 2 wharf. The tracks change from double-railed to single-railed near the southern end of the number 3 wharf loading dock.

A short section of the second railway tracks is still in place approximately 6 metres (20 ft) west of the number 2 gate. Two sets of tracks spaced 3 metres (9.8 ft) apart are present in this location. Both sets are double-railed.

=== Amenities Hall park ===
Two concrete-bordered planters are present along the northern edge of the park. These planters are similar to the one currently located between the two vehicle lanes which pass through the number 2 gate.

The Amenities Hall Park is not considered of cultural heritage significance.

== Heritage listing ==
Cairns Wharf Complex was listed on the Queensland Heritage Register on 17 December 1999 having satisfied the following criteria.

The place is important in demonstrating the evolution or pattern of Queensland's history.

The Cairns Wharf Complex is of importance in demonstrating the evolution of Queensland's history as it represents an important stage of development of Queensland and Australian wharf facilities dating from 1909 to 1942. The wharves are among the earliest Australian attempts to introduce the medium of reinforced concrete into wharf construction. The construction of number 6 wharf in 1942 demonstrates the importance of Cairns as a centre for Pacific forces during World War II, and its timber and reinforced concrete construction reflects war-time expediency. The wharf-side cargo sheds, numbers 2 and 3, are the most visible surviving remnant of the Cairns waterfront development in the early 1900s. The cargo crane is the last remaining crane from the earliest period of the wharf's history in the 1910s, and helps to convey a sense of the industrial maritime history of the wharves. White's (Sugar) Shed is a place which demonstrates an evolutionary stage of the North Queensland sugar industry and wharf practices dating to the 1920s through 1950s. The closure of the shed to sugar handling in the early 1960s was the result of the opening of Cairns bulk sugar terminal at Portsmith in 1964. The opening of the bulk terminals reduced significantly the wharf labour force required for the handling of sugar. The railway lines demonstrate the importance of rail links in establishing Cairns as the dominant regional port in far North Queensland, and consequently, as a viable town. The railway lines are also integral to an understanding of the operation of the wharves, with wharf shed platforms that aligned to the height of the rail cars.

The place demonstrates rare, uncommon or endangered aspects of Queensland's cultural heritage.

The Cairns wharf sheds, numbers 2 and 3 and White's (Sugar) Shed, demonstrate rare aspects of Queensland's cultural heritage as surviving wharf sheds are becoming increasingly rare throughout Australia as coastal cities revitalise their waterfront areas. White's shed, with its remnant bag-stacking machinery, is the only known example of this type of structure existing in Queensland and Australia, and as such also demonstrates rare aspects of Queensland's cultural heritage.

The place has potential to yield information that will contribute to an understanding of Queensland's history.

The remnant bag-stacking machinery located in White's shed has the potential to yield information that will contribute to an understanding of Queensland's history. Since records of the sugar bag conveyance apparatus have disappeared in the years since abandonment of the system, the intact features along the roof of the structure's interior offer insights which are only available through study of this physical feature.

The place is important in demonstrating the principal characteristics of a particular class of cultural places.

The number 2 and 3 wharf sheds are important in demonstrating the principle characteristics of a wharf-side cargo handling structure.

The place is important because of its aesthetic significance.

The Cairns wharves site is important because of its aesthetic significance as the wharves, number 2 gate, White's shed and wharf sheds, numbers 2 and 3, including the clock tower, contribute to the streetscape of inner-city Cairns. The wharves run at right angles to the main city streets of Cairns, terminating the long views down Abbott, Lake and Grafton streets south. These views are framed by the mountains and mangroves behind and across Trinity Inlet. The clock tower is particularly of aesthetic significance as a local landmark.

The place is important in demonstrating a high degree of creative or technical achievement at a particular period.

The concrete wharves are important in demonstrating a high degree of technical achievement in the early twentieth century. The use of reinforced concrete for wharf construction represents one of the earliest Australian attempts to introduce this material for wharf construction.

The place has a strong or special association with a particular community or cultural group for social, cultural or spiritual reasons.

The Cairns wharves, sheds 2 and 3 and White's (Sugar) Shed, number 2 gate and clock tower have a special association with the Cairns community as physical evidence of the city's history and sense of identity. The clock tower affixed to the roof of the number 3 wharf shed has provided a focus for this identity, and has functioned as the city's and wharf's timepiece since 1948.

The place has a special association with the life or work of a particular person, group or organisation of importance in Queensland's history.

The place has a special association with the work of the early Cairns Harbour Board. The wharves and sheds offer a physical reminder of the importance of the Board in establishing the maritime focus of the city and the development of the region.
