= Cairns City =

- Suburb
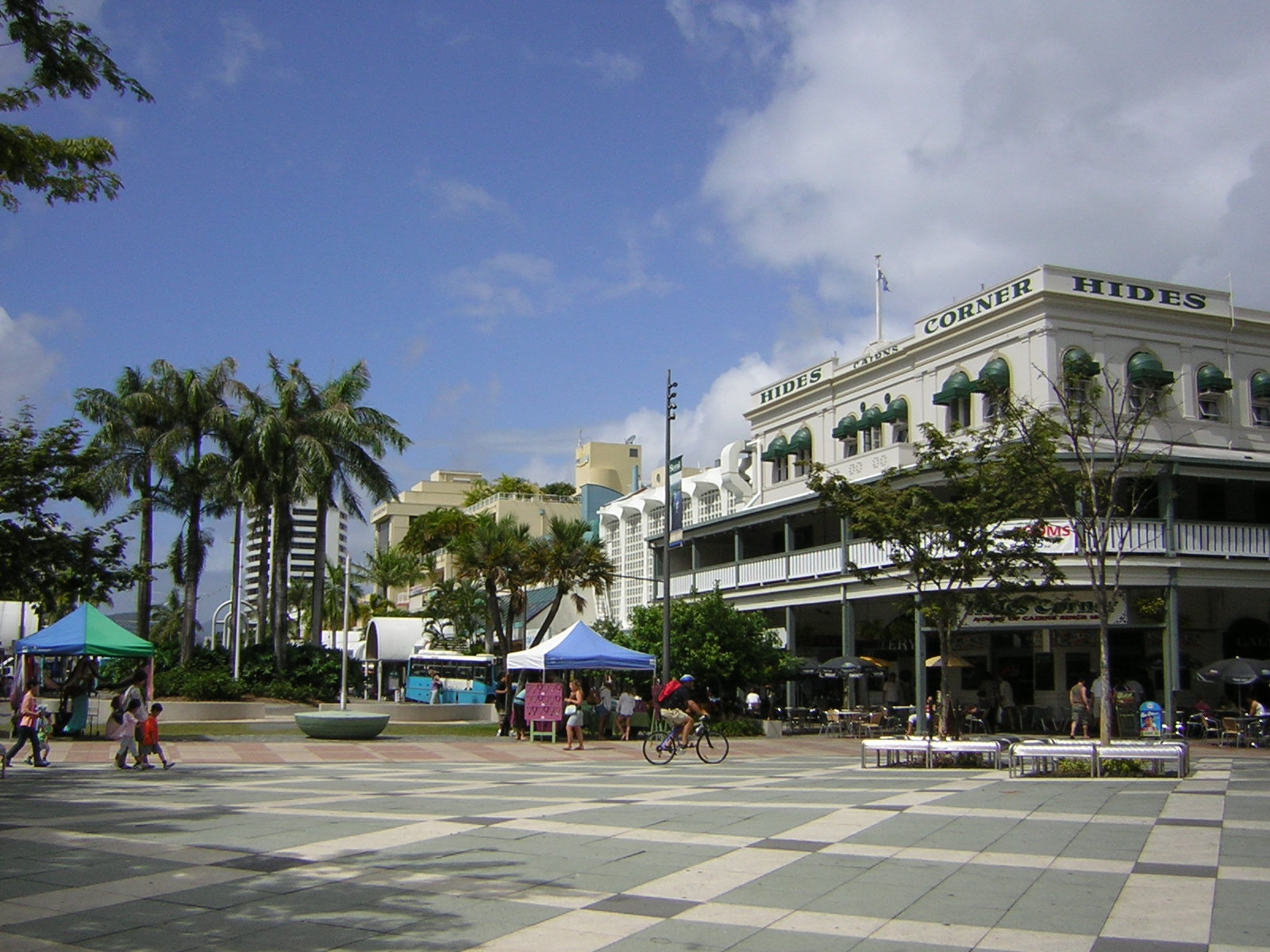
- Cairns City, 2005

- Interactive map of Cairns City
- Coordinates: 16.9233°S 145.7733°E
- Country: Australia
- State: Queensland
- City: Cairns
- LGA: Cairns Region
- Location: 347 km (216 mi) NNW of Townsville; 1,678 km (1,043 mi) NNW of Brisbane

Government
  - State electorate: Cairns
  - Federal division: Leichhardt

Area
  - Total: 3.7 km^{2} (1.4 sq mi)

Population
  - Total: 3,616 (2021 census)
  - Density: 977/km^{2} (2,530/sq mi)
- Time zone: UTC+10:00 (AEST)
- Postcode: 4870
Suburbs around Cairns City
Cairns North	Cairns North	Trinity Bay
Parramatta Park	Cairns City	East Trinity
Parramatta Park	Portsmith	East Trinity

Cairns City, also called Cairns CBD, is a coastal suburb (Note: "Suburb" in Australia refers to any defined non-rural neighbourhood, including city centre and exurban areas as well as "suburbs" in the narrower sense.) comprising the central business district (CBD) of Cairns in the Cairns Region, Queensland, Australia. In the 2021 census, Cairns City had a population of 3,616 people.

== Geography ==
The suburb is bounded to the north-west by Upward Street, to the north-east by Trinity Bay (16.9118°S 145.7818°E), to the east by Trinity Inlet (16.9264°S 145.7831°E), and the railway lines to the south. The North Coast railway line enters the suburb from the south (Portsmith) and then follows the suburb's south-west boundary to the Cairns railway station (16.9251°S 145.7707°E) where the line terminates. The Tablelands railway line commences at the railway station and continues to follow the south-west boundary to the westernmost point of the suburb, where it exits to the north-west (Cairns North).

Cairns Wharf railway station (16.9275°S 145.7799°E) is an abandoned railway station on an abandoned railway line at Cairns Wharf.

== History ==
Cairns City (CBD) is situated in the Yidinji traditional Aboriginal country.

Cairns State School opened on 19 August 1878. In 1914, the school was split into two separate schools, Cairns Boys State School and Cairns Girls and Infants State School. In 1943, the Girls and Boys schools were amalgamated to create Cairns Central State School, with the Infants school renamed Cairns Central State Infants School. In 1961, the Infants school was merged back into Cairns Central State School. It closed on 16 December 1994. The school was on the block surrounded by Abbott Street, Alpin Street, Lake Street and Florence Street (16.9192°S 145.7743°E).

St Monica's Catholic College was established in 1890 by the Sisters of Mercy.

Cairns Weekly Penny Savings Bank opened in Cairns City on 22 April 1899.

The name Cairns honours William Cairns, the Governor of Queensland from 1875 to 1877. The suburb was officially named Cairns City on 1 September 1973 by the Queensland Place Names Board.

On 20 April 1916, the Cane Beetles March commenced at Mooliba (now Mirriwinni). It was a snowball march to recruit men into the Australian Imperial Force during World War I at a time when enthusiasm to enlist had waned after the loss of life in the Gallipoli campaign. The march began at Mooliba with 4 men, passing through Babinda, Aloomba, Gordonvale, and Edmonton, and ending in Cairns 60 kilometers later with 29 recruits.

St John the Evangelist Anglican Church was dedicated and opened on Sunday 23 January 1927 by Archdeacon Robert Moline.

Cairns Baptist Church at 142 Lake Street was officially opened on Saturday 4 July 1936 by Reverend Ralph Sayce (General Secretary of the Queensland Baptist Union). The church was built from timber, but had four concrete buttresses to provide strength in the event of a cyclone. The architect was George Trotter. A manse (built earlier) was behind the church. A modern Baptist church now occupies the site.

The Cairns Seventh Day Adventist School opened on 6 February 1950 in the Cairns CBD. It later moved to premises at the Cairns Seventh Day Adventist Church at 302 Gatton Street, Manunda. On 27 October 2014, the school moved to purpose-built premises in Gordonvale and was renamed Cairns Adventist College.

The City Library opened in 1979.

== Demographics ==
In the 2011 census, Cairns City had a population of 2,180 people.

In the 2016 census, Cairns City had a population of 2,737 people. Aboriginal and Torres Strait Islander people made up 3.9% of the population. 42.7% of people were born in Australia. The next most common country of birth was England at 5.8%. 54.8% of people only spoke English at home. The most common response for religion was No Religion at 29.5%.

In the 2021 census, Cairns City had a population of 3,616 people.

== Heritage listings ==
The suburb of Cairns City has a number of heritage-listed sites, including:

- Dr EA Koch Memorial, Abbott Street
- Barrier Reef Hotel, Abbott Street
- Bishop's House, Abbott Street
- St Monica's High School Administration Building, Abbott Street
- former Cairns Customs House, 6A–8A Abbott Street
- Cairns Court House, 38–40 Abbott Street
- Cairns City Council Chambers, 151 Abbott Street
- St Joseph's Convent, 179 Abbott Street
- St Monica's War Memorial Cathedral, 183 Abbott Street
- Cairns Control Room, World War II Volunteer Defence Corps, Grafton Street
- former Cairns Chinatown, 99 Grafton Street
- Bolands Centre, Lake Street
- former Adelaide Steamship Co Ltd Building, 37 Lake Street
- former Central Hotel, 39–49 Lake Street
- Hides Hotel, 87 Lake Street
- former School of Arts, 93–105 Lake Street
- St Monica's Old Cathedral, Minnie Street
- Cairns Masonic Temple, 8 Minnie Street
- Cairns War Memorial, The Esplanade
- former Mulgrave Shire Council Chambers, 51 The Esplanade
- Cairns Wharf Complex, Wharf Street
- former Jack and Newell Building, 29 Wharf Street

== Education ==
St Monica's College is a Catholic secondary (7–12) school for girls at 177 Abbott Street (16.9174°S 145.7732°E). In 2018, the school had an enrolment of 672 students with 61 teachers (56 full-time equivalent) and 30 non-teaching staff (24 full-time equivalent).

There are no government schools in the suburb. The nearest government primary school is Parramatta State School in neighbouring Parramatta Park to the west. The nearest government secondary school is Cairns State High School in neighbouring Cairns North in the north-west.

The Cairns campus of the Central Queensland University is on the northern corner of Abbott Street and Shields Street (16.9209°S 145.7769°E).

== Facilities ==
Cairns Police Station is at 5 Sheridan Street (16.9263°S 145.7756°E) adjacent to the Cairns Courthouse (16.9267°S 145.7758°E).

Cairns Central Police Beat Shopfront is in within the Cairns Central Shopping Centre (16.9238°S 145.7715°E).

Cairns Post Office is at 38 Sheridan Street (16.9259°S 145.7760°E).

There are numerous health care facilities in the suburb, including:

- Cairns Day Surgery, a private day surgery hospital (16.9190°S 145.7719°E)
- Cairns Private Hospital, a private hospital (16.9155°S 145.7711°E)
- Cairns Haematology and Oncology Clinic (16.9161°S 145.7697°E)
- Far North Day Hospital, a private day hospital (16.9229°S 145.7719°E)
- Cairns Fertility Centre, a private day hospital (16.9229°S 145.7719°E)
- Calvary Hospital, a general hospital (16.9155°S 145.7710°E)
- Wuchopperen Surgery, a medical centre (16.9157°S 145.7696°E)
- Wallamurra Centre, a medical centre (16.9160°S 145.7716°E)

== Amenities ==
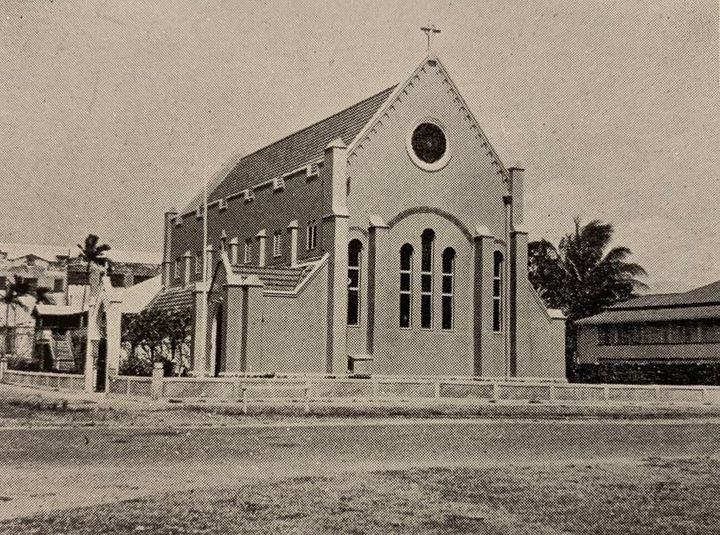
St John the Evangelist Anglican Church, circa 1954

Cairns Convention Centre is a performing arts centre (16.9276°S 145.7780°E).

The City Library is at 151 Abbott Street in the former Cairns City Council Chambers (16.9204°S 145.7752°E); it is operated by the Cairns Regional Council. A major refurbishment was undertaken in 1999 and a further minor refurbishment was implemented in 2011. Public accessible wifi is available. Current Library services and collections can be accessed from the Cairns Libraries website.

The Cairns Historical Society operates the Cairns Museum and Cairns Historical Society Resource Centre at the former Cairns School of Arts building on the corner of Lake and Shields Streets in Cairns City (16.922°S 145.7753°E).

Cairns Central is the largest shopping mall in Far North Queensland. It has 180 stores including department stores, supermarkets and cinemas. It is in McLeod Street between Spence Street and Aplin Street (16.9251°S 145.7718°E). Cairns railway station is within the complex.

Cairns Bank (formerly Cairns Penny Bank) operates its only branch at 24 Grafton Street (16.9256°S 145.7773°E).

St John The Evangelist Anglican Church is at 177 Lake Street (16.9170°S 145.7710°E).

St Andrew's Presbyterian Church is at 87 Sheridan Street (16.9215°S 145.7714°E).

Cairns Baptist Church is at 138-142 Lake Street (16.9161°S 145.7709°E).

Crosspoint Cairns Church is at 220 Toogood Road (16.9585°S 145.7263°E).

Table Tennis Cairns Stadium is at 99 Sheridan Street (16.9211°S 145.7711°E).

The Pier is a waterfront shopping and dining precinct on Pier Point Road (16.9198°S 145.7805°E).

Cairns Marlin Marina is a 10.2-hectare (25-acre) marina at 1 Spence Street extending into Trinity Bay (16.9191°S 145.7819°E). It has 261 berths and can accommodate super yachts up to 140 metres (460 ft) in length. It is home to many tourist and game fishing vessels. It is operated by Ports North.

There are a number of parks in the suburb, including:

- Grafton Street Park (16.9205°S 145.7718°E)
- Munro Martin Park (16.9191°S 145.7707°E)

== Attractions ==
Cairns Aquarium is at 5 Florence Street (16.9186°S 145.7736°E). It focuses on the plants and animals of the Great Barrier Reef and the Daintree Rainforest, both of which are World Heritage listed.

Reef Hotel Casino is at 35-41 Wharf Street (16.9235°S 145.7793°E). It provides accommodation, restaurants, entertainment and gambling. Cairns Wildlife Dome is (16.9231°S 145.7792°E) situated on top of the Reef Hotel Casino. It offers wildlife viewing, wildlife talks, and ropes courses.
