= Cairns School of Arts =

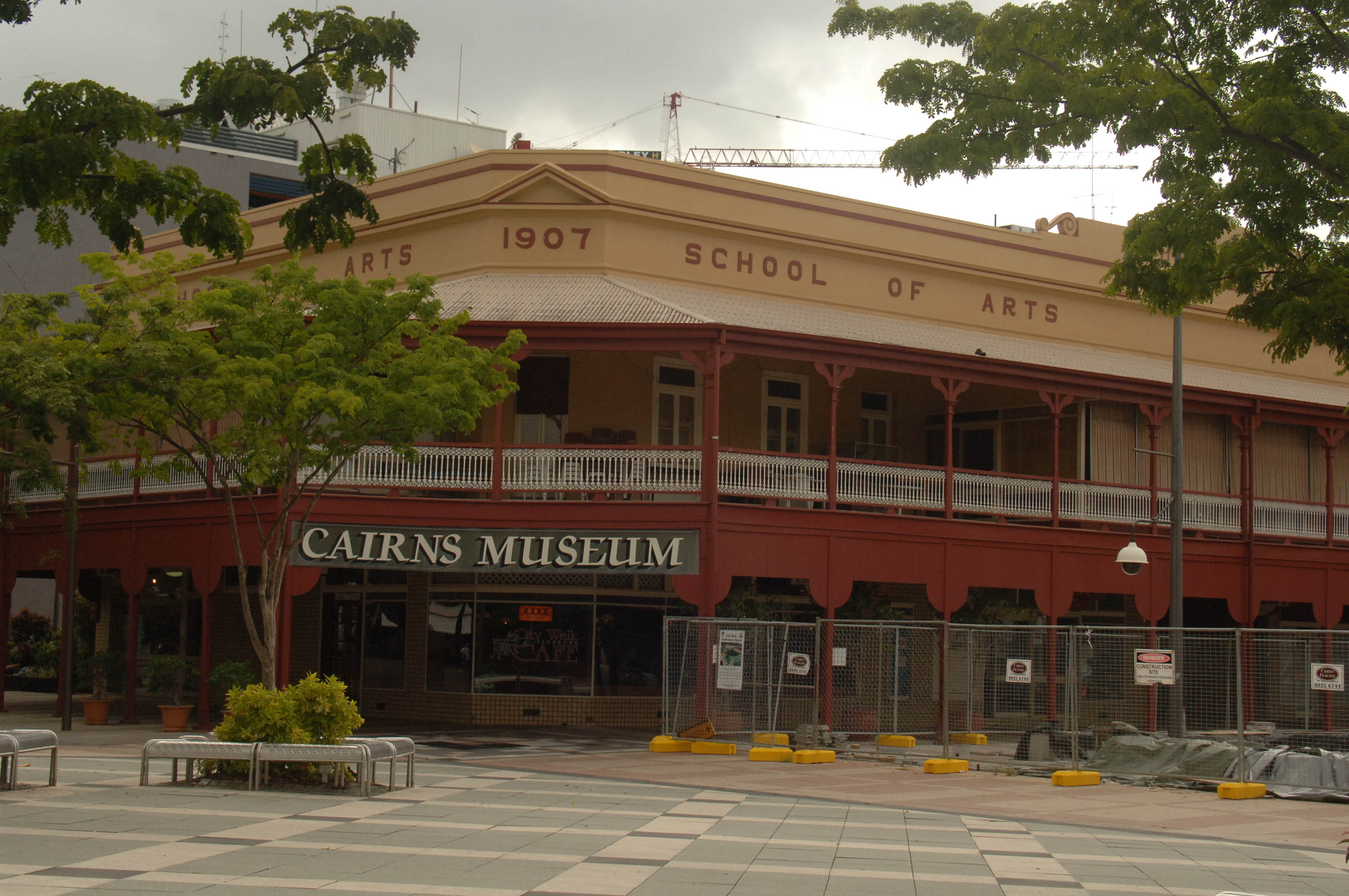
- Former Cairns School of Arts, converted into a museum, 2007

- Location within Queensland Location within Australia
- 16.922°S 145.7753°E
- Location: 93–105 Lake Street, Cairns City, Cairns, Cairns Region, Queensland, Australia

History
- Design period: 1900–1914 (early 20th century)
- Built: 1907–1941

Site notes
- Architect: Tunbridge, Tunbridge & Lynch
- Architectural style: Classicism

Queensland Heritage Register
- Official name: School of Arts, Cairns (former), Cairns Museum, Cairns School of Arts (former), Former School of Arts Building
- Type: state heritage (built)
- Designated: 21 October 1992
- Reference no.: 600380
- Significant period: 1907–1940 (fabric); 1907 – mid-1970s (historical)
- Significant components: school of arts
- Builders: Hanson & Sons

Cairns School of Arts is a heritage-listed former school of arts and now the Cairns Museum at 93–105 Lake Street, Cairns City, Cairns, Cairns Region, Queensland, Australia. It was designed by Tunbridge, Tunbridge & Lynch and built from 1907 to 1941 by Hanson & Sons. It was added to the Queensland Heritage Register on 21 October 1992.

The Cairns Museum is a local history museum operated by the Cairns Historical Society.

== History ==
This two-storeyed concrete building was erected in 1907 as new premises for the Cairns School of Arts, replacing an earlier adjacent building in Shields Street.

Schools of Arts were synonymous with Mechanics' Institutes, established in Britain early in the 19th century, and transplanted throughout the British Empire during the colonial era. The movement was instituted by George Birkbeck, who started giving free lectures in Edinburgh, Scotland, around 1799 and later formed the first Mechanics' Institute in London in 1823. The purpose of forming such an institute was to improve the education of working men, and to instruct them in various trades. By the late 19th century, Mechanics' Institutes had become popular agencies of adult education in general.

Mechanics' Institutes were part of a wider 19th century movement promoting popular education in Britain, at which time co-operative societies, working men's colleges and the university extension movement were established. The call for popular education in turn can be contextualised within the broader liberal, laissez-faire, non-interventionist philosophy which dominated British social, economic and political ideologies in the 19th century. In this environment, Mechanics' Institutes flourished as a means by which working men might improve their lot, either through self-education (the provision of reading rooms was an important facility provided by the Institutes), or by participating in instructional classes organised and funded by Institute members.

In some of the Australian colonies, Mechanics' Institutes were called Schools of Arts, and they were more likely to be run by the middle-classes. The provision of reading rooms, museums, lectures and classes were still important, but the Australian schools were also more likely to include a social programme in their calendar of events.

A School of Arts was established in Cairns in October 1885, by which time funds already were being raised for the erection of suitable meeting premises. The School's first building, a single-storeyed timber structure, was erected in 1886 in Shields Street to the west of the present building. Prior to its opening in May that year, the School of Arts Committee had established a reading room in rented premises.

During the second half of the 1880s the Cairns School of Arts flourished and a museum was established. The economic depression of the early 1890s, however, forced the School to close temporarily at the end of 1895, re-opening in 1897. In the early 1900s, Cairns Technical College classes were commenced at the School of Arts; these were taken over by the Department of Public Instruction in 1911.

By the early 1900s the School was in need of larger premises. On 8 December 1906, the Cairns School of Arts Bill was passed through the Queensland Parliament, empowering the Trustees to mortgage the School of Arts Reserve at Cairns to the value of £2500, for the purpose of erected a new building. A design competition was conducted for a new building, two-storeyed with upstairs accommodation for the School of Arts and the ground floor to be revenue-producing, the cost of which was not to exceed £2000. A design submitted by Arthur Beckford Polin was accepted, but rejected when tenders far exceeded the amount specified. The School of Arts Committee then commissioned Melbourne and North Queensland architects Tunbridge, Tunbridge and Lynch, who were Townsville-based but had a branch office in Cairns by 1907, to design a building to cost no more than the approved figure. Their work in Cairns around this time included the Harbour Board Offices (1907), the Central Hotel (1908), and the rebuilding of the Court House Hotel (1908). Hanson & Sons won the subsequent School of Arts contract with a price of £2170, and the new building was opened officially on 5 December 1907.

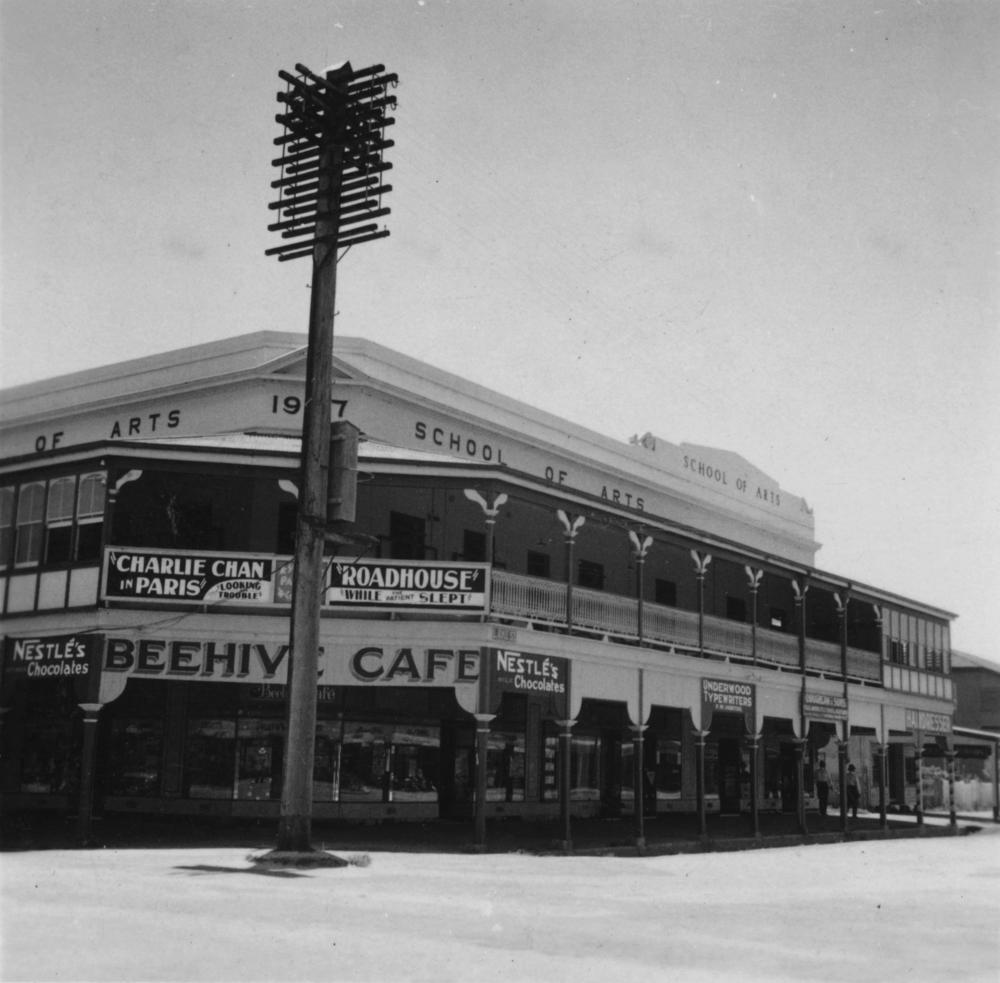
Cairns School of Arts, 1936

The building incorporated an early used of reinforced concrete in Queensland, although not employed through the whole of the structure. The concrete walls of the ground floor were reinforced with 0.5-inch (13 mm) round steel rods, fused where they intersected at 12-inch (300 mm) intervals. The floors at ground level were poured without reinforcement, and for the upper level walls, concrete was poured between timber formwork, without reinforcement.

The building has been subject to a number of alterations and extensions since 1907. A verandah and bathroom had been constructed upstairs at the rear by 1925, and in 1929 the Shields Street verandah was enclosed with windows. The enclosing of part of the Lake Street verandah probably dates to this period as well.

The first major extension was carried out in 1932. As early as 1925, the Committee was considering an extension of the building to accommodate more revenue-producing shops and offices. Plans were drawn by Committee member and architect SS Oxenham, but Cairns already had a glut of vacant shops for rent, and the concept was postponed until 1932, when the Committee commissioned Cairns architects Richard Hill & Arthur John Henry Taylor to prepare fresh plans, and the verandahed facade was extended along Lake Street at a cost of £2500. The extension provided more shop space at ground level and increased library accommodation upstairs. At this time, a decorative parapet was superimposed on the 1907 building to match that of the 1932 building.

The ground floor shop fronts were modernised in 1934–35, R Hill preparing the plans.

A second major extension to the building was carried out in 1939–40. Architects Hill & Taylor were again commissioned to extend the building along Lake Street to the boundary of the property. This time, the architects felt that an extension of the verandah was unnecessary and suggested that a cantilever awning would be suitable and that the elevation be treated as a separate unit. Cairns builder Albert Andrew Ferrari constructed the Art Deco styled extensions at a cost of approximately £4,000. At the same time a terrazzo slab bearing the name School of Arts was placed in the concrete of the footpath at the corner of Lake and Shields Streets.

Hill & Taylor designed new male and female bathrooms in 1941 in what is believed to have been an enclosed first floor verandah. The original bathroom, beside the meeting room, was probably converted to a kitchen at that time.

The ground floor of the Shields Street facade was extended c. 1956, to connect the School of Arts to the Penny Savings Bank. Both the bank and the 1950s extensions have been demolished.

For seventy years, the first floor of the School of Arts building housed the only public library in Cairns, a subscription library with up to 1,000 members. It was run by the School of Arts Committee, and financed from the rents obtained from the shops and offices on the ground floor. By the mid-1970s, the library was the sole function of the School of Arts, which was struggling to provide an appropriate library service to a city the size of Cairns. On 30 June 1977 the School of Arts building and its library was transferred to the Cairns City Council, which moved the library into a new structure in Lake Street in 1979.

In 1980 the Cairns Historical Society opened a museum in the vacated first floor premises, and c. 1983 the whole building was renovated. At this time the cast-iron balustrade was removed and replaced with cast aluminium, and the earlier bathrooms were removed. The ground floor retains shops and offices.

In March 2016, the building closed for an $8.69M refurbishment with the historical society and museum temporarily relocated until the refurbishment is complete (scheduled early 2017).

== Description ==
The former Cairns School of Arts, located on the south-western corner of Lake and Shields streets, is a two-storeyed building with verandahs to both street frontages and a corrugated iron roof concealed behind a parapet wall. The building is of concrete, with only the ground floor being reinforced.

The building was built in 3 stages, with the first being the corner section. The third stage of construction, the northern end on Lake Street, was designed as a separate unit. This is still evident in the treatment of the parapet, although the verandah was extended along this elevation in the 1983 renovation works replacing a cantilevered awning.

The verandahs have corrugated iron skillion awnings and timber posts and brackets, with a timber valance to the ground floor and cast metal balustrade to the first floor. The northern and western sections of the first floor verandah have been glazed.

The first stage has the words SCHOOL OF ARTS to both street frontages, with the date 1907 at the corner. The second stage has a raised gabled parapet which also has the building's name, but in different lettering. The third stage's original facade and lettering has been altered. A terrazzo slab with the words SCHOOL OF ARTS is laid in the footpath at the corner of the building.

Internally, the ground floor contains retail outlets and has been extensively altered with an arcade from the Lake Street frontage through to the rear of the building. The street facade has ceramic tiling, and some early shopfront elements including timber framing and leadlight panels. The first floor contains museum and display space, with suspended ceilings and air conditioning throughout, and French doors with fanlights opening onto the verandah. It is entered from Shields Street via a stair with a turned timber balustrade, and most internal walls have been removed.

The 1983 renovation works include a concrete verandah, with steel posts and balustrade, constructed at the rear linking a 2-storeyed toilet and storage building. The rear of the site contains car parking and service areas.

== Heritage listing ==
The former Cairns School of Arts was listed on the Queensland Heritage Register on 21 October 1992 having satisfied the following criteria.

The place is important in demonstrating the evolution or pattern of Queensland's history.

The School of Arts is important in demonstrating the pattern and evolution of Queensland's history, being an important component of the cultural life of the Cairns community from the beginning of the 19th century, as a school of arts, public library, and museum. It is important also as an early use of reinforced concrete in Queensland.

The place is important because of its aesthetic significance.

The place is important in demonstrating a range of aesthetic characteristics valued by the Cairns community, in particular the contribution of the building through scale, form and material, to the streetscapes of Lake and Shields streets and to the Cairns townscape.

The place has a special association with the life or work of a particular person, group or organisation of importance in Queensland's history.

The place has a special association with the Cairns School of Arts and its contribution to adult education in Cairns for nearly 70 years, and with influential Melbourne and North Queensland architectural firm Tunbridge, Tunbridge & Lynch, as evidence of their commercial work.
