= Adelaide Steamship Co Ltd Building, Cairns =

Adelaide Steamship Company Ltd Building
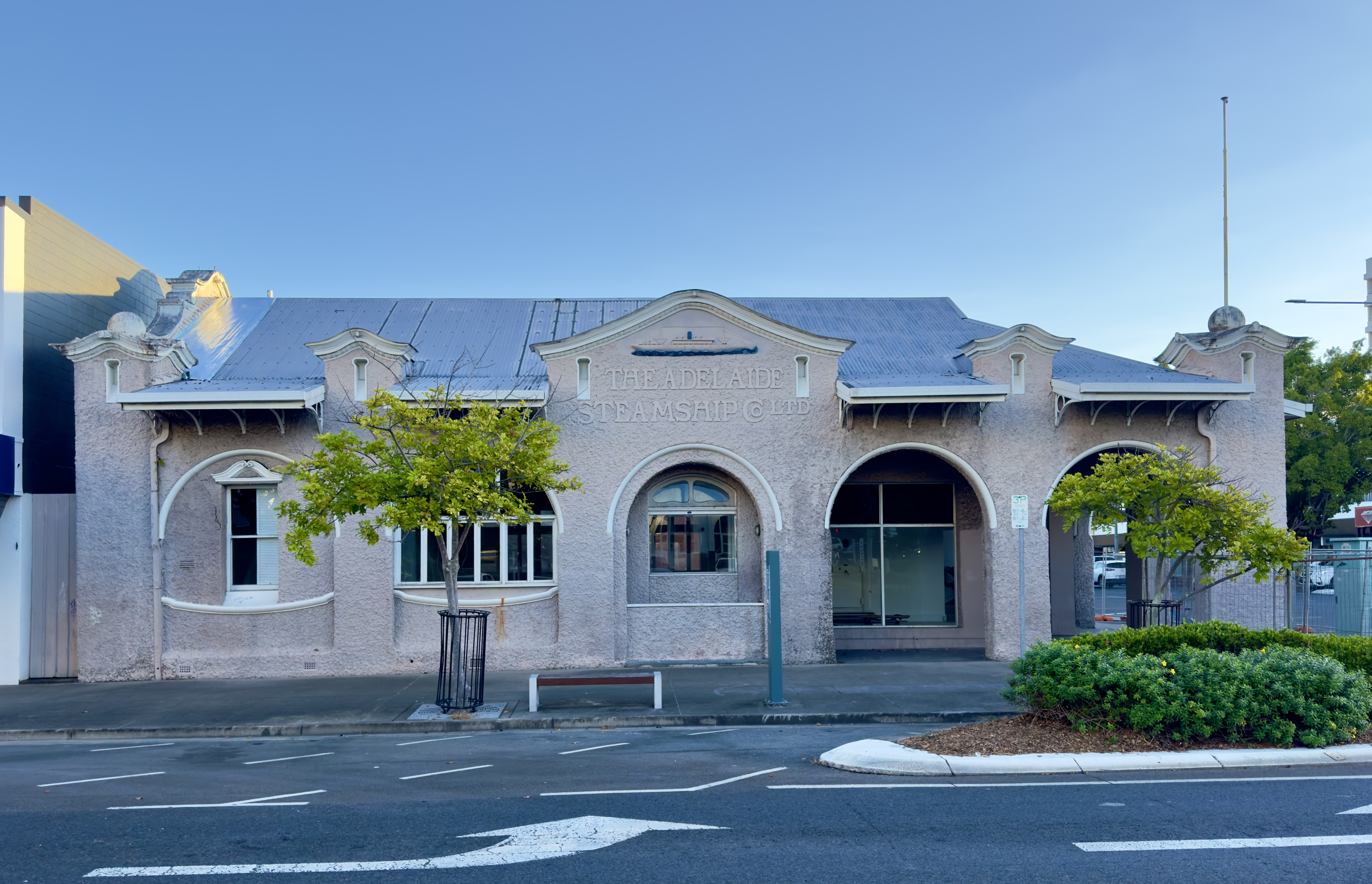
- Adelaide Steamship Co Ltd Building, 2025

- Location within Queensland Location within Australia
- 16.9242°S 145.7772°E
- Location: 37 Lake Street, Cairns City, Cairns, Cairns Region, Queensland, Australia

History
- Design period: 1900–1914 (early 20th century)
- Built: 1910

Site notes
- Architectural style: Arts & Crafts

Queensland Heritage Register
- Official name: Adelaide Steamship Co Ltd (former), Adelaide Steamship Company Ltd Building
- Type: state heritage (built)
- Designated: 9 July 1993
- Reference no.: 600381
- Significant period: 1910 (fabric); 1910–1964 (historical use)
- Significant components: wall/s, gate – entrance
- Builders: Wilson & Baillie

Adelaide Steamship Company Ltd Building is a heritage-listed office building at 37 Lake Street, Cairns City, Cairns, Cairns Region, Queensland, Australia. It was built in 1910 by Wilson & Baillie. It was added to the Queensland Heritage Register on 9 July 1993.

== History ==
This single-storeyed masonry building was erected in 1910 for the Adelaide Steamship Company Limited, as their new Cairns offices.

The Adelaide Steamship Company Ltd, established in Adelaide in 1875, entered the Queensland coastal trade in 1893 with a weekly service to Brisbane. By 1895 it had established an agency in Cairns, which was emerging as a major port servicing Far North Queensland's developing mineral, pastoral and sugar industries. About 1905, the company established a branch in Cairns, possibly in rented premises. The present site was acquired in 1907 by James Harvey, chairman of the Adelaide Steamship Co Ltd from 1888 to 1915. In 1909, Cairns architect Harvey George Lloyd Draper handled the tendering process for the company's new offices in Cairns, but it is not clear whether he carried out the design. The building was designed in the newly developed Arts and Crafts manner, established in Europe and adapted to the Cairns tropical climate. The building was erected during 1910 by Cairns contractors Wilson & Baillie, at a cost of £2,970, and was opened on 12 December 1910. Its location, at the corner of Lake and Spence Streets, boosted commercial development along Spence Street.

The new offices were constructed towards the end of a buoyant economic period when the principal Australian shipping companies - the Adelaide Steamship Company Ltd, the Australian United Steam Navigation Co. Ltd (Burns, Philp & Company Ltd) and the Howard Smith Company Ltd - vied for the lucrative Queensland coastal trade in passengers and cargo. Their construction reflected the Adelaide Steamship Company Ltd's growing importance to the economic prosperity of North Queensland, in particular the Cairns region, through its involvement in the sugar, coal and passenger trade.

The Adelaide Steamship Co. Ltd sold the building in 1964. In 1976 it was purchased by the present owners. Some of the concrete balustrading on the verandahs, and an office on the street corner of the building have been removed, and some timber windows have been removed or relocated.

== Description ==
The former Adelaide Steam Ship building is a single-storeyed rough-rendered masonry structure, located on the corner of Lake and Spence Street at the southwestern edge of the Cairns Central business district. It reflects a strong Arts and Crafts influence in its design and detailing.

The building has a corrugated iron roof with shaped end gables and sprocketted eaves, which are supported by curved metal brackets and pierced by tapering piers with shallow ogee shaped gablets above. The corner and end piers are surmounted by spheres.

The building has arcaded verandahs to both street frontages, consisting of five bays to Lake Street and three to Spence Street, with large rounded fabric awnings attached. There is a shallow ogee shaped central gable to Lake Street, which originally surmounted the entry but now houses a recessed window, with the words THE ADELAIDE STEAMSHIP CO LTD in relief and a sculpture of one of their vessels above. Sections of concave solid balustrade have been removed to provide access to a relocated corner entry, and end bays have timber framed casement windows.

The Spence Street facade culminates with a wall return housing a keyhole shape gateway with scroll detail above, and a service drive with gates beside. A toilet block and carport are located at the rear. Internally, the building has been refurbished.

== Heritage listing ==
The Adelaide Steamship Co Ltd Building was listed on the Queensland Heritage Register on 9 July 1993 having satisfied the following criteria.

The place is important in demonstrating the evolution or pattern of Queensland's history.

The former Adelaide Steamship Company Ltd Building is important in contributing to our understanding of the evolution of Cairns as the major port of Far North Queensland in the early 20th century.

The place demonstrates rare, uncommon or endangered aspects of Queensland's cultural heritage.

The place is important in demonstrating the principal characteristics of a particular class of cultural places.

It is significant as a rare example of an Arts and Crafts building in Cairns, which has been particularly designed to accommodate the tropical climate.

The place is important because of its aesthetic significance.

The place exhibits a range of aesthetic characteristics valued by the Cairns community, in particular: the scale, form, materials and composition of architectural elements, designed in the newly developed Arts and Craft manner established in Europe and appropriately adapted to the Cairns tropical climate; and the contribution to the streetscapes of Lake and Spence streets and to the Cairns townscape.

The place has a special association with the life or work of a particular person, group or organisation of importance in Queensland's history.

The place has a special association with the Adelaide Steamship Company Ltd, which made a major contribution to the economic development of Far North Queensland in the late 19th and early 20th centuries.
