= Bolands Centre =

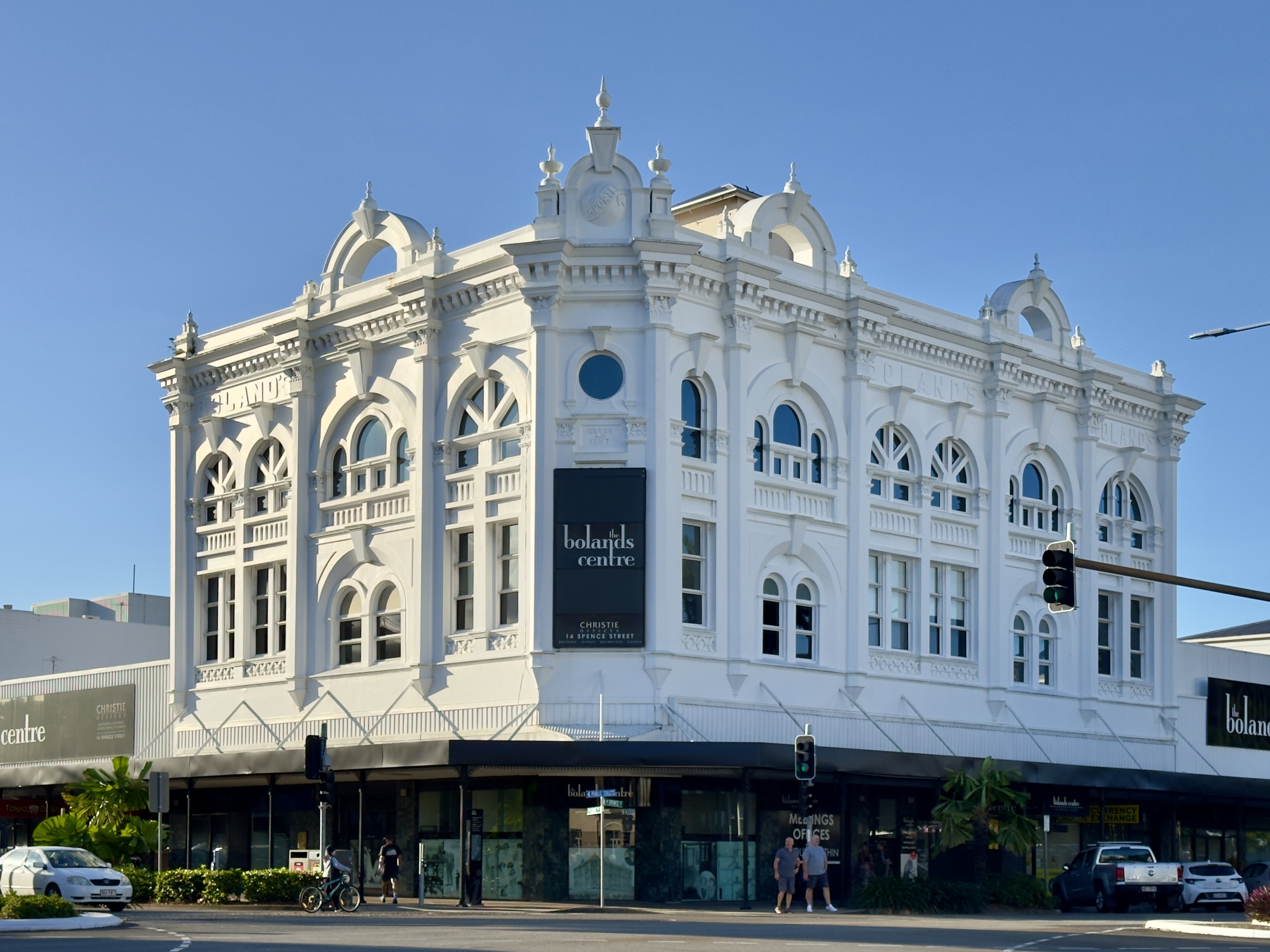
- Bolands Centre

- Location within Queensland Location within Australia
- 16.9233°S 145.7774°E
- Location: Lake Street, Cairns City, Cairns, Cairns Region, Queensland, Australia

History
- Design period: 1900–1914 (early 20th century)
- Built: 1912–1937

Site notes
- Architect: Edward Gregory Waters

Queensland Heritage Register
- Official name: Bolands Centre, Boland's Building, Boland's Departmental Store
- Type: state heritage (built)
- Designated: 7 April 2006
- Reference no.: 602536
- Significant period: 1910s, 1930s (fabric); 1913–1984 (historical use as a department store)
- Significant components: elevator, strong room

Bolands Centre is a heritage-listed department store at Lake Street, Cairns, Queensland, Australia. Designed by Edward Gregory Waters and built in 1912, the Centre was home to a David Jones department store and a prominent toy shop. It is also known as Boland's Building and Boland's Departmental Store. It was added to the Queensland Heritage Register on 7 April 2006.

== History ==
The Bolands Centre, a large reinforced concrete former department store, was erected in 1912–1913 for Michael Boland, an Irish immigrant who migrated to Australia in 1881 and became a leading merchant in Cairns. The building was designed by the Cairns architect Edward Gregory Waters, and for many years was the tallest structure in the city. It is the last surviving example of a large, early 20th century department store in Cairns.

Michael Boland was born in 1863 in Ireland. He came from an impoverished rural background but at the age of fifteen moved to Dublin to study business for a year. Around 1879 he emigrated to Australia, initially lodging in Melbourne, then moving briefly to Queanbeyan, New South Wales, where he gained practical experience as a grocer in his uncle's store. He then travelled north, arriving in Cairns in 1882, where he bought a small allotment in Lily Street. Between 1882 and 1887 he became involved in a number of economic ventures within the Cairns district. These included a contract to clear Spence and Bunda Streets in Cairns in 1886, and in 1888 establishing the Camp Oven Creek Hotel at Barron Gorge during the building of the Cairns-to-Herberton railway line. He also held a selection on the Russell River, north of Innisfail, and was reputed to have spent time tin-mining at Bloomfield and working on the construction of the Cape York telegraph line. From these ventures he accumulated sufficient capital to return to Cairns by 1890 and establish a modest grocery shop in leased wooden premises in Abbott Street, which was the initial commercial centre of Cairns.

In 1893 Michael Boland, like many people at the time, struggled to keep his business viable in the face of a world recession and the temporary closure of the National Bank of Queensland. Conditions were made more difficult in Cairns by the onset of the so-called "store wars", an intense competitive struggle between five key merchant firms: Michael Boland, Burns Philp & Co., G.R. Mayers & Co. and two newly opened co-operatives, the Co-operative Cash Stores and the Cairns Co-operative Store Co.

Michael Boland's business survived these difficulties and in 1898 shifted to a 40 perches (1,000 m^{2}) allotment in Section 4, at the northeast corner of Lake and Spence Streets. As the Cairns grew, businesses moved from Abbott Street to adjoining streets, and in particular to Section 4, which was later referred to as "The Golden Block" due to its high concentration of prominent firms. Boland was among the first merchants to make this transition. In Spence Street, on the eastern portion of this land, Michael Boland built a single-storied timber shop which he ran as a general store. Boland also constructed three smaller, adjoining shops that he leased out to various small businesses. The western section of the allotment, which fronted Lake and Spence Streets, consisted of a sand ridge and low-lying swamp, and remained vacant.

By 1901 Boland had acquired an adjoining property fronting Lake Street, which contained three shops. Further down Lake Street, Michael Boland's brother, John, established a co-operative grocery and general store.

From these small beginnings Michael Boland gradually emerged as a pioneer of commerce in Cairns and built up an extensive business empire, which included investments in mining and the Cumming Brothers Butchery. His firm was among the biggest importers and retailers in Far North Queensland, dealing with an extensive range of goods, many sourced directly from overseas manufacturers.

The contribution of the firm to the prosperity of Cairns and its district was considerable. Until the link to the state railway system was made in the early 1920s, Cairns remained a relatively isolated community accessed primarily by sea, and the Boland firm was instrumental in satisfying many of its material needs. It was also a major employer while its lines of credit allowed many early sugar growers to survive the hard years of this industry's infancy.

Michael Boland was among the most prominent citizens of Cairns. He was elected to the Cairns Municipal Council in 1896 and was briefly appointed a director of the local Penny Savings Bank in 1899. He was a high-profile supporter of worker's rights, the Labour Party and early unionism, and also had some association with the local Chinese community, in 1904 giving money to help effect repairs to one of the temples and acting as the receiver for the firm of Sun Shun Lee during its liquidation.

Among Michael Boland's most significant roles was his association with the Cairns Harbour Board. In 1899 Boland, with his friend and fellow merchant, Callaghan Walsh, began publicly agitating for the formation of a Harbour Board. They saw this as essential for the growth of trade in Cairns, but faced strong opposition, in particular from one of Boland's fiercest commercial rivals, A.J. Draper, who argued that such a move was premature for the community resources at the time. Following heated public debate, Boland and his faction were successful in establishing the Provisional Harbour Board in 1899, but it took six years of further lobbying before the Cairns Harbour Board was constituted on 20 December 1905. It had its first meeting on 28 February 1906. The Board consisted of 9 members, two representing the Town of Cairns, and 7 representing outlying regions. Both Boland and Walsh were elected as the members for Cairns, and in 1909 Boland was elected chairman. Over the ensuing years the Harbour Board played a critical role in developing Cairns into a major port in North Queensland by improving wharf facilities and implementing the dredging of the harbour to allow deepwater berthing.

In 1902 Boland's business had grown sufficiently to warrant major improvements to his existing premises and construction of a spacious single-storied concrete shop fronting Spence Street, the first large concrete building erected in Cairns. The construction of this store necessitated the partial demolition of the original wooden shop. The new building carried an ornate facade with pediment and parapet, and a bullnose verandah. The verandah had paired columns with decorative brackets, and a frieze of rectangular fretwork. When completed the upgrade permitted Boland to begin the process of transforming his business from a simple general store into a large emporium with separate grocery, haberdashery and hardware departments. Department stores represented a new approach to retailing and were becoming prominent in all of Queensland's main centres and represented a new approach to retailing. The traditional retail business that had dominated Queensland's 19th century retail landscape was centred on a relatively narrow range of products and activities, and in its design and layout gave little consideration to consumer psychology. The department store, however, offered an extensive range of goods and services and created for the consumer an encompassing retail environment that was enjoyable and encouraged shopping.

By 1909 Michael Boland's department store had proved successful and he expanded his business into his adjacent three Lake Street stores, displacing the earlier tenants. Then in 1911 he commissioned Cairns architect Edward Gregory Waters to draw up plans for a new building to be built on the site of the swamp at the vacant corner of Lake and Spence Streets. Waters, who had previously worked in Rockhampton, Mount Morgan and Gympie, was active in Cairns from 1909 until 1917. While in Cairns he worked as the Cairns Harbour Board Engineer. He was a specialist in ferro-concrete construction and was responsible for a number of prominent buildings in Cairns, including the Central Hotel and St. Josephs Convent.

The plans for Michael Boland's new building were approved by the Cairns Town Engineer in May 1912 and JT Bullock was awarded the contract for the construction. Reflecting Boland's increasing wealth and social status, the building was to be an impressive structure of reinforced concrete, the first three-storeyed building in Cairns. Although Boland had pioneered all-concrete construction methods in his 1902 building, in 1912 Cairns was still a town of timber, brick and corrugated iron and the use of concrete for the new building was still a comparatively early use of reinforced concrete in Queensland. Due to its strength and insulating qualities, concrete construction proved highly suitable to the tropical climate and cyclonic conditions experienced in North Queensland and in later decades dominated its building industry.

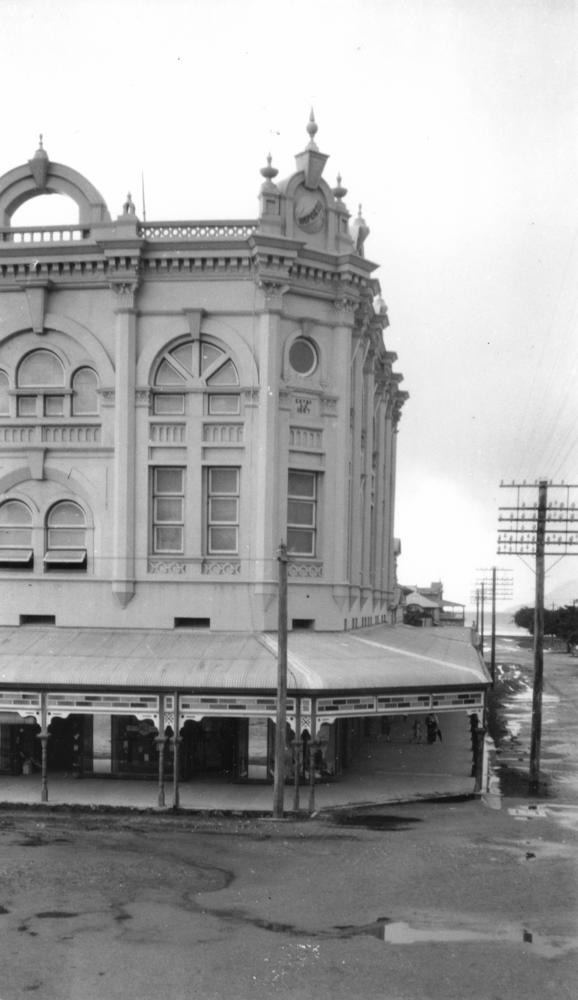
Bolands situated on the corner of Lake and Spence Streets, Cairns, 1925

The construction work, carried out during 1912 and 1913, was a major undertaking that elicited interest from the local press. The swamp at the site was drained and filled but due to the unstable nature of the ground the building sat on a floating foundation laid with girders rather than traditional piles. The walls, floors, internal columns and decorative details of the facade were cast in moulds. The Portland cement used for the building was imported in casks from England and poured using an innovative concrete roller mixer with an independent hoist system. An English firm, Dorman, Long and Co., who later supplied steel for the Sydney Harbour Bridge, prefabricated the steel work for the building.

The building was rectangular in plan, and when completed measured 27.6 by 19.8 metres (91 by 65 ft), with the long axis oriented along Spence Street. The remaining section of the early wooden store had been demolished and the new building was connected internally to the 1902 store. It also had entrances on both Spence and Lake streets. The bullnose corrugated iron awning of the 1902 emporium was extended along both street frontages of the new building and repeated the earlier paired columns, pierced frieze and other decorative elements.

At ground level the Lake and Spence Street facade carried large, rectangular shop windows of clear plate-glass imported from England. On the first and second floor levels the facade was executed in an imposing, ornate style, based predominantly on Classical and Romanesque elements. On the upper storeys the fenestration consisted of a combination of fixed and top-hung sash windows, with a single round window incorporated into the facade at the Lake and Spence Street corner at the second floor level. Immediately above the awning there was also a series of narrow, rectangular, bottom-hinged windows. Early photographs suggest the upper storey windows were filled with opaque glass.

The rear (north and east) walls of the building were unornamented and pierced by rectangular, double-hung, four-pane sash windows. Early photographs indicate that the building was painted in light, neutral colours with the name 'Boland's' picked out in darker colour under the parapet and on the east wall. The north wall carried the line "Boland's Departmental Store".

The roof of the building was flat and of poured concrete construction, and as such was the first known example of this type of roof in Cairns, and among the earliest in Queensland. It was waterproofed by a layer of bitumen and drained by five openings on the parapet on the north side, which connected to two down-pipes. This space was accessible to the public and was referred to as the "plateau" in Waters' design proposal, and as the "roof garden" by staff members. During World War I musicians used it as a stage for patriotic performances. Along the Spence and Lake Street sides the roof was protected by an ornamented parapet incorporating finials, arches, and balustrades of interlocked concrete circles.

The building was installed with an electric passenger elevator, the first to be included in any building in Cairns, and among the earliest examples of this technology in North Queensland. The motor and control unit were housed on the roof in a centrally located square tower with a lower wing projecting from the west side. Waters' design called for a two-tier, ogee-style roof but it is unclear whether this was ever built, and from at least the 1920s the elevator tower had a shallow, hipped roof.

The interior of the building was open plan, with the floors and roof being supported by iron girders and large internal columns of reinforced concrete. The floors, like the roof, were of concrete slab construction, and also early examples of their type in Queensland. A well hole passing through the centre of the first and second floors helped conduct air and light through the building. The upper floors were accessed by wooden stairs as well as the electric lift. The building was completed in time for the 1913 Christmas trade, with the shop windows carrying brilliant displays of electroplated Birmingham silverware. The new building marked the development of Michael Boland's business into one of the first modern department stores in North Queensland. It allowed the further organisation and growth of separate departments providing customers with an extensive choice of goods and services. The firm was able to cater not only to the local trade but also to visitors from all over the vast hinterland for which Cairns was the centre.

The building also gained recognition as a city icon, and the intersection of Lake and Spence Street became known as Boland's Corner. Physically, through its height, mass and striking style, the building dominated the streetscape.

The ongoing success of firm was marked in 1915 when the Articles of Association of Bolands Limited were filed at the office of the Register of Joint Stock Companies and a branch store in Babinda was opened. In 1923, however, the firm suffered the loss of Michael Boland, who died of a heart condition in 1923. Control of the department store passed to his three sons: Thomas, William and James. Thomas assumed the position of head manager while the other brothers acted as departmental managers. Under their direction the firm continued to grow and by Cairns' jubilee in 1926 the store at Spence and Lake Streets boasted 15 departments and buying offices in London, New York, Kobe and all the Australian states.

During this period Thomas Boland initiated a number of cosmetic and functional alterations to the store, among the first being painting out the "Departmental Store" sign on the northern face, and installing a freight lift shaft, which could be seen as an extra tower on the northeast corner of the building's roof. In 1929 extensive remodelling of the interior was undertaken. The architect responsible was E.H. Boden, and G.A. Stronach was the builder. New shop fronts incorporating polished stone veneer and large square shop windows were also installed by Burns, Johnsson and Humphreys. The total cost of the renovations was estimated at £19,000. Other changes included the installation of electricity at the end of the 1920s, and during the 1930s the awning frieze was changed from fretwork to a solid panel carrying the Boland name, and the balustrade on the parapet was converted into a solid wall.

Another important change occurred in 1936/37 when, as part of the firm's 75th anniversary celebrations, the store was extended to the east onto part of an adjacent allotment. This new two-storey wing, designed by VM Brown and constructed by WC Kyanastan, was also constructed in reinforced concrete. It was 19.8 metres (65 ft) wide and 19.5 metres (64 ft) deep. It possessed a concrete first floor with a large central well hole, large plate-glass windows and a roof of wood and iron. The facade incorporated lineal motifs, large rosettes and starburst medallions, and three glass doors opening onto small concrete balconies with ornamental iron railings. Along the street frontage there was a cantilevered awning.

During World War II the Bolands firm felt the effects of disrupted shipping and the rationing of goods. During this period the first floor of the east wing of the store was occupied by the American Navy.

In the post-war period the firm experienced a resurgence trade and prosperity. During the 1950s new furniture and toy departments and a mezzanine floor were installed in the three-story building. Sometime after 1950 the original awning was replaced by a flat, cantilevered awning. In 1962 the 1902 store was demolished and replaced by a new building and the frontages and fittings of the other buildings were updated. By this date Bolands Ltd was the largest department store in Cairns, employing 100 staff.

At various times the store was damaged by natural elements. Until the Cairns City Council put in new drainage, the Lake and Spence Street corner was subject to flooding in the wet season, and in the 1930s and 1955 the ground floor was inundated. In 1924 three large windows on the Spence Street side of the main store building were mysteriously smashed, reputedly by lightning, and in 1951 a fire broke out on the top floor, damaging the ceiling and wooden partitions. As it aged, the roof also began to leak badly, and was eventually covered with Colorbond sheeting.

Thomas Boland retired in 1963 and the directors of the firm sold their shareholding to David Jones. David Jones appointed Thomas's son, Terry, as manager of the store. In 1967 David Jones installed a cafeteria, milk bar and small goods section on the ground floor and the largest chilled water air-conditioning plant in North Queensland. David Jones gradually replaced the Bolands logo in the newspaper advertising but never removed the Boland name from the building. Title to the Spence/Lake Street corner block was transferred to David Jones in 1979 but the firm's occupation of the site ceased in 1984 when it relocated to new premises at Earlville. During the 1970s and early 1980s the Bolands Building had steadily become redundant as the Cairns central business district, along with other Australian centres, suffered the effects of a nationwide drift of retailing activity to the suburbs. Soon after the departure of David Jones the building was acquired by the Kern Brothers Corporation, which significantly remodelled it at a cost of $2,000,000. Aware of the building's iconic status, the new owners retained the first and second floor facades, and the open-plan interior of the second floor. The lower levels were converted into individual shops on the ground floor and offices on the first floor. Other internal changes included the installation of false ceilings, the removal of the old internal staircases, and the closure of the passenger elevator. Externally, the ground street shop frontages were remodelled in an imitation Victorian period style. New windows and facades carried arched decorative panels, and the awning was fitted with non-structural, reproduction Classical columns and cast-metal friezes. A third entrance was created at the Lake and Spence Street corner. The entire building was repainted externally with a special paint selected to minimise future deterioration.

The building re-opened as the Bolands Centre in May 1985 with considerable fanfare. The redevelopment was lauded as a landmark example of adaptive re-use of an historic building and emerged as a key event that stimulated the revival of the Cairns central business district during the late 1980s and 1990s. In 1987 the Prettejohn family bought the building and since 1991 it has been managed by Pearce Coleman & Associates. The last major changes to its fabric occurred in 1999 when the north and east faces of the three-storied building were clad in COLORBOND which blocked all window openings on these elevations. Around this time the ground floor shop fronts were once again remodelled.

== Description ==
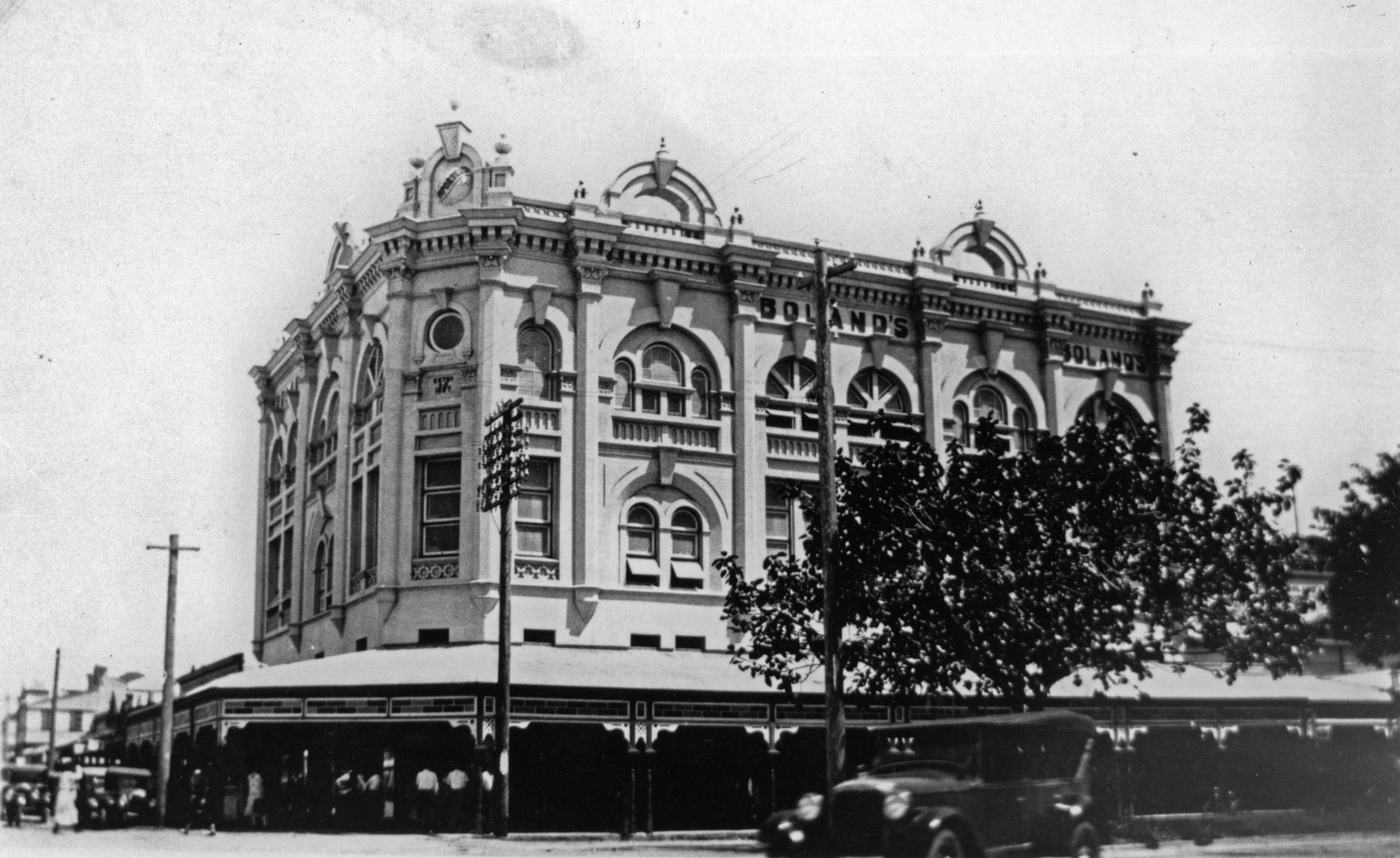
Boland Building in Cairns

The Bolands Centre comprises a three-storey concrete building (Building A), erected in 1912/1913 on the corner of Lake and Spence Streets, and a 1960s single storey building (Building B) of brick and COLORBOND sheeting on Spence Street. The latter is not considered to be of cultural heritage significance. Historically the centre has been associated with a number of other buildings on adjoining allotments that together formed an extensive department store established by the Cairns merchant, Michael Boland.

=== Building A ===
Above the street level the exterior of Building A is executed in a grandiose, ornate style employing an eclectic mix of Classical and Romanesque design elements. The facade is asymmetrical, with the top two stories tied together by a blind arcade incorporating Romanesque arches with exaggerated keystones and pilasters surmounted by composite capitals. The facade also incorporates horizontally arranged panels of relief-moulded interlocked circles at the juncture of the ground and first floor, similar panels of relief-moulded arches at the juncture of the first and second floor, and the Boland's name in prominent relief lettering beneath the parapet. The facade is painted in cream with some details picked out in dark green. The rear of the building is clad in yellow COLORBOND sheeting.

On the first floor facade the fenestration consists of pairs of arched windows, contained within arched recesses, alternating with rectangular windows arranged singly or in groups of two or four. Transoms divide these windows horizontally into three sections. The majority are filled with modern clear glass or glass louvers, but in the semi-circular transom lights of the arched windows early, opaque, textured glass is retained. The Lake and Spence Street corner of the building is pierced by a single rectangular window which is blocked out with a panel that supports an illuminated sign reading: "Bolands Centre".

On the second floor level the fenestration is dominated by triple arched windows and large, arched windows divided by three thick, radiating concrete mullions. A large, round window also perforates the facade at the Lake and Spence Street corner. All the windows at this level are filled with modern, clear glass set in aluminium frames.

The street level shop fronts have green marble facing and modern, rectangular glass shop windows. The awning is a flat-roofed cantilevered type supported above by tubular metal braces fixed to the facade, and incorporating non-structural; singly arranged, fluted, iron columns ornamented with Corinthian capitals and cast-iron fringe. The footpath is of concrete and clay brick pavers.

The building's roof is flat and sheeted with modern Colorbond iron. It is surrounded on the south and west sides by an ornamented parapet incorporating finials and arches, and on the north and east sides by a plain parapet. Below the ornamented parapet runs an eave supported by closely spaced corbels. Projecting from the roof is a centrally located elevator house comprising a square-based tower and projecting wing, and a tower for the freight elevator shaft on the northeast corner.

Internally the building consists of series of shops of various sizes on the ground floor and business offices on the first floor. The main entrance foyer on Spence Street still retains early black and white floor tiling and has some white-painted wood arching, elaborate plaster cornices and ceiling mouldings. Above the suspended ceiling of the first floor there are still substantial remains of the original ceiling, including decorative, pressed metal panels and scrolled concrete capitals associated with some of the internal columns.

The second floor, which cannot be accessed by the public, retains its original open plan. The ceiling consists of permanent formwork of curved corrugated iron sheets resting on exposed iron beams. These are supported by thick, plain, squared columns. The floor is concrete and shows traces of previous rubberised coverings and red paint. A walk-in Chubb safe room with an external wooden bench stand against the eastern wall. The centre of the floor is pieced by a square well hole surrounded by an intact silkyoak balustrade constructed in an angular style with pinnacled newell-posts. The view through the well hole to the ground floor is now blocked by the suspended ceiling of the first floor. The original staircase connecting the second and the first floor has been replaced by a metal ladder. The staircase was originally attached to the northern wall, near the goods lift shaft. A partial outline of the staircase in the paintwork on the wall indicates it was constructed in a style matching the balustrade of the well hole.

The paintwork on the internal walls of the second floor, which is peeling extensively, shows a range of colour layers, including light yellow, light blue and white. The windows in the rear walls have silkyoak architraves and most are double-hung, four-pane sashes glazed with opaque hexagonal wired glass. A number of these windows have had the lower sash permanently raised, with the opening filled with metal- framed glass louvers, while a small number have had their panes entirely replaced by glass louvers.

The electric passenger elevator car and associated shaft and machinery remain in situ. The elevator car is constructed of dark-stained English oak. On the second floor and in the elevator house there is a lift shaft enclosure with panelling, doors and decorative frieze of dark-stained English oak. The elevator house is accessed by a wooden staircase that runs up the side of the second floor lift well enclosure. The intact motor and control unit are intact and sit within the roof space of the elevator house, which is accessed by an iron ladder leading to a hatchway. The windows within the electric elevator house are double-hung and glazed with hexagonal wired glass. The bottom sashes are single paned, while the top sashes are triple paned.

The freight lift shaft is still visible on the second floor but the mechanism has been removed. There are, however, the remains of the attachment system evident in the roof space.

=== Building B ===
The adjoining Building B is a single storey Besser-brick and iron structure. At street level it shares the same awning, green marble facing and window style as Building A. Above the awning the facade is covered in cream-painted COLORBOND iron. Internally the building is subdivided into modern retail outlets. Due to its late construction and extensive internal modifications it is of relatively low cultural heritage value.

== Heritage listing ==
Bolands Centre was listed on the Queensland Heritage Register on 7 April 2006 having satisfied the following criteria.

The place is important in demonstrating the evolution or pattern of Queensland's history.

The Bolands Centre, constructed in 1912/13, is significant as it demonstrates the growth of Cairns as a centre of commerce in Queensland, and the evolution of Queensland's retail industry. The building was erected to house a large department store during the early twentieth century, a period of strong economic growth in Cairns, and a time when department stores, offering a wide range of goods and services, were being established in Queensland. During the 1980s the Bolands Centre was remodelled and led the rejuvenation of the Cairns central business district following a national drift of retail business from town centres to the suburbs. The place is significant because of the inclusion of a number of innovative ideas. In its scale and striking design the building represented a creative achievement for Cairns at the time. The construction process was a major undertaking and required some technical innovation. The building was one of the earliest large commercial structures in Far North Queensland to be entirely constructed of concrete, a practice that would later become common due to the capacity of concrete to cope with the tropical climate and cyclones. The structure was also the first large building in Cairns, and among the earliest in Far North Queensland, to incorporate an electric passenger elevator. When it was completed the Bolands Centre was to be among the first modern department stores in Far North Queensland. In later years it continued to incorporate new technologies and ideas.

The place demonstrates rare, uncommon or endangered aspects of Queensland's cultural heritage.

The Bolands Centre is a rare surviving Far North Queensland example of a large, pre-World War I department store. Department stores were established in Brisbane and the main provincial centres of Queensland, including Cairns, but the Bolands Centre is the only extant example in Far North Queensland. Although remodelled on its lower floors, its facade remains intact, elements of the original ceilings survive, and the top floor, with associated elevator machinery, has remained undeveloped.

The place is important in demonstrating the principal characteristics of a particular class of cultural places.

The Bolands Centre is important in demonstrating the principle characteristics of large department stores of the pre-World War I period. Its size and ornate detailing reflect the social aspirations and entrepreneurial strategies of the business elite who built such stores, while the surviving internal elements, particularly the undeveloped top floor and elevator, demonstrate the layout, design principles and technology employed. The Bolands Centre is also associated with work of Edward Gregory Waters, a prominent Cairns architect who designed the building and was responsible for a number of important structures within the city.

The place is important because of its aesthetic significance.

The building has aesthetic value due to the height, scale and the detailing of the facade, which is largely intact. The facade is of cast concrete executed in an ornate style, based an eclectic mix of Classical and other design elements, which projects an imposing, elegant presence on the streetscape.

The place has a strong or special association with a particular community or cultural group for social, cultural or spiritual reasons.

The place has social significance as an iconic landmark due to its size, aesthetic appeal and longevity within the streetscape of Cairns, and the role it has played in the business life of Far North Queensland.

The place has a special association with the life or work of a particular person, group or organisation of importance in Queensland's history.

The Bolands Centre has direct associations with Michael Boland and his family, who built it and managed it for many years. Michael Boland was an early and important entrepreneur who established a large, long-lived commercial empire in Cairns and became one of the community's leading citizens.
