= Barron Gorge =

Barron Gorge refers to the gorge created by the Barron River in the Cairns Region, Queensland, Australia.

The following articles relate to Barron Gorge:

- Barron Gorge, Queensland, the locality in which the gorge is located
- Barron Gorge National Park, a protected area centred on the gorge
- Barron Gorge Hydroelectric Power Station, a power station in the gorge
