= Surprise Creek Falls =

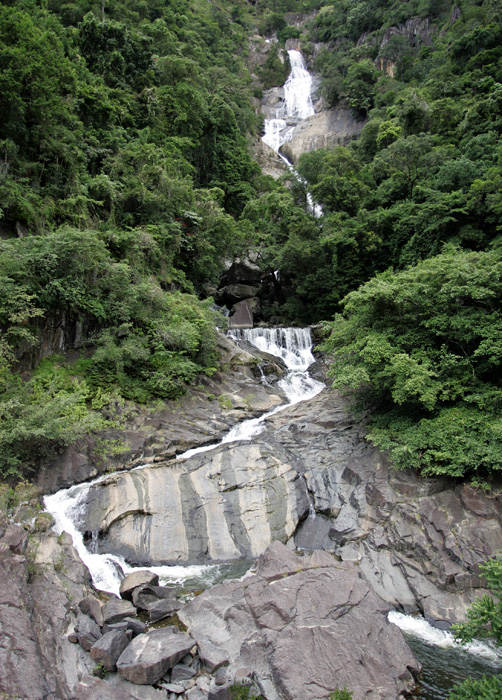
- Surprise Creek Falls, in 2008

- Location within Queensland
- Location: Far North Queensland, Australia
- Coordinates: 18°10′25″S 145°36′10″E
- Type: Segmented
- Total height: 243 metres (797 ft)
- Number of drops: 1
- Watercourse: Surprise Creek

The Surprise Creek Falls, a segmented waterfall on the Surprise Creek, is located in the UNESCO World Heritage–listed Wet Tropics in the Far North region of Queensland, Australia.

== Location and features ==
The Surprise Creek Falls are situated in the Barron Gorge National Park, north-east of Cairns and descend from the Atherton Tableland into the Baron Gorge below. The falls are located near Barron Gorge Hydroelectric Power Station and cascade 243 metres (797 ft) into the gorge.

== See also ==
- List of waterfalls
- List of waterfalls in Australia
