= Din Din =

Din Din may refer to:

- DinDin (born 1991), South Korean rapper
- Barron Falls, a steep tiered cascade waterfall on the Barron River located where the river descends from the Atherton Tablelands to the Cairns coastal plain, in Queensland, Australia
