= Kuranda Scenic Railway =

Railway line in Queensland, Australia

Coordinates: 16°53′05.63″S 145°42′07″E

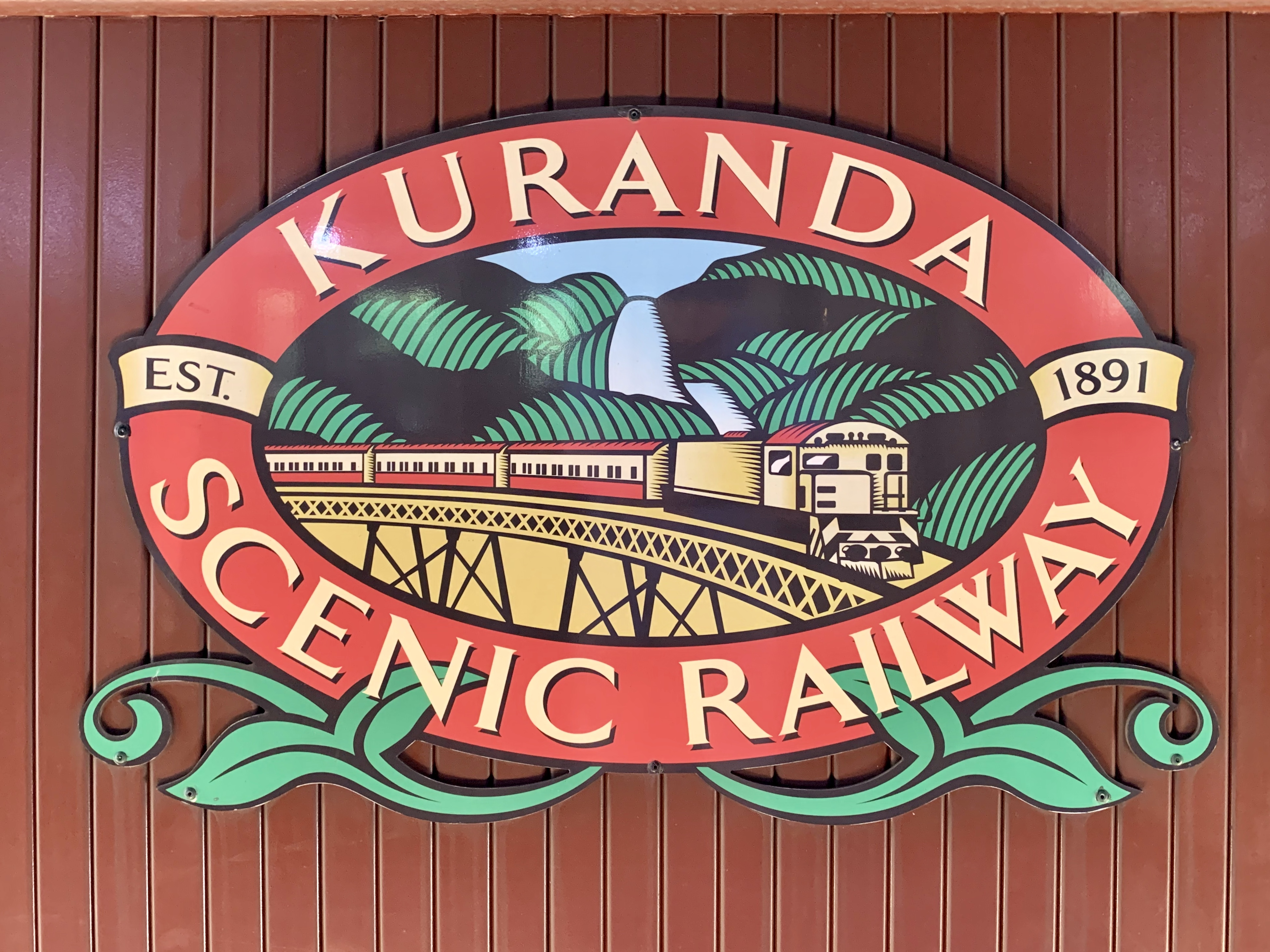

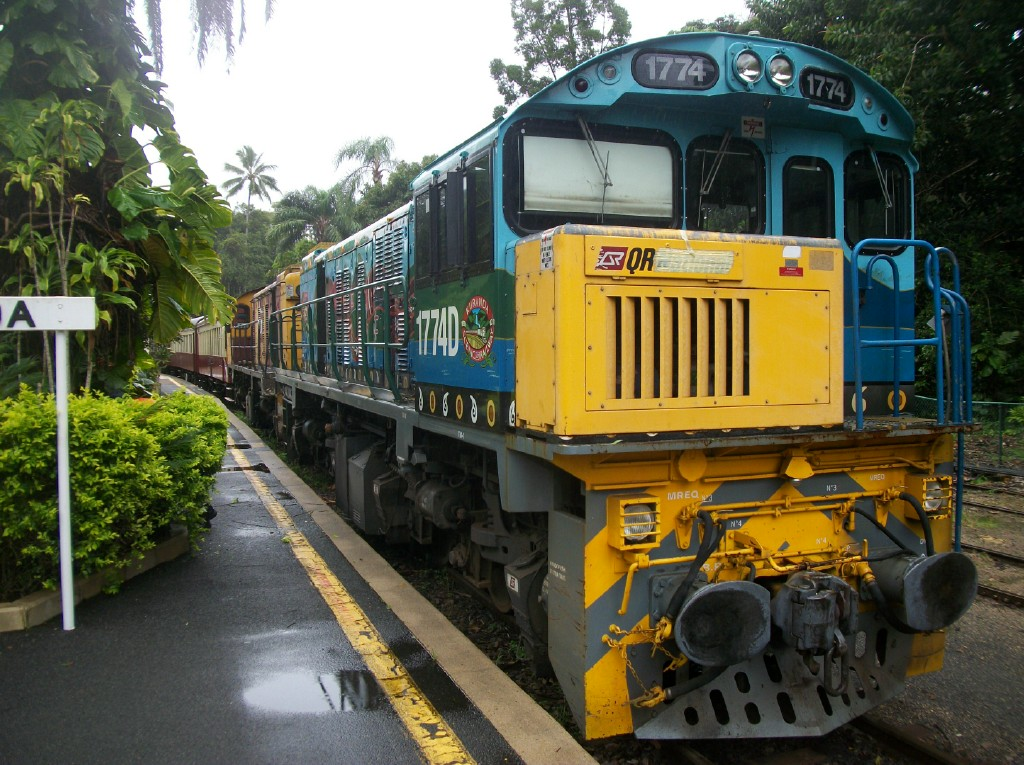
- Kuranda railway station

Overview
- Headquarters: Brisbane
- Locale: Kuranda
- Dates of operation: 1891–present

Technical
- Track gauge: 1,067 mm
- Length: 37 km (23 mi)

Other
- Website: www.ksr.com.au

The Kuranda Scenic Railway is a tourist railway service in Australia that operates along the heritage-listed Cairns-to-Kuranda railway line. Constructed in 1891, the line runs from Cairns, Queensland, over the Great Dividing Range to the town of Kuranda on the Atherton Tableland. The route passes through the Macalister Range, as well as the suburbs of Stratford, Freshwater and Redlynch.

The railway line is 37 km (23 mi) in length. While this service is the predominant use of the line, it is still used for some freight and other passenger services including The Savannahlander. It operates daily throughout the year, with the exception of Christmas Day. A one-way trip takes approximately one hour and 55 minutes.

== Attractions ==
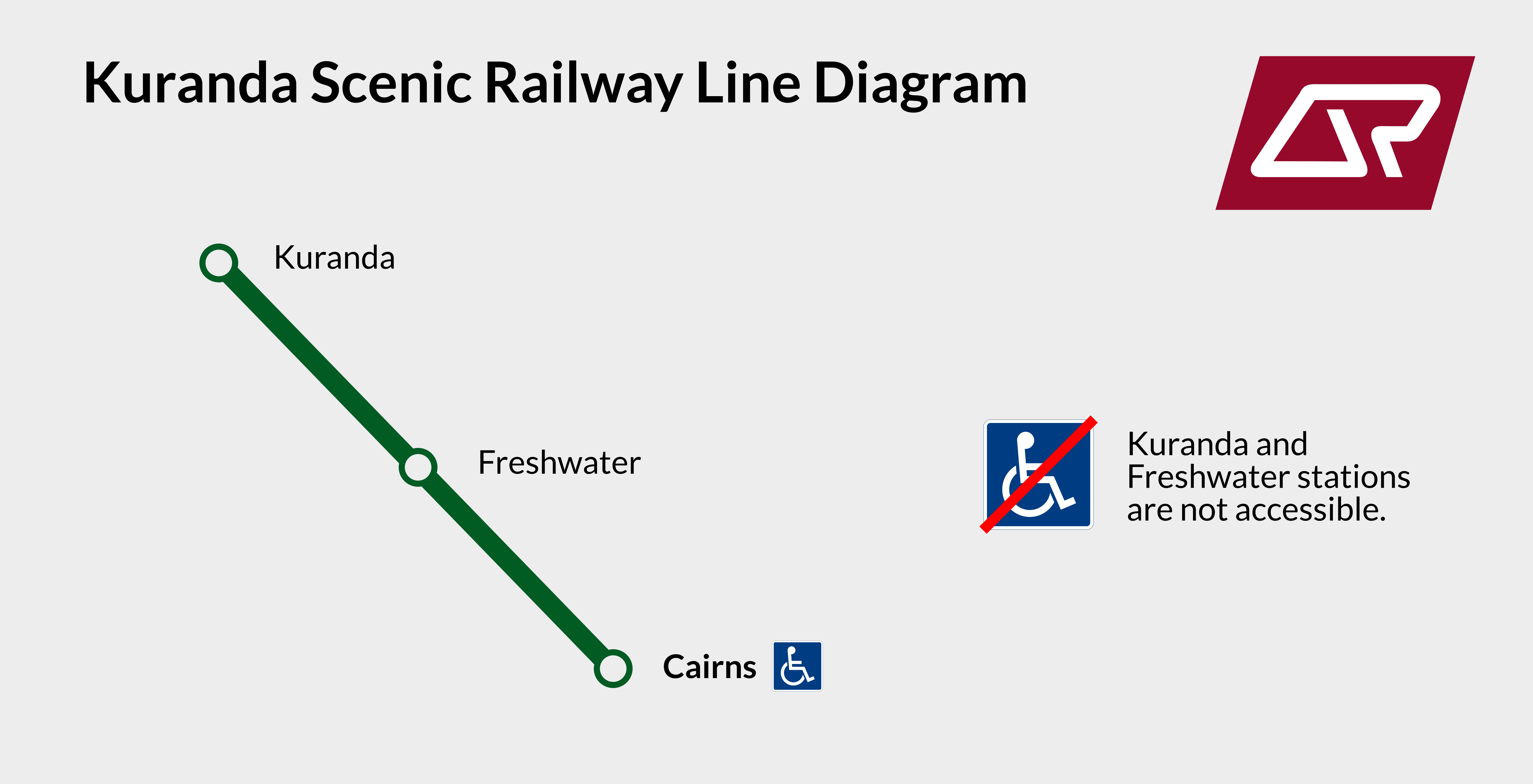
Route diagram of QR's Kuranda Scenic Railway

Kuranda rail station is located near tropical gardens and a short walk from Kuranda town which has a zoo, markets, art galleries and Aboriginal crafts available.

The journey itself traverses Barron Gorge National Park with views of Barron Falls, as well as other smaller waterfalls, including Stoney Creek Falls, along the way. As the train travels, a detailed and informative commentary of the railways' construction is provided..

At the bottom of the mountain, Freshwater railway station has an information centre, a gift shop, and a café that is housed inside an old train carriage.

== History ==
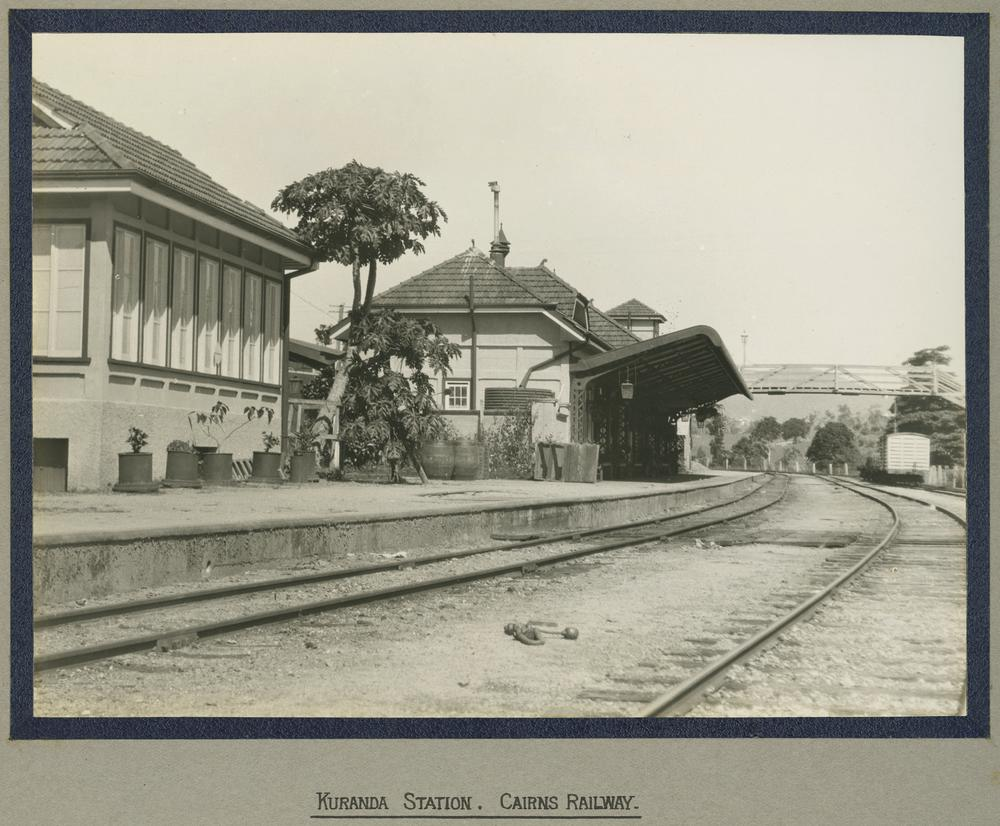
Kuranda station in 1924

Construction of the railway began in 1886 and was completed as far as Kuranda by 1891. Passenger services began operations on 25 June 1891.

Many people died during the construction of the numerous tunnels and bridges of the line. 15 hand-made tunnels and 37 bridges were built to climb from sea level to 328 metres (1,076 ft), up the Macalister Range. Three million cubic metres of earth had to be excavated during construction.

The first operation of a tourist train from Cairns to Kuranda was in 1936, using four longitudinal seating carriages. In 1995, major repairs had to be carried out after a severe rock fall damaged the track. On 26 March 2010, the train was derailed by a landslide injuring 5 of the 250 passengers on board. The service was closed until 7 May 2010 in which during its closing, a geotechnical review of the track and risk assessments were completed.

== Awards ==
In 2009 as part of the Q150 celebrations, the Kuranda Scenic Railway was announced as one of the Q150 Icons of Queensland for its role as a "structure and engineering feat".

== Gallery ==
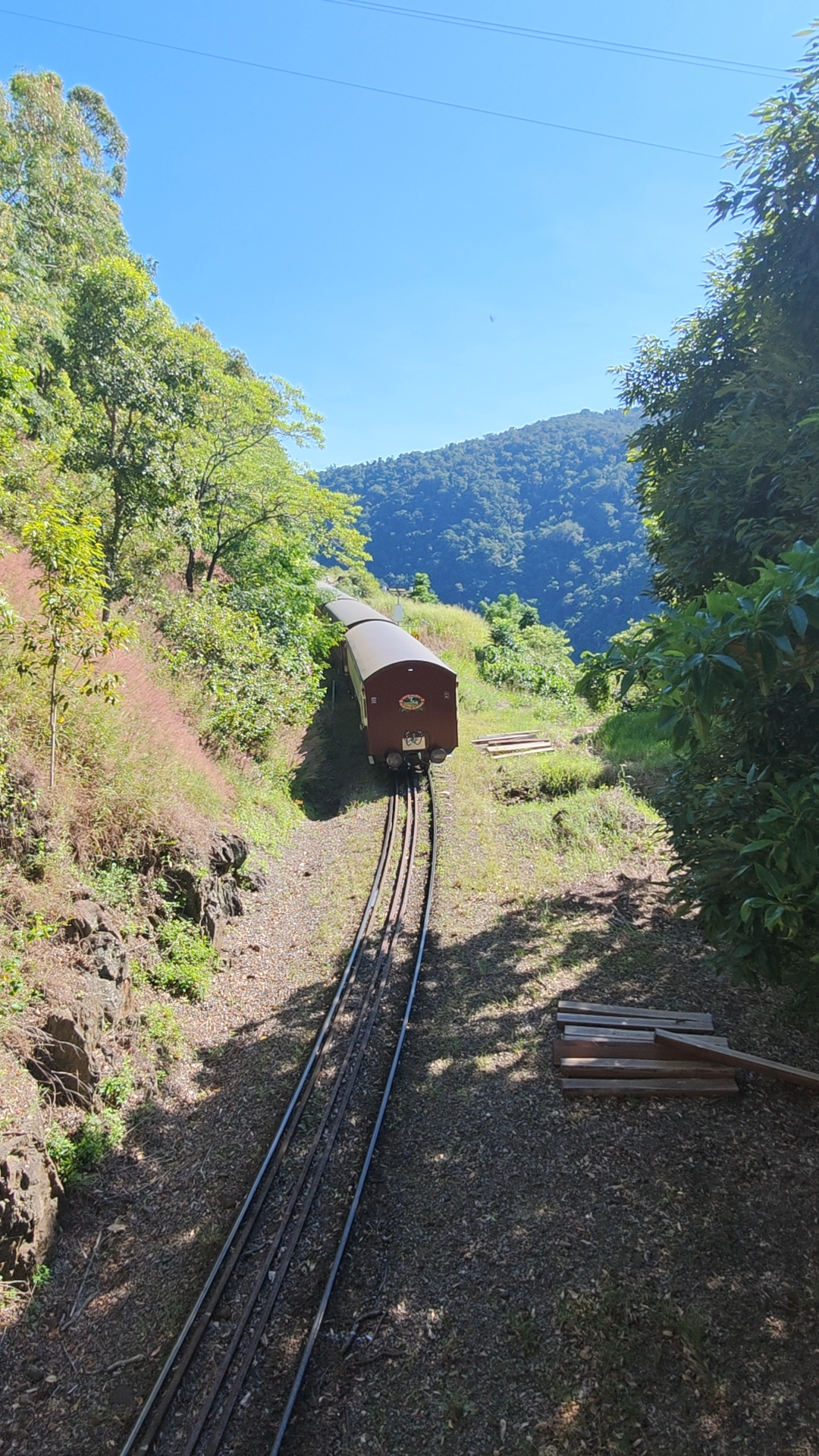
Kuranda Scenic Rail Train Passing Rocky Lookout Bridge

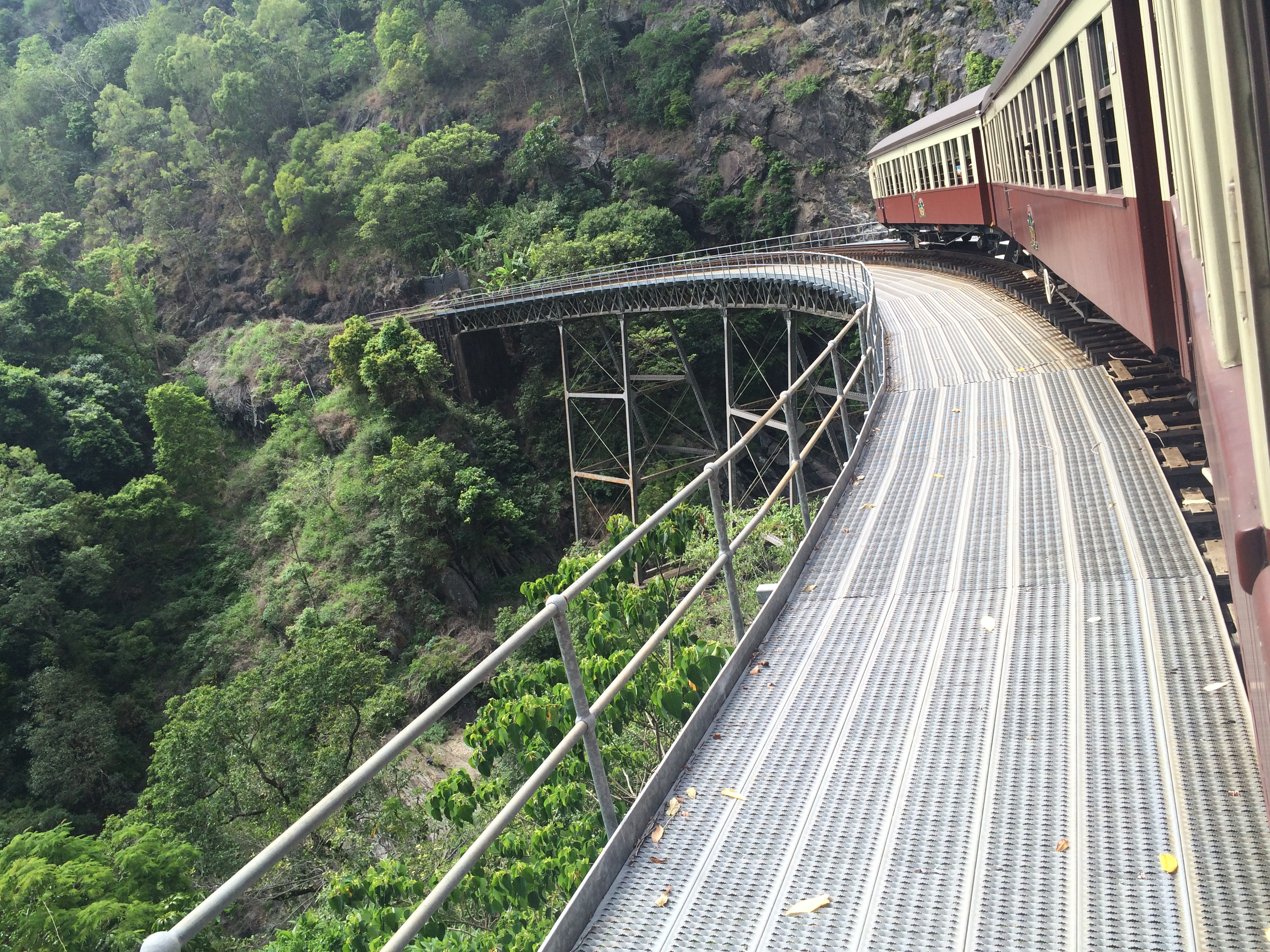
Kuranda Scenic Railway on top of a bridge

== See also ==
- Construction of Queensland railways
- Skyrail Rainforest Cableway
