= Stoney Creek Falls =

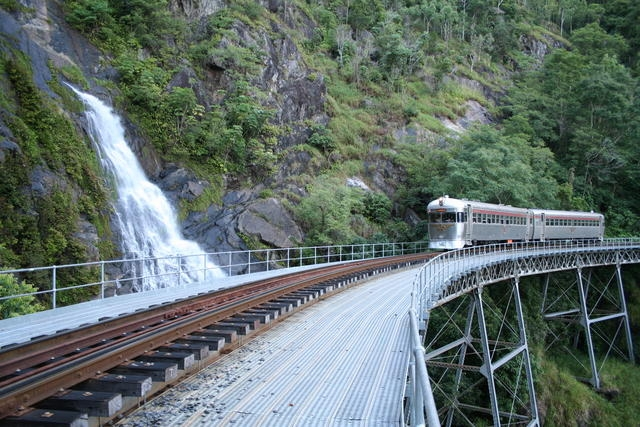
- The Savannahlander passes Stoney Creek Falls.

- Location within Queensland
- Location: Atherton Tablelands, Queensland, Australia
- Coordinates: 16°52′50″S 145°39′04″E
- Type: Cascade
- Watercourse: Stoney Creek

The Stoney Creek Falls is a cascade waterfall on the Stoney Creek located where the river descends from the Atherton Tablelands to the Cairns coastal plain, in Queensland, Australia.

== Location and features ==
Protected within the Barron Gorge National Park, the falls are formed where Stoney Creek starts to descend in steps from the shoulders of the gorge. The falls are best known for the curved lattice railway bridge that passes in front of them. This gives passengers aboard the Kuranda Scenic Railway and The Savannahlander an excellent view of the falls as their train crosses the creek.

== See also ==
- List of waterfalls
- List of waterfalls in Australia
