= Barron Gorge National Park =

National park in Australia

- IUCN category II (national park)
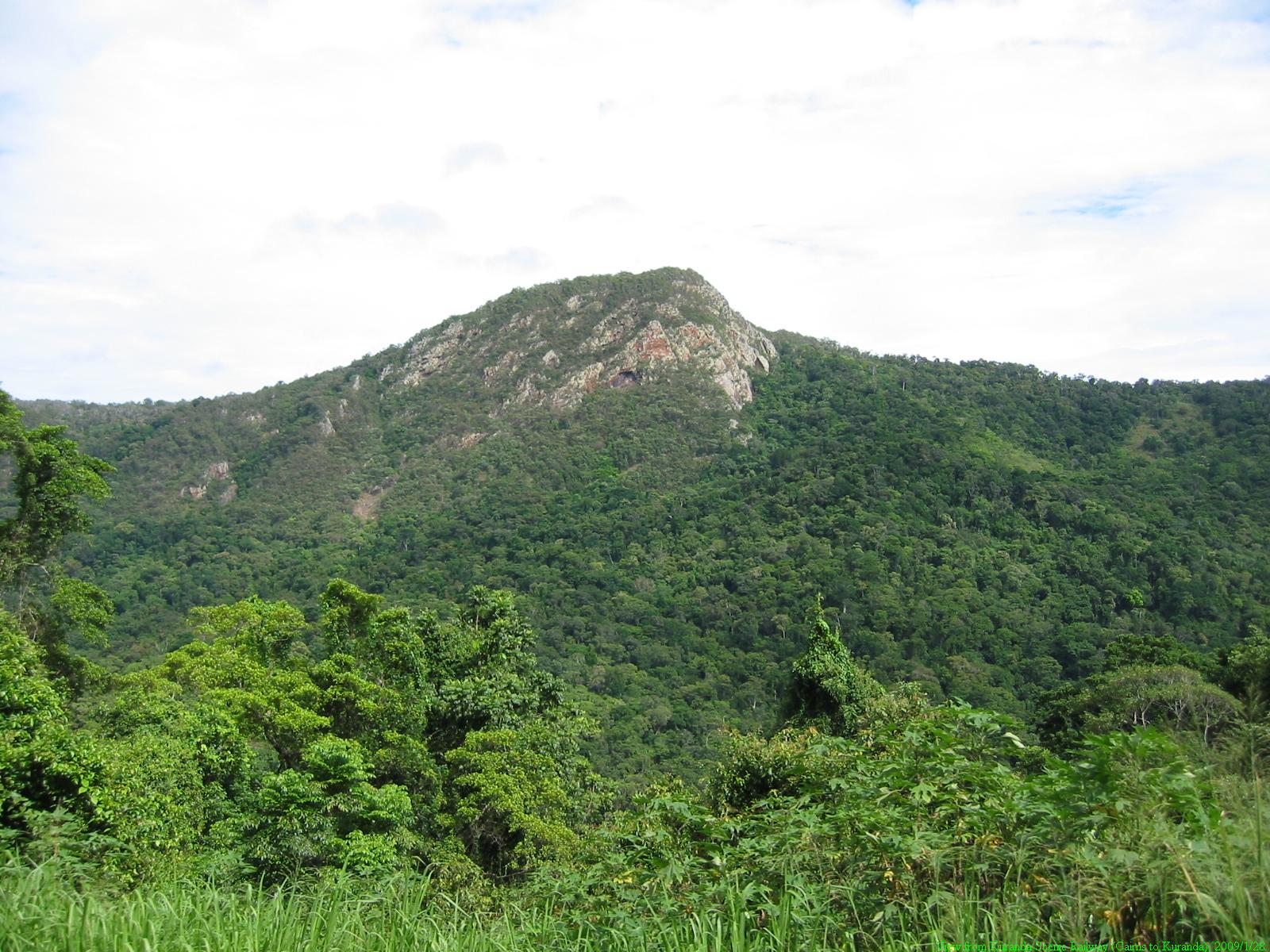
- Glacier Rock, 2009

- Location within Queensland
- Location: Queensland
- Nearest city: Cairns
- Coordinates: 16°50′34″S 145°39′08″E
- Area: 28 km^{2} (11 sq mi)
- Established: 1940
- Governing body: Queensland Parks and Wildlife Service
- Website: https://parks.desi.qld.gov.au/parks/barron-gorge

Barron Gorge National Park is a protected area in the Cairns Region, Queensland, Australia. It lies predominantly within the locality of Barron Gorge.

== Geography ==
The park is 1,404 km northwest of Brisbane and 2 kilometres (1.2 mi) from Kuranda. Barron Gorge is part of the Wet Tropics World Heritage Area. Skyrail Rainforest Cableway is a 7.5 kilometre scenic cableway running above the Barron Gorge National Park in the Wet Tropics of Queensland's World Heritage Area north of Cairns which has won more than 25 awards. The Kuranda Scenic Railway line passes through the park with a station at Barron Falls. Two trains run from and return to Cairns daily. The original weir, constructed in 1934 at the top of the falls, is visible from the station lookout and Skyrail's Barron Falls Station lookouts.

== Landforms ==
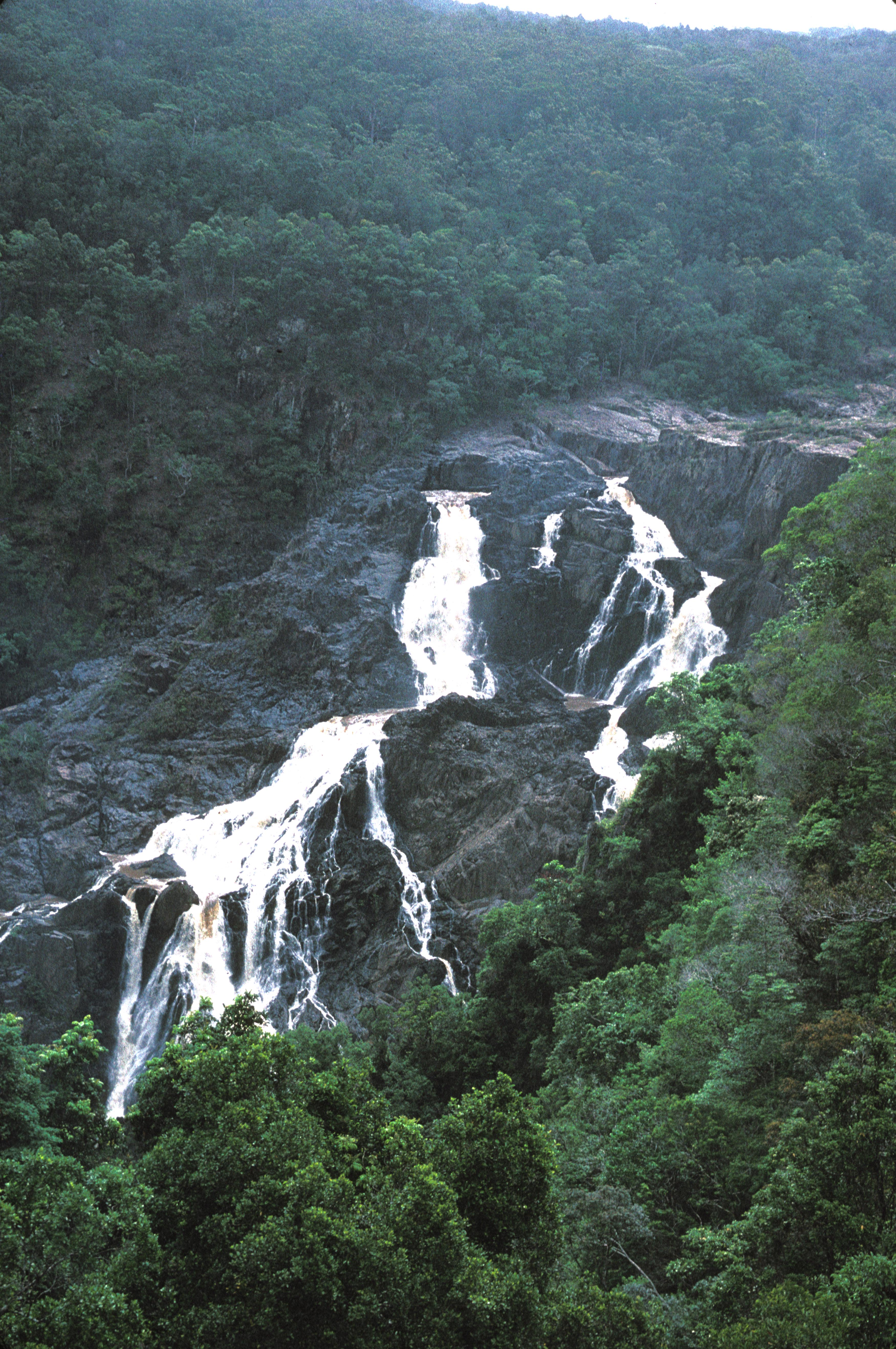
View from the Skyrail Rainforest Cableway

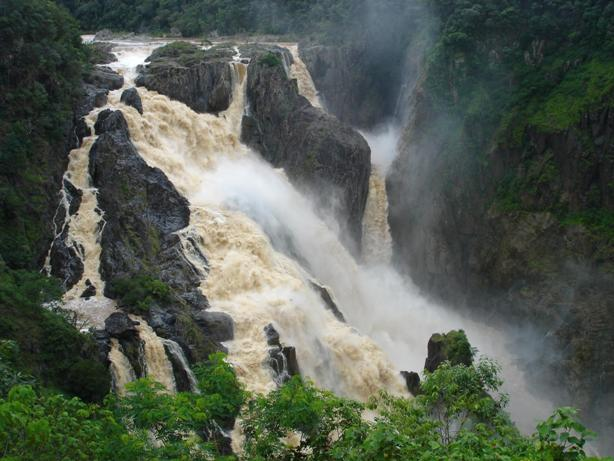
Barron Falls

Barron Gorge formed where the Barron River passes over the eastern escarpment of the Atherton Tablelands. Barron Falls cascade 265 m to the gorge below. Two waterfalls—Stoney Creek Falls and Surprise Creek Falls—exist on tributaries of the Barron River within the park. Slopes around the gorge are steep with some at a 45° angle. This made construction of the railway hazardous. 23 people died during its construction.

== History ==
In 1885, the explorer Archibald Meston described the Barron Falls in flood where the raging waters "rush together like wild horses as they enter the straight in the dread finish of their last race ... (where) the currents of air created by the cataract waved the branches of the trees hundreds of feet overhead ... the rock shook like a mighty steamer tumbling with the vibrations of the screw."

In 1935, the waters of the Barron River were harnessed in the Barron Gorge Hydroelectric Power Station to generate Queensland's first hydroelectric power. Two hundred metres from the base of the Barron Falls an underground power station was carved into the cliff face. Water was delivered through pipes to drive the turbines, two 1,200 kW turbo-alternators. The substation, workshops and staff houses were built around the area now forming the Skyrail station.

The Djabugandji Bama (Aboriginal people) are the traditional owners of the area known as Djirri Nyundu Nyrrumba, which includes Barron Gorge National Park. Ownership of the park returned to its traditional owners on 17 December 2004. This is the first park in Queensland to have a native title determination. Visitors to the park have not faced any changes under the new owners but Aboriginals were then able to hold traditional religious ceremonies.

== Flora and fauna ==
Bird's-nest fern and elkhorn ferns grow amongst Candlenut, Corkwood, Native olive and False Red Sandalwood trees at the bottom of the gorge.

The park forms part of the Wooroonooran Important Bird Area, identified as such by BirdLife International because it supports populations of a range of bird species endemic to Queensland's Wet Tropics. Noisy pittas and the orange-footed scrubfowl are two species of bird that may be commonly seen. The southern cassowary is occasionally spotted in the southern section of the park. Nocturnal animals are relatively common. These include a variety of possums and flying foxes as well as Lumholtz's tree-kangaroo and the northern quoll.

== See also ==
- Protected areas of Queensland
