= Barron Falls =

Barron Falls Din Din
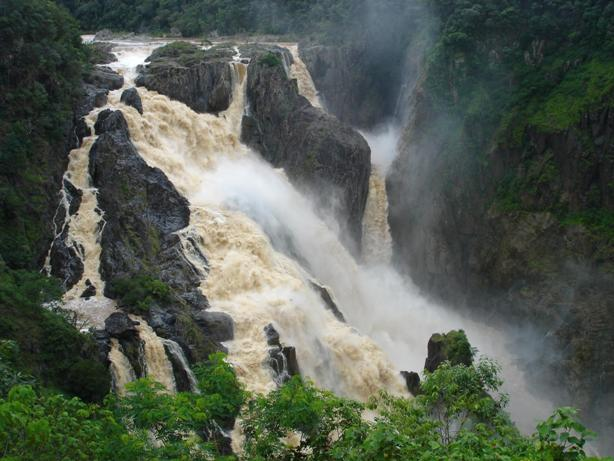
- Barron Falls in the wet season

- Location within Queensland
- Location: Kuranda, Queensland, Australia
- Coordinates: 16°49′59″S 145°38′35″E
- Type: Steep Tiered Cascade
- Total height: 125 metres (410 ft)
- Number of drops: 4
- Longest drop: 107 metres (351 ft)
- Total width: 259 metres (850 ft)
- Average width: 137 metres (449 ft)
- Watercourse: Barron River
- Average flow rate: 30 cubic metres per second (1,100 cu ft/s)

Barron Falls (Djabugay: Din Din) is a steep tiered cascade waterfall in Kuranda, Shire of Mareeba, Queensland, Australia. The falls are created by the Barron River descending from the Atherton Tablelands to the Cairns coastal plain.

In 2009 as part of the Q150 celebrations, the Barron Falls was announced as one of the Q150 Icons of Queensland for its role as a "natural attraction".

== Location and features ==
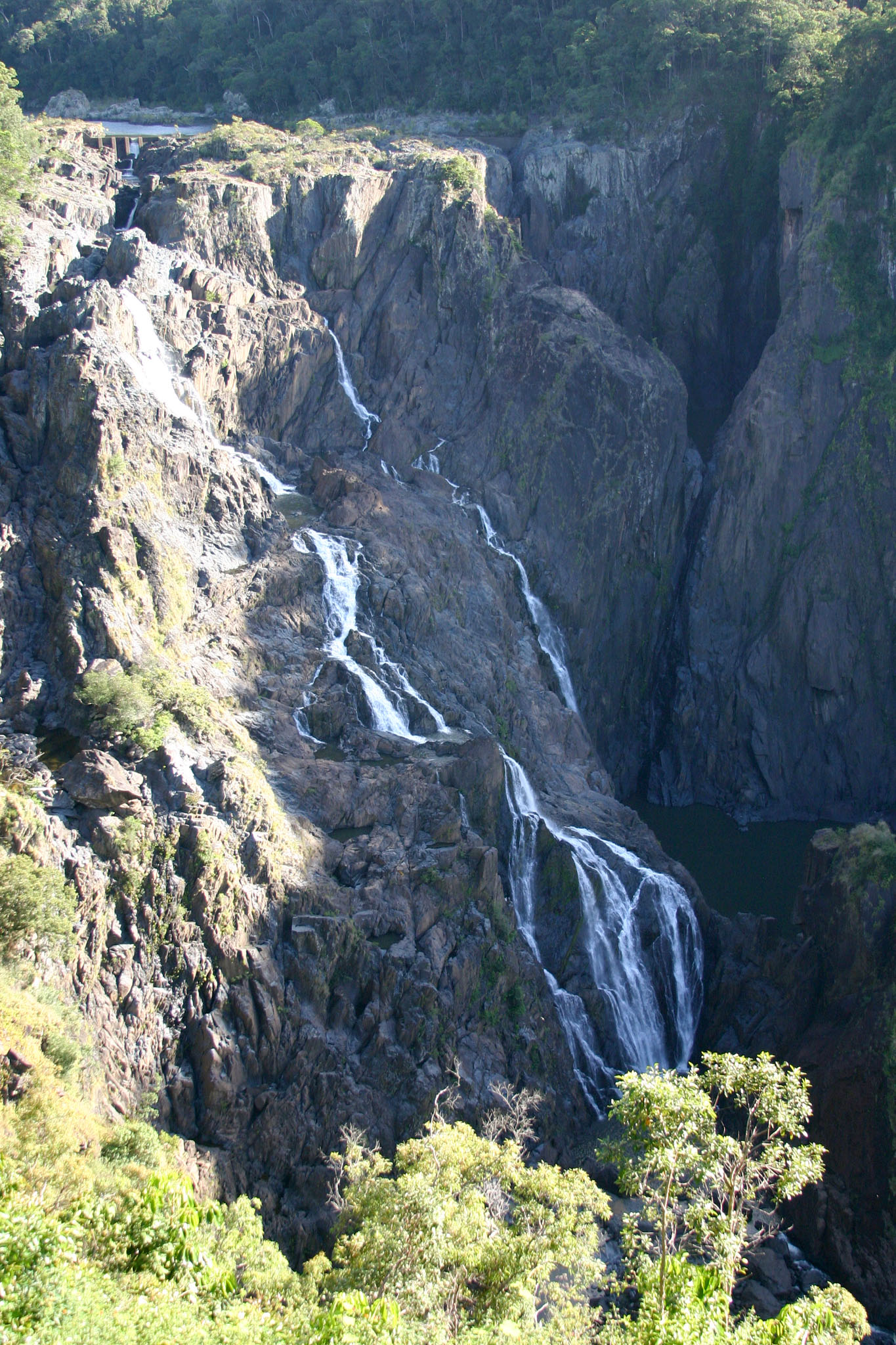
Barron Falls in dry season

Video of Barron Falls in flood

Protected within the Barron Gorge National Park, the volume of water seen in the upper photo only occurs after substantial rainfall during the wet season. For much of the rest of the year, little more than a trickle is evident, due in part to the presence of a weir behind the head of the falls that supplies the Barron Gorge Hydroelectric Power Station located downstream in the gorge.

The Barron Falls may be viewed and reached by road via the Kennedy Highway that crosses the Barron River upstream of the falls, near Kuranda. The narrow-gauge Kuranda Scenic Railway and the Skyrail gondola also lead from the coastal plain to the tablelands. The train stops at Barron Falls overlook, where passengers may disembark for several minutes. The Skyrail stops at two rainforest mid-stations, Red Peak and Barron Falls. The trail at Barron Falls Skyrail station leads through the rainforest to three separate lookouts providing views of the Gorge and Falls.

== Etymology ==
The falls were named for Thomas Henry Bowman Barron, the Chief Clerk of Police in Brisbane in the 1860s.

== Tourist attraction ==
The falls were one of the most popular tourist attractions in Queensland by the 1890s. Visitors are drawn to the natural features and scenery.

== See also ==
- List of waterfalls
- List of waterfalls in Australia
