= Barron Gorge Hydroelectric Power Station =

Australian electricity power station

- Country: Australia
- Location: Cairns, Queensland
- Coordinates: 16°51′04″S 145°38′48″E
- Status: Operational
- Commission date: 1963
- Owner: CleanCo Queensland

Power generation
- Units operational: 2
- Nameplate capacity: 66 MW (89,000 hp)
- Annual net output: 264.2 GWh (2008/09)

External links
- Website: cleancoqueensland.com.au

The Barron Gorge Hydroelectric Power Station (or Barron Gorge Hydro) in Queensland, Australia, is an electricity power station commissioned in 1963 with a maximum capacity of 66 megawatts (89,000 hp). It is in the locality of Barron Gorge in the Wet Tropics World Heritage Area 20 kilometres (12 mi) north-west of Cairns. It replaced an earlier station which was the first underground power station in the country and the first hydroelectric station in Queensland. The power station was refurbished in 2006.

== History ==
The conceptualisation for construction of a hydroelectric power station on the Barron River was first suggested in 1906. It was nearly 30 years before completion was realised. The 3.8 MW plant was the first underground power station in Australia and supplied the Cairns area with electricity for 28 years. The site presented many challenges including precipitous cliffs, torrential rain, and raging floods.

During the initial construction phase the delivery of equipment was complex. It first came by train to a rail siding, was transferred over the falls, and then was lowered by tramway to the work site below. Hauling equipment from Cairns was relatively easy. There was no road in the early 1930s, but there was the railway on the opposite bank. Getting across the gorge was another matter. A flying fox was constructed to solve that problem. A weir was built in 1935, to even out seasonal variations in flow.

A fragile bridge was also constructed across the top of the Barron Falls, however this failed to withstand the floods. Plans to build an outdoor station were abandoned as earthworks proved too unstable. Going underground proved relatively easy following construction of the tramway down the near vertical cliff-face.

In November 1935, the Governor of Queensland, Sir Leslie Orme Wilson, officially opened Barron Gorge, Queensland's first hydroelectric power station. Demand for power soon exceeded supply, and in 1940 the two 1,200-kilowatt (1,600 hp) turbo alternators were supplemented by a 1,400-kilowatt (1,900 hp) unit. The original site was largely dismantled and decommissioned in 1959 and the present Barron Falls power station was commissioned in 1963 further down stream. A new, larger power station was needed to supply the rapidly growing demand in north Queensland. Construction of the new power station began on 6 October 1960 ,and it was expected to cost £2,055,000.

The weir was raised for the new power station. Water enters a concrete intake tower and then flows through a 2.9-metre (9 ft 6 in) wide horizontal tunnel for 1.6 kilometres (0.99 mi). It then flows downwards for 286 metres (938 ft) along an angled tunnel for 400 metres (1,300 ft) before branching into two distribution pipes leading to the turbines.

In 1988, the Queensland Government approved plans to automate the power station. The benefits were the reduced need for on-site staff.

== Site ==
Barron Falls is visible from the surrounding forest and rock. From the far upstream end of the station (Kuranda), residual white quartz can be seen in at the distant downstream end of the gorge. Along this seam is a small dark hole, which was the power station's wastewater outlet and is about 10 feet tall.

== Refurbishment ==
In 2003, Stanwell Corporation Limited developed a $28 million strategic plan to extend the life of Barron Gorge Hydro for 40 years.

Phase one was completed in 2006 and included a mid-life refit, upgrading the majority of the originally installed electrical plant. This was the largest project undertaken at the power station since its original construction. Phase two of the program consisted of the refurbishment of both the hydro's generators. Unit 1 generator was refurbished in 2009, and Unit 2 in 2011 by Dowding and Mills UK and Australia. The generator refurbishment project improved the reliability and efficiency of the generating units as well as increased the maximum electrical output capacity of Barron Gorge Hydro.

== Visitors' centre ==
The Barron Gorge Hydro Visitors' Centre is no longer open to the public.

== See also ==
- List of active power stations in Queensland
