= List of schools in Far North Queensland =

This is a list of schools in the Far North Queensland region of Queensland, Australia. The region's largest population centre is Cairns. It includes the local government areas of:

- Shire of Aurukun
- Shire of Burke
- Cairns Region
- Shire of Carpentaria
- Cassowary Coast Region
- Shire of Cook
- Shire of Croydon
- Aboriginal Shire of Doomadgee
- Shire of Douglas
- Shire of Etheridge
- Aboriginal Shire of Hope Vale
- Aboriginal Shire of Kowanyama
- Aboriginal Shire of Lockhart River
- Aboriginal Shire of Mapoon
- Shire of Mornington
- Aboriginal Shire of Napranum
- Shire of Mareeba
- Northern Peninsula Area Region
- Aboriginal Shire of Pormpuraaw
- Tablelands Region
- Shire of Torres
- Torres Strait Island Region
- Weipa Town
- Aboriginal Shire of Wujal Wujal
- Aboriginal Shire of Yarrabah

Prior to 2015, the Queensland education system consisted of primary schools, which accommodated students from Kindergarten to Year 7 (ages 5–13), and high schools, which accommodate students from Years 8 to 12 (ages 12–18). However, from 2015, Year 7 became the first year of high school.

== State schools ==
=== State primary schools ===
State primary schools are Prep to Year 6 unless otherwise indicated.

Name	Suburb	LGA	Opened	Coordinates	Notes
Alexandra Bay State School	Diwan	Douglas	1986	16.2138°S 145.4222°E	Lot 1 Cape Tribulation Road.
Aloomba State School	Aloomba	Cairns	1899	17.1098°S 145.8319°E	Nielsen Street.
Atherton State School	Atherton	Tablelands	1891	17.2616°S 145.4816°E	28 Armstrong Street.
Balaclava State School	Mooroobool	Cairns	1954	16.9367°S 145.7449°E	418 Mulgrave Road.
Bartle Frere State School	Bartle Frere	Cairns	1922	17.4446°S 145.8852°E	29 Price Road.
Bellenden Ker State School	Bellenden Ker	Cairns	1922	17.2666°S 145.9251°E	77 Harvey Creek Road.
Biboohra State School	Biboohra	Mareeba	1902	16.9158°S 145.4191°E	On Petersen Street.
Bloomfield River State School	Bloomfield	Cook	1952	15.9352°S 145.3413°E	At 3202 Rossville-Bloomfield Road.
Burketown State School	Burketown	Burke	1888	17.7389°S 139.5478°E	51 Beames Street.
Butchers Creek State School	Butchers Creek	Tablelands	1913	17.3612°S 145.6922°E	On the corner of Topaz and Gadaloff Roads.
Cairns West State School	Manunda	Cairns	1964	16.9232°S 145.7424°E	Mayers Street.
Cape York Aboriginal Australian Academy – Coen Campus	Coen	Cook	1895	13.9455°S 143.1999°E	Coen State School until 2009; part of Western Cape College until 2012; then campus of the Cape York Aboriginal Australian Academy. On the Peninsula Developmental Road.
Cape York Aboriginal Australian Academy – Hope Vale Campus	Hope Vale	Hope Vale	1949	15.2952°S 145.1080°E	Formerly Hopevale SS until 2012, then the Hope Vale campus of the Cape York Aboriginal Australian Academy. On the corner of Thiele and Poland Streets.
Caravonica State School	Caravonica	Cairns	1927	16.8529°S 145.6953°E	Lot 3 Kamerunga Road.
Cardwell State School	Cardwell	Cassowary Coast	1870	18.2687°S 146.0308°E	43 Victoria Street.
Chillagoe State School	Chillagoe	Mareeba	1902	17.1553°S 144.5211°E	On Cathedral Street.
Croydon State School	Croydon	Croydon	1890	18.2037°S 142.2493°E	22–30 Brown Street.
Daintree State School	Daintree	Douglas	1924	16.2493°S 145.3202°E	Osborne Street.
Dimbulah State School	Dimbulah	Mareeba	1914	17.1489°S 145.1131°E	Prep –Year 10. At 48–50 Kennedy Street .
Doomadgee State School	Doomadgee	Doomadgee	1933	17.9420°S 138.8277°E	Early Childhood to Year 10. In Goodeedawa Road.
Edge Hill State School	Edge Hill	Cairns	1940	16.9063°S 145.74283°E	Pease Street.
El Arish State School	El Arish	Cassowary Coast	1922	17.8078°S 146.0026°E	At 28 Chauvel Street.
Feluga State School	Feluga	Cassowary Coast	1927	17.8807°S 145.9652°E	Feluga Provisional School opened on 7 February 1927 with 25 students in the Feluga Hall. Circa 1934, it became Feluga State School on its current site (107 Feluga Road) about 300 metres (980 ft) down the road from the hall.
Flying Fish Point State School	Flying Fish Point	Cassowary Coast	1899	17.4996°S 146.0750°E	Maud Street.
Forsayth State School	Forsayth	Etheridge	1895	18.5897°S 143.6025°E	(Early Childhood- Year 6. Originally opened as Charleston State School, renamed Forsayth State School in 1920. At Third Street.
Freshwater State School	Freshwater	Cairns	1896	16.8802°S 145.7141°E	At 10 Corkill Street.
Georgetown State School	Georgetown	Etheridge	1874	18.2947°S 143.5473°E	Early Childhood to Year 6. High Street.
Goondi State School	Goondi Bend	Cassowary Coast	1898	17.5228°S 146.0099°E	At 78 Maple Street.
Gordonvale State School	Gordonvale	Cairns	1897	17.0900°S 145.7850°E	Opened 1897 as Mulgrave State School, renamed 1914 Gordonvale State School. At 28 George Street.
Hambledon State School	Edmonton	Cairns	1887	17.0212°S 145.7356°E	At 77–83 Stokes Street.
Herberton State School	Herberton	Tablelands	1881–1994	17.3805°S 145.3825°E	The primary school was originally in Grace Street, Herberton, where the secondary school continues to operate.
Herberton State School	Herberton & Moomin	Tablelands	1994–	17.3723°S 145.3790°E	In 1994, a new primary school campus was developed at Elwyn Phillip Memorial Drive in Moonmin, while the secondary school campus remained at the original school site in Grace Street, Herberton.
Innisfail State School	Innisfail	Cassowary Coast	1887–1908	17.5239°S 146.0278°E	Geraldton Provisional School opened on 18 July 1887 in the present-day Anzac Memorial Park on the corner of the Bruce Highway and Ernest Street with an initial enrolment of 15 boys and 13 girls under head teacher Thomas Edward White. On 1 August 1894, it became Geraldton State School. The original school site is commemorated with a plaque laid on 4 July 1987.
Innisfail State School	Innisfail	Cassowary Coast	1908-	17.5183°S 146.0280°E	On 21 January 1908, the school relocated to Emily Street. On 8 April 1913, the name was changed to Innisfail State School to reflect the renaming of the town.
Innisfail East State School	East Innisfail	Cassowary Coast	1936	17.5347°S 146.0327°E	At 92 Mourilyan Road.
Irvinebank State School	Irvinebank	Mareeba	1886	17.4268°S 145.2041°E	At 11 High Street . Listed on the Queensland Heritage Register.
Isabella State School	Edmonton	Cairns	2007	17.0156°S 145.7231°E	On Walker Road.
Julatten State School	Julatten	Mareeba	1923	16.6077°S 145.3421°E	Known as Bushy Creek State School until 1975. At 1141 Euluma Creek Road .
Kairi State School	Kairi	Tablelands	1911–1930		Kairi State School opened on 24 July 1911 with 12 students under head teacher Leila May Higgins. The original proposed name for the school was Innesfail State School.
Kairi State School	Kairi	Tablelands	1930-	17.2151°S 145.5459°E	In 1930, the school building was relocated to its current location by a bullock team. The new location was more central and near the railway crossing. After the relocation, an additional classroom was added. In McGeehan Street.
Karumba State School	Karumba	Carpentaria	1968	17.4829°S 140.8403°E	At 5 Yappar Street.
Kennedy State School	Kennedy	Cassowary Coast	1927	18.2092°S 145.9421°E	At 161 Kennedy Creek Road.
Kowanyama State School	Kowanyama	Kowanyama	1904	15.4721°S 141.7451°E	Early Childhood to Year 10. Originally known as Trubanamen Mission School (Church of England) and then from 1916 as the Mitchell River State School. Circa 1975–1980 the school and community began to use the name Kowanyama. At 345 Kowanyama Street.
Lakeland State School	Lakeland	Cook	1969	15.8569°S 144.8568°E	On the corner of Peninsula Developmental Road and the Mulligan Highway.
Laura State School	Laura	Cook	1968	15.5575°S 144.4469°E	Early Childhood to Year 6. In Terminus Street.
Lower Tully State School	Lower Tully	Cassowary Coast	1932	17.9952°S 146.0005°E	6 Collins Road.
Machans Beach State School	Machans Beach	Cairns	1952	16.8526°S 145.7449°E	61 Machan Street.
Malanda State School	Malanda	Tablelands	1913	17.3489°S 145.5946°E	At 24 Mary Street.
Mareeba State School	Mareeba	Mareeba	1893	16.9919°S 145.4249°E	In Constance Street.
McDonnell Creek State School	Fishery Falls	Cairns	1913	17.1966°S 145.8973°E	At 69273 Bruce Highway.
Mena Creek State School	Mena Creek	Cassowary Coast	1920	17.6547°S 145.9555°E	On Mena Creek Road.
Miallo State School	Miallo	Douglas	1911	16.3888°S 145.3761°E	On Miallo Bamboo Creek Road.
Millaa Millaa State School	Millaa Millaa	Tablelands	1918	17.5127°S 145.6101°E	At 1 Beech Street on the corner with Palm Avenue.
Mirriwinni State School	Mirriwinni	Cairns	1916	17.4022°S 145.9097°E	Historically spelled Miriwinni, but officially standardised as Mirriwinni in 2010. At 3 Whitman Street.
Mission Beach State School	Wongaling Beach	Cassowary Coast	1953	17.9042°S 146.0925°E	On Webb Road.
Mornington Island State School	Mornington Island	Mornington	1975	16.6663°S 139.1825°E	Early Childhood to Year 10. At Lardil Street.
Mossman State School	Mossman	Douglas	1898	16.4617°S 145.3743°E	At 30–34 Front Street.
Mount Garnet State School	Mount Garnet	Tablelands	1901	17.6802°S 145.1215°E	At Garnet Street.
Mount Molloy State School	Mount Molloy	Mareeba	1906–????		Mount Molloy State School opened on 23 July 1906 at Bakers Road. officially opened in 1976 at its current location.
Mount Molloy State School	Mount Molloy	Mareeba	????-1976		It was relocated on two occasions due to flooding.
Mount Molloy State School	Mount Molloy	Mareeba	1976 -	16.6737°S 145.3348°E	In 1976, the school officially opened at its current location, 30–40 Fraser Road.
Mount Surprise State School	Mount Surprise	Etheridge	1917	18.1465°S 144.3199°E	At Garland Street.
Mourilyan State School	Mourilyan	Cassowary Coast	1908	17.5851°S 146.0442°E	At 34 Mourilyan Harbour Road.
Mundoo State School	Wangan	Cassowary Coast	1895	17.5667°S 146.0112°E	At 100 Cardier Road on the boundary with neighbouring Mundoo.
Murray River Upper State School	Murray Upper	Cassowary Coast	1904	18.0899°S 145.8505°E	At 1 Middle Murray Road.
Mutchilba State School	Mutchilba	Mareeba	1939	17.1393°S 145.2120°E	At 33 Marsterson Street.
Normanton State School	Normanton	Carpentaria	1882	17.6720°S 141.0790°E	P–10. At 6–12 Little Brown Street.
Northern Peninsula Area College – Bamaga	Bamaga	Northern Peninsula	1964	10.8868°S 142.3901°E	Early Childhood-Year 12. Known as Bamaga State School until March 2005. The primary campus is in Anu Street.
Northern Peninsula Area College – Bamaga	Bamaga	Northern Peninsula		10.8952°S 142.3858°E	The secondary campus is in Sagaukaz Street.
Northern Peninsula Area College – Injinoo	Injinoo	Northern Peninsula	2005	10.9057°S 142.3228°E	The Injinoo Junior campus of the Northern Peninsula Area College is a government primary (Early Childhood-6) campus of Northern Peninsula Area State College at Bowie Street.
Parramatta State School	Parramatta Park	Cairns	1927	16.9251°S 145.7632°E	Early Childhood to Year 6. At 122 Mulgrave Road.
Pormpuraaw State School	Pormpuraaw	Pormpuraaw	1973	14.8987°S 141.6209°E	Early Childhood to Year 6. In Pormpuraaw Street.
Port Douglas State School	Port Douglas	Douglas	1879–1962		Previous school site.
Port Douglas State School	Port Douglas	Douglas	1989	16.5242°S 145.4612°E	At 4 Endeavour Street.
Ravenshoe State School	Ravenshoe	Tablelands	1912	17.6126°S 145.4819°E	Prep-12. It has two sites, a primary school campus in 10 Ascham Street and a secondary school campus on the corner of Moore Street and the Kennedy Highway.
Rossville State School	Rossville	Cook	1988	15.7632°S 145.2683°E	On Angus Gully Road.
Silkwood State School	Silkwood	Cassowary Coast	1916–1918		School at first site burned down in 1918 and lessons were held in a private until a new school building at a new school site was opened in 1920.
Silkwood State School	Silkwood	Cassowary Coast	1920-	17.7364°S 146.0007°E	On Japoon Road.
South Johnstone State School	South Johnstone	Cassowary Coast	1916	17.5934°S 145.9999°E	At East Avenue (corner of North Avenue).
Tagai State College – Badu Island Campus	Badu Island	Torres Strait Island	1905	10.1592°S 142.1632°E	Early Childhood to Year 6. A campus of Tagai State College at 11 Ngurpai Yabu (also known as School Street).
Tagai State College – Dauan Island Campus	Dauan Island	Torres Strait Island	1985	9.4136°S 142.5396°E	On Main Street.
Tagai State College – Darnley Island Campus	Erub Island	Torres Strait Island	1985	9.5952°S 143.7602°E	Known as Darnley Island State School until 2005. On Road No 6 on the south-west of the island.
Tagai State College – Horn Island Campus	Horn Island	Torres	1993		
Tagai State College – Kubin Campus	Kubin (Moa Island)	Torres Strait Island	1985		
Tagai State College – Mabuiag Island Campus	Mabuiag Island	Torres Strait Island	1985		
Tagai State College – Malu Kiwai Campus	Boigu Island	Torres Strait Island	1985		
Tagai State College – Mer Campus	Mer Island	Torres Strait Island	1985		
Tagai State College – Poruma Campus	Poruma Island	Torres Strait Island	1985		Coconut Island SS until 2005
Tagai State College – Saibai Island Campus	Saibai Island	Torres Strait Island	1985		
Tagai State College – St Pauls Campus	St Pauls (Moa Island)	Torres Strait Island	1985		
Tagai State College – Stephen Island Campus	Ugar Island	Torres Strait Island	1985		
Tagai State College – Thursday Island primary Campus	Thursday Island	Torres	1885		
Tagai State College – Warraber Island Campus	Warraber Island	Torres Strait Island	1985	10.2063°S 142.8279°E	On Yessie Street in the town of Sue Island.
Tagai State College – Yam Island Campus	Yam Island	Torres Strait Island	1985		
Tagai State College – Yorke Island Campus	Yorke Island	Torres Strait Island	1985		
Tolga State School	Tolga	Tablelands	1895	17.2232°S 145.4775°E	In Main Street.
Trinity Beach State School	Trinity Beach	Cairns	1979	16.7948°S 145.6895°E	At 25–45 Madang Street (corner of Wewak Street).
Tully State School	Tully	Cassowary Coast	1924	17.9386°S 145.9221°E	At 21 Mars Street.
Walkamin State School	Walkamin	Tablelands	1958	17.1282°S 145.4269°E	At 40 Wattle Street.
Western Cape College – Mapoon	Mapoon	Mapoon	1995	12.0161°S 141.8999°E	Known as Mapoon State School until 2002. At 44 Clermont Street.
White Rock State School	White Rock	Cairns	1988	16.9872°S 145.7432°E	At 114-126 Progress Road.
Whitfield State School	Whitfield	Cairns	1989	16.9118°S 145.7288°E	At 42-74 McManus Street.
Wonga Beach State School	Wonga Beach	Douglas	1939	16.3419°S 145.4129°E	At 48-74 Snapper Island Drive.
Woree State School	Woree	Cairns	1980	16.9597°S 145.7413°E	At the corner of Rigg Street and Windarra Streets.
Yarrabah State School	Yarrabah	Yarrabah	1892	16.9079°S 145.8683°E	Early Childhood to Year 10, split over 3 sites. Early Childhood and Prep campus at Workshop Street.
Yarrabah State School	Yarrabah	Yarrabah	1892	16.9059°S 145.8647°E	Primary school (Years 1–6) campus at Gribble Street.
Yarrabah State School	Yarrabah	Yarrabah	1892	16.9288°S 145.8746°E	Secondary campus (Years 7–10) campus at Back Beach Road.
Yorkeys Knob State School	Yorkeys Knob	Cairns	1957–1979	16.8096°S 145.7194°E	Originally located on the corner of Wattle Street and Cunningham Street.
Yorkeys Knob State School	Yorkeys Knob	Cairns	1980	16.8142°S 145.7227°E	Relocated to 26–38 Clinton Street in 1980.
Yungaburra State School	Yungaburra	Tablelands	1909	17.2729°S 145.5857°E	At 4 Maple Street.

=== State high schools and colleges ===
Name	Suburb	LGA	Opened	Coordinates	Notes
Atherton State High School	Atherton	Tablelands	1959	17.2600°S 145.4860°E	7–12. Maunds Road.
Babinda State School	Babinda	Cairns	1914–1969	17.34241°S 145.92151°E	P–12. Opened as a primary school in 1914 in temporary premises, in 1916 the school occupied its first permanent site at 24–34 Church Street. In 1963, added secondary schooling to Year 10
Babinda State School	Babinda	Cairns	1969–	17.3459°S 145.9126°E	The school relocated to its present site in Boulders Road (south-west corner of Pollard Road) in 1969. In 1983, added secondary schooling to Year 12.
Bentley Park College	Edmonton	Cairns	1998	17.0093°S 145.7400°E	P–12. At McLaughlin Road. Opened in 1998 as a P-7 school called Bentley Park State School. In 1999 it was decided to expand it to incorporate secondary schools, with the middle school opening in 2001 and the first Year 12 students graduating in 2004.
Cairns School of Distance Education	Manunda	Cairns			P–12, distance education
Cairns State High School	Cairns North	Cairns	1924	16.9166°S 145.7680°E	At 156-194 Sheridan Street (corner of Upward Street). Listed on the Queensland Heritage Register.
Cape York AAA – Aurukun	Aurukun	Aurukun			Formerly Aurukun SS until 2002; part of Western Cape until 2012.
Cooktown State School	Cooktown	Cook	1875	15.4820°S 145.2507°E	Prep to Year 12. At 10 Charles Street (corner May Street). Cooktown State School opened on 25 January 1875. On 19 January 1885, it was split into Cooktown Boys State School and Cooktown Girls and Infants State School. In January 1921, the two schools were amalgamated to become Cooktown State School again.
Gordonvale State High School	Gordonvale	Cairns	1965	17.0887°S 145.7783°E	At 85 Sheppards Street.
Herberton State School (Secondary Campus)	Herberton	Tablelands	1912	17.3805°S 145.3825°E	In 1912, Herberton State School was one of the first five schools in Queensland to receive a secondary department, commencing operations on 15 February 1912 with the arrival of the teacher Miss Ramsay B.A. who would teach two languages, English history, mathematics, and science. In 1994, a new primary school campus was established with the secondary department remaining on the original school site in Grace Street.
Innisfail State College	Mighell	Cassowary Coast	1955–2009	17.5367°S 146.0280°E	Opened as Innisfail State High School at 2 Stitt Street.
Innisfail State College	Innisfail Estate	Cassowary Coast	2010-	17.5159°S 146.0369°E	Years 7 to 12 for secondary education. Early Childhood to Year 12 for special education. Replaced Innisfail State High School with additional special education and vocational training. At 45 Flying Fish Point Road .
Kuranda District State College	Kuranda	Mareeba		16.8044°S 145.6174°E	P–12. Replaced Kuranda District State School and Kuranda State High School. At 260 Myola Road.
Lockhart State School	Lockhart River	Lockhart River	1924	12.7854°S 143.3441°E	Early Childhood–12. At Puchewoo Street.
Malanda State High School	Malanda	Tablelands		17.3590°S 145.5934°E	On Memorial Drive.
Mareeba State High School	Mareeba	Mareeba		16.9958°S 145.4163°E	In Jasper Street.
Mossman State High School	Mossman	Douglas		16.4634°S 145.3735°E	At 46–62 Front Street.
Northern Peninsula Area State College – Senior	Bamaga	Northern Peninsula			
Ravenshoe State School (Secondary Campus)	Ravenshoe	Tablelands	1958	17.6105°S 145.4887°E	Prep-12. It has two sites, a primary school campus in 10 Ascham Street and a secondary school campus on the corner of Moore Street and the Kennedy Highway.
Redlynch State College	Redlynch	Cairns	1932-circa 1994		Redlynch State School opened on 15 February 1932 on Intake Road with an initial enrolment of 80 students.
Redlynch State College	Redlynch	Cairns	Circa 1994	16.9092°S 145.6958°E	Circa 1994, the school moved to a new site on a former sugarcane farm, opening with 180 students. In 2007, a secondary school was added to create Redlynch State College. On Jungara Road.
Smithfield State High School	Smithfield	Cairns	1983	16.8119°S 145.6956°E	On O'Brien Road.
Tagai State College – T. I. Secondary Campus	Thursday Island	Torres			Known as Thursday Island State High School until 2007, when it was renamed Tagai State College.
Trinity Bay State High School	Manunda	Cairns	1960	16.9237°S 145.7524°E	At 26–62 Hoare Street.
Tully State High School	Tully	Cassowary Coast		17.9401°S 145.9307°E	At 59337 Bruce Highway.
Western Cape College	Weipa	Weipa			Formerly Weipa North SS until 2002
Woree State High School	Woree	Cairns	1985	16.9602°S 145.7418°E	At Rigg Street.
Yarrabah State School (Secondary Campus)	Yarrabah	Yarrabah		16.9288°S 145.8746°E	The secondary campus (Years 7–10) campus is at Back Beach Road.

=== Other state schools ===
This includes special schools (schools for disabled children) and schools for specific purposes. Additionally to these, special education programs and units are located at many larger primary and high schools.

Name	Suburb	LGA	Opened	Notes
Cairns School of Distance Education	Manunda	Cairns	1974	Next to Trinity Bay State High School

=== Defunct state schools ===
Name	Suburb	LGA	Opened	Closed	Coordinates	Notes
Almaden State School	Almaden	Mareeba	1906	1997	17.3421°S 144.6789°E	Located at 22 Almaden Second Street.
Bamford State School	Bamford, near Petford	Mareeba	1905	1935		
Barrine State School	Barrine	Tablelands	1909	1958	approx 17.2091°S 145.6160°E	Formerly Boar Pocket SS until 1911. It closed in 1958 with the filling of Lake Tinaroo.
Beatrice River State School	Beatrice	Tablelands	1921	1946	17.54276°S 145.60641°E	At 73 Pheasant Road.
Boogan State School	Boogan	Cassowary Coast	1929	1979		
Boonmoo Provisional School	Dimbulah	Mareeba	1910	1912	17.24527°S 145.07642°E	Located on Boonmoo Road, east of the railway station.
Brook's Road State School	Mungalli	Tablelands	c.1927	1958	17.5359°S 145.6725°E	Located at 12 Campbell Road (corner of Brooks Road).
Cairns Central Girls' School	Cairns City	Cairns	1914	1943		Merged into Cairns Central SS
Cairns Central State School	Cairns City	Cairns	1878	1994	16.9192°S 145.7743°E	The school was on the block surrounded by Abbott Street, Alpin Street, Lake Street and Florence Street. The Cairns Special School shared the site.
Cairns North State School	Cairns North	Cairns	1917	2004	16.9021°S 145.7562°E	Located at 381 Sheridan Street.
Cairns Road State School	Atherton	Tablelands	1921	1963	approx 17.27449°S 145.52424°E	Located on Picnic Crossing Road South.
Cairns Special School	Cairns City	Cairns	1958	1990	16.9192°S 145.7744°E	The school was on the same site as the Cairns Central State School, the block surrounded by Abbott Street, Alpin Street, Lake Street and Florence Street.
Calcifer State School	Calcifer, near Chillagoe	Mareeba	c.1898	c.1908		
Cardross State School	Cardross, near Chillagoe	Mareeba	c.1914	c.1920		
Cardstone State School	Cardstone	Cassowary Coast	1959	1990	approx 17.7514°S 145.6094°E	Located within the Cardstone village established for workers at the power plant.
Carrington State School	Carrington	Tablelands	1891	1937		
Cassowary State School	Cassowary	Douglas	1913	1967	16.4881°S 145.3906°E	Located on Captain Cook Highway, now just across the locality boundary in neighbouring Shannonvale.
Castleton State School	via Forsayth	Etheridge	1894	1900		
Charleston State School	Forsayth	Etheridge	1895	1920		Renamed Forsayth State School in 1920
Chilverton State School	Ravenshoe	Tablelands	1916	1956	17.55944°S 145.51721°E	Located at 12280 Kennedy Highway.
Clohesy River State School	near Kuranda	Mareeba	1933	1939		
Coolgarra State School	Coolgarra but now within Mount Garnet	Tablelands	1901	1934	17.56621°S 145.19726°E	The school was on a 3-acre (1.2 ha) site bounded by Mary, Elma, Lucy and Elsie Streets, now within the boundaries of present-day Mount Garnet.
Coorumba State School	Coorumba	Cassowary Coast	1924	1979		
Cowley Lower State School	Lower Cowley	Cassowary Coast	1937	1956	approx 17.69448°S 146.07519°E	Located on the eastern side of Gangemi Road.
Craiglie State School	Craiglie	Douglas	1888	1928		
Croydon King State School	near Croydon	Croydon	1895	1921		
Cumberland State School	Cumberland	Etheridge	1891	1915		
Daradgee State School	Daradgee	Cassowary Coast	1911	1984		
Donnyville State School	via Georgetown	Etheridge	1898	1916		
Dry River Junction State School	near Herberton	Tablelands	c.1911	1918		
East Barron State School	East Barron	Tablelands	1915	1964	17.32364°S 145.53029°E	Located at 331 East Barron Road.
Ebagoolah State School	Ebagoolah	Cook	1905	1914		It opened as Ebagoolah Provisional School in 1905, becoming Ebagoolah State School on 1 January 1909. It closed in 1914.
Einasleigh State School	Einasleigh	Etheridge	1901	1955	18.5101°S 144.0932°E	Located at 5–7 First Street.
Ellinjaa Road State School	Ellinjaa	Tablelands	1919	1949	approx 17.4830°S 145.6577°E	Woolley's Road State School opened on 19 May 1919. In 1923, it was renamed Ellinjaa Road State School. It closed in 1949. It was on the northern corner of Ellinjaa Road and Ellinjar Falls-Theresa Creek Road (approx 17.4808°S 145.6600°E).
Emuford State School	via Petford	Mareeba	1910	1921–1923		
Eubenangee State School	Eubenangee	Cassowary Coast	1921	1971		The locality of Eubenangee is predominantly in the Cairns Region but the town (the most likely location for this former school) is in Cassowary Coast Region.
Euluma Creek State School	Euluma Creek (now Julatten)	Mareeba	1930	1951		
Euramo State School	Euramo	Cassowary Coast	1927	1974	approx 18.0101°S 145.9346°E	The school building was relocated from the closed Japoon West State School in Japoonvale. Located in Euramo on the Bruce Highway.
Evelyn Scrub State School	Evelyn	Tablelands	1896	1946	approx 17.50116°S 145.45370°E	Located near Mill Creek on Jonsson Road.
Evolution State School	near Ravenswood	Charters Towers	1885	1921		Opened in 1885 as Sandy Creek Provisional School. Changed name in 1886 and became a State School in 1909.
Fossilbrook State School	Fossilbrook	Mareeba	1908	1926		It opened as Fossilbrook Provisional School in 1908. On 1 January 1909 it became Fossilbrook State School. There was one temporary closure. It permanently closed due to low attendances in 1926.
Gadgarra State School	Gadgarra (now within Lake Barrine)	Tablelands	1928	1958	17.27156°S 145.65093°E	At 211 Gadgarra Road, now within the locality boundaries of neighbouring Lake Barrine.
Geraldton Road State School	Ravenshoe (now in Evelyn)	Tablelands	1916	1960	17.50658°S 145.50540°E	Geraldton Road State School opened in 1916 via Ravenshoe. It closed in 1960. It was at 45 Geraldton Road (now within the boundaries of neighbouring Evelyn).
Gilbert River State School	Gilbert River	Etheridge	1899	1961		
Gilmore State School	via Chillagoe	Mareeba	1909	1913		The school was probably serving the families working at the Gilmore Mine via Chillagoe. It may initially have been known as Gilmore Siding Provisional School. In 1915 the building was relocated to Mount Mulligan.
Girofla State School	Mungana, near Chillagoe	Mareeba	1898	1946		Later became known as Mungana State School.
Glen Allyn State School	Glen Allyn	Tablelands	1920	1965	approx 17.38471°S 145.66526°E	Located on the western side of Glen Allyn Road.
Golden Gate State School	Golden Gate	Croydon	1896	1921		Golden Gate was a mining township near Croydon.
Goode Island State School	Goods Island	Torres Strait	1903	1912		
Granadilla State School	Granadilla	Cassowary Coast	1937	1941	17.8580°S 146.0285°E	Located on the southern corner of Granadilla Road and Banfield Road
Grass Tree Provisional School	via Cooktown	Cook	1910	1911		Grass Tree Provisional School operated briefly as a half-time school in conjunction with Shipton's Flat Provisional School. No to be confused with a similarly named school near Mackay.
Gregory Educational Facility	Gregory	Burke	?	2012		
Hale's Siding State School	Irvinebank	Mareeba	1915	1922		
Herberton Range State School	Herberton area	Tablelands	1909	1910		
Holloways Beach State School	Holloways Beach	Cairns	1955	1966		
Horse Shoe Bend State School	Ravenshoe	Tablelands	1917	1952	17.59882°S 145.54150°E	Horse Shoe Bend State School (sometimes written as Horseshoe Bend State School) opened in 1917 under head teacher Mary Ellen Duffy. It closed in 1925 due to low student numbers. The school reopened in 1929 and closed on 1 August 1952. It was at 182 Glendinning Road.
Innisfail Inclusive Education Centre	Innisfail	Cassowary Coast	1980	2009		Merged into Innisfail State College
Innisfail State High School	Mighell, Innisfail	Cassowary Coast	1955	2009	17.5367°S 146.0280°E	Merged into Innisfail State College. Located at 2 Stitt Street, Mighell in Innisfail. Innisfail State High School's website was archived.
Iyah State School	Iyah (now Fredericksfield)	Cassowary Coast	1920	1963		
Innot Hot Springs State School	Innot Hot Springs	Tablelands	1940	1957	approx 17.6659°S 145.2386°E	Located at approx 16018 Kennedy Highway.
Jaggan State School	Jaggan	Tablelands	1918	1965		
Jessica Point (Napranum) State School	Napranum	Napranum	1898	2005		Originally opened in 1898 as Weipa Mission School run by the Presbyterian church but was staffed by the Queensland Government not long after. It changed name to Weipa South State School in 1966 and then again to Jessica Point State School in 1976. The name changed again in 2002 to become Napranum Campus of Western Cape College. The school closed in 2005.
Junction Creek State School	Bellenden Ker	Cairns	1898	1902		The present Bellenden Ker State School opened in 1922.
Kaban State School	Kaban	Tablelands	1914	1965?		
Kidston State School	Kidston	Etheridge	1911	1954		
Killaloe State School	Killaloe (but now in Craigslie)	Douglas	1928	1935	approx 16.51096°S 145.44257°E	The school was on the northern corner of the Captain Cook Highway and Mcclellan Road in present-day Craiglie.
Kingsborough State School	Kingsborough	Mareeba	1882	1924		
Koah State School	Koah	Mareeba	1933	1938?		No mentions of this school in the Trove newspapers after 1938
Koombooloomba State School	Koombooloomba	Tablelands	1953	1963		
Koorboora State School	Koorboora (now Petford)	Mareeba	c.1901	c.1936		
Kulara State School	Kulara (now Barrine)	Tablelands	1912	1958	17.24420°S 145.58306°E	The town of Kulara was inundated with the filling of Tinaroo Dam in 1959. However, being on higher ground, the school building was not flooded and is now a private residence at 85 Backshall Road, Barrine.
Kuranda State High School	Kuranda	Mareeba	1998	2007	16.8044°S 145.6174°E	Kuranda State High School opened on 22 January 1998 at 260 Myola Road in Myola. In 2007, Kuranda District State School and Kuranda State High School amalgamated to form Kuranda District State College, by expanding the Kuranda State High School site at Myola. Kuranda State High School's website was archived.
Kuranda District State School	Kuranda	Mareeba	1892	2007	16.8218°S 145.6396°E	Opened in 1892 as Kuranda State School, renamed in 2002 as Kuranda District State School. Located at 14–22 Arara Street. In 2007, it was amalgamated with Kuranda District State High School to create Kuranda District State College. Kuranda District State School's website was archived.
Kureen State School	Kureen	Tablelands	1912	1958	approx 17.3323°S 145.5944°E	Located on the eastern side of Peeramon Road.
Lake Barrine State School	Lake Barrine	Tablelands	1922	1949	17.24382°S 145.64108°E	At 3426 Gillies Range Road.
Lancelot State School	in north-western Silver Valley	Tablelands	1905	1926	17.45170°S 145.28883°E	Lancelot Provisional School opened in 1905 but closed in 1906 when insufficient students enrolled. It reopened circa 1920 and closed in 1926. It was on 2-acre (0.81 ha) site on the eastern side of Silver Valley Road.
Lappa Lappa State School	Lappa Lappa, near Petford	Mareeba	1900	1902		
Lever Estate State School	Walter Lever Estate	Cassowary Coast	1936	1967	17.73028°N 145.97258°E	At 410 Walter Lever Estate Road.
Limestone State School	Groganville	Mareeba	1890	1905		Groganville was formerly known as Limestone.
Little Mulgrave State School	Little Mulgrave	Cairns	1926	1964		
Lorraine State School	Lorraine Station in Stokes	Carpentaria	1981	1995		
Lower Nettles Provisional School	Innot Hot Springs	Tablelands	1911	1916		Lower Nettles opened as a provisional school in about July 1911. In July 1916, it became a half time school in conjunction with Coolgarra State School. However, later in 1916, Lower Nettles was closed and Coolgarra reverted to full-time status.
Maytown State School	Maytown (now in Palmer)	Cook	circa 1877	1925	approx 16.0497°S 144.2878°E	Maytown State School opened circa 1877 in Maytown and closed in 1917. It reopened briefly in 1924, closing in 1925. Coordinates are for the town generally.
McIvor River Provisional School	via Hope Vale	Cook	1960	early 1961		
Merragallan State School	Merragallan (now Jaggan)	Tablelands	1913	1935		
Middlebrook Road State School	Middlebrook	Tablelands	1935	1945	approx 17.56298°S 145.64042°E	Located on the eastern corner of Middlebrook Road and Barter Road.
Midgenoo State School	Midgenoo	Cassowary Coast	1923	1933		
Minbun State School	Minbun	Tablelands	1922	1974	17.47854°S 145.58027°E	Opened 1922 as Nash Road State School, renamed 1925 Minbun State School. Located on the north-eastern corner or Nash Road and Millaa Millaa – Malanda Road.
Montalbion State School	Montalbion (now in Irvinebank)	Tablelands	1888	1906		Montalbion is a former mining town at 17.4006°S 145.1504°E.
Moregatta State School	Moregatta	Tablelands	1927	1948	17.48438°S 145.59856°E	Located at 323 Moregatta Road.
Moresby State School	Moresby	Cassowary Coast	1915	2014	17.63466°S 146.02829°E	Located at 2–20 Moresby Road. The school's website was archived.
Mount Amos State School	Mount Amos (now Rossville)	Cook	1918	1919		
Mount Aunt State School	Mount Aunt (now in Chewko)	Mareeba	1940	1958		
Mount Carbine State School	Mount Carbine	Mareeba	1908	1957	approx 16.5302°S 145.1321°E	Located on the western side of Pump Road.
Mount Jackson State School	via Georgetown	Etheridge	1918	1922		
Mount Mulligan State School	Mount Mulligan	Mareeba	1915	1958		The school building was relocated from the closed Gilmore State School in 1915.
Mowbray River State School	Mowbray	Douglas	1925	1961	16.56561°S 145.46745°E	Located at 264 Mowbray River Road.The school building is still on the site, forming part of a house.
Muldiva State School	Muldiva, near Chillagoe	Mareeba	c.1892	c.1894		
Mungana State School	Mungana, near Chillagoe	Mareeba	1898	1946		Originally known as Girofla State School.
Northcote State School	via Dimbulah	Mareeba	1883	c.1910		
North East Harbour Line State School	New Harbourline	Cassowary Coast	1936	1941	approx 17.6139°S 146.0611°E	Located on the northern side of New Harbourline Road.
North Johnstone State School	North Johnstone	Tablelands	1914	1971		
Nymbool State School	Mount Garnet	Tablelands	1904	c.1937		
O.K. State School	Ok mining settlement (now in Chillagoe)	Mareeba	1904	1910		
Palmerston East State School	East Palmerston	Cassowary Coast	1938	2012	17.6033°S 145.8467°E	Sometimes known as East Palmerston State School. It was located at 2068 Palmerston Highway East. The school's website was archived.
Peeramon State School	Peeramon	Tablelands	1911	1959	17.3099°S 145.6239°E	Opened in 1911 as Lake Eacham State School, renamed Peeramon State School in 1919. It was at 107 Mckenzie Road (corner Peeramon School Road).
Percyville State School	via Kidston	Etheridge	c.1910	1921?		
Petford State School	Petford	Mareeba	1935	1995	17.3407°S 144.9299°E	Located at 21 Bamford Road.
Port Douglas State School	Port Douglas	Douglas	1879	1962		
Redcap State School	Redcap, near Chillagoe	Mareeba	1905	c.1908		
Riversdale State School	Euramo	Cassowary Coast	1953	1968	17.9956°S 145.8602°E	Riversdale is now in Euramo. Located at approx 917 Davidson Road.
Rocky Bluffs State School	near Irvinebank	Mareeba	1904	1910		
Rocky Point State School	Rocky Point	Douglas	1939	1999	16.3874°S 145.4176°E	Located at 14 Rocky Point School Road. In 1999, the school was replaced by the Wonga Beach State School.
Shiptons Flat State School	via Cooktown	Cook	1910	1921		
Silky Oak Creek State School	Silky Oak	Cassowary Coast	1940	1974	17.98160°S 145.94591°E	Located at 254 Jack Evans Drive.
Smithfield State School	Smithfield	Cairns	1899	1964		
Stannary Hills State School	Stannary Hills (now in the north-east of Irvinebank)	Tablelands	1904	circa 1931	approx 17.3169°S 145.2173°E	The town of Stannary Hills is now abandoned.
Strathmore State School	Strathmore	Mareeba/Etheridge	1916	1932		
Stratvell State School	Japoonvale	Cassowary Coast	1916	2002	17.7239°S 145.9221°E	Located at 34 Stratvell Road.
Sunnymount State School	Petford	Mareeba	1913	1924		
Tableland State School			1904	1919		There was a Tableland State School in Tablelands, Gladstone Region.
Tabletop State School	near Croydon	Croydon	circa 1888	1910		Opened as Tabletop Provisional School circa 1888, becoming Tabletop State School on 1 January 1909, then closing in 1910. Is different to Table Top State School on the Darling Downs.
Tarzali State School	Tarzali	Tablelands	1914	1967		
Tate Tin Mines State School	near Almaden	Mareeba	1894	1940		Provisional school until 1909. Closed in 1924 then opened again in 1930 before closing permanently in 1940.
Tinaroo Falls State School	Tinaroo	Tablelands	1954	1959		
Thornborough State School	Thornborough	Mareeba	1878	1932		
Topaz State School	Topaz	Tablelands	1932	1960	17.42344°S 145.71793°E	At 3 Union Street. The school building was converted into a house and was still extant in May 2023.
Trevethan Creek State School	via Cooktown	Cook	1915	1919		
True Blue State School	near Croydon	Croydon	1893	1913		Needs further research as there is some evidence at Qld State Archives that this school was open between 1975 and 1977.
Tully Falls State School	via Ravenshoe	Tablelands	1953	1955		
Tumoulin State School	Tumoulin	Tablelands	1912	1960		
Upper Barron State School	Upper Barron	Tablelands	1911	2008	17.3827°S 145.5145°E	Located at 9570 Kennedy Highway. The school's website was archived.
Vine Creek State School	Ravenshoe	Tablelands	1936	1945	17.6658°S 145.50770°E	Located at 620 Tully Falls Road.
Wai-Ben State School	Thursday Island, Torres Strait	Torres	1940	c1963		Originally known as Thursday Island State School for Coloured Children. Renamed in 1954.
Watsonville State School	Watsonville	Mareeba	1882	c.1943	17.3790°S 145.3148°E	Located on the block surrounded by Ann, Mary, Ethel and Edith Streets.
Wattleglen State School	near Craiglie	Douglas	1874	1948		This school opened and closed many times and changed name each time. It originally opened in 1874 as Goganjo State School, closed in 1878, then reopened in 1882 as Warralie State School for three years. It opened again in 1888 as Craiglie State School, closing again in 1928 before opening again under the final name in 1939.
Wirra Wirra State School	Forsayth	Etheridge	1914	circa 1918	18.61770°S 143.76653°E	Located on a 3-acre (1.2 ha) land parcel on Wirra Wirra Road near the Wirra Wirra railway station.
Wolfram State School	Wolfram, near Chillagoe	Mareeba	1905	1940		
Wondecla State School	Wondecla	Tablelands	1883	1958	17.4145°S 145.3933°E	Opened 1883 as Nigger Creek Provisional School, renamed 1922 Wondecla State School. Located on a 5-acre-8-perch (2.04 ha) site on the western side of Longlands Gap Road immediately south of Wondecla Creek.
Woodville State School	via Dimbulah, Hodgkinson River area	Mareeba	1893	c.1933		There was also a Woodville State School near Yaamba, Shire of Livingstone.
Woopen Creek State School	Woopen Creek	Cairns	1952	1967		
Wright's Creek State School	Wrights Creek	Cairns	1894	1953		
Yandina Creek State School	near Croydon	Croydon	1918	1964		Originally known as Golden Valley State School, then in 1914 changed name to Valdora State School before becoming Yandina Creek in 1948. Note this is different to another school elsewhere in Queensland called Yandina Creek State School which operated between 1914 and 1920 and 1932–1941.
Yarraden State School	Yarraden	Cook	Jan 1907	Dec 1907		
Zillmanton State School	Zillmanton, near Chillagoe	Mareeba	1909	c.1914		

== Private schools ==
=== Catholic schools ===
Catholic schools in the Cairns region are administered by Catholic Education Office, Roman Catholic Diocese of Cairns, and supported by the Queensland Catholic Education Commission, which is responsible for coordinating administration, curriculum and policy across the Catholic school system. Preference for enrolment is given to Catholic students from the parish or local area, although non-Catholic students are admitted if room is available.

Name	Suburb	LGA	M/F/Co-ed	Years	Opened	Coordinates	Notes
Good Counsel College	Innisfail	Cassowary Coast	Co-ed	7–12	1975	17.5207°S 146.0285°E	At 66 Owen Street.
Good Counsel Primary School	Innisfail	Cassowary Coast	Co-ed	P–6	1975	17.5212°S 146.0288°E	At 96 Rankin Street.
Holy Cross Primary School	Trinity Park	Cairns	Co-ed	P–6	1987	16.8102°S 145.6953°E	At 191-201 Reed Road.
Holy Spirit College	Cooktown	Cook	Co-ed	7–12	2015	15.4825°S 145.2484°E	Alternative, for disengaged young people. At 1 Burkitt Street (corner of Hope Street).
Holy Spirit College	Manoora and Edmonton	Cairns	Co-ed		2015		Alternative, for disengaged young people
Mackillop Catholic College	Mount Peter	Cairns	Co-ed	P–12	2016	17.0403°S 145.7404°E	At 1 Mackillop Road (corner of Mt Peter Road).
Mother of Good Counsel School	Cairns North	Cairns	Co-ed	P–6	1936	16.8994°S 145.7562°E	At 394 Sheridan Street.
Mount St Bernard College	Herberton	Tablelands	Co-ed	7–12	1921	17.3793°S 145.3826°E	At 15 Broadway Street.
Newman Catholic College	Smithfield	Cairns	Co-ed	7–12	2022	16.8182°S 145.6923°E	On the Cairns campus of James Cook University in Smithfield. The school opened its Year 7 enrolments in 2022 and by 2027 will be offering the full range of Years 7–12.
Our Lady Help of Christians School	Earlville	Cairns	Co-ed	P–6	1964	16.9430°S 145.7371°E	At 18 Balaclava Road.
Our Lady of the Sacred Heart School	Thursday Island and Hammond Island	Torres	Co-ed	P–6	1886		
St Andrews Catholic College	Redlynch	Cairns	Co-ed	P–12	2001	16.9040°S 145.6992°E	At 185-205 Intake Road.
St Anthony's Primary School	Dimbulah	Mareeba	Co-ed	P–6	1966	17.1473°S 145.1118°E	At 3 Hyde Street.
St Augustine's College	Parramatta Park	Cairns	M	7–12	1930	16.9263°S 145.7681°E	At 251 Draper Street.
St Augustine's School	Mossman	Douglas	Co-ed	P–6	1934	16.4617°S 145.3688°E	In Grogan Street.
St Clare's School	Tully	Cassowary Coast	Co-ed	P–6	1928	17.9371°S 145.9206°E	At 13 Mars Street.
St Francis Xavier's School	Manunda	Cairns	Co-ed	P–6	1967	16.9238°S 145.7409°E	At 5 Atkinson Street.
St Gerard Majella School	Woree	Cairns	Co-ed	P–6	1988	16.9675°S 145.7403°E	At 63 Anderson Road.
St John's Catholic School	Silkwood	Cassowary Coast	Co-ed	P–6	1948	17.7372°S 146.0051°E	In Harold Street.
St Joseph's School	Atherton	Tablelands	Co-ed	P–6	1923	17.26554°S 145.47864°E	On the south-west corner of Jack & Alice Streets.
St Joseph's School	Parramatta Park	Cairns	Co-ed	P–6	1927	16.9265°S 145.7665°E	At 13 Loeven Street.
St Joseph's School	Rocky Point	Weipa	Co-ed	P–6	2016	12.6293°S 141.8802°E	At 2 Boundary Road.
St Mary's College	Woree	Cairns	Co-ed	7–12	1986		
St Michael's Catholic Primary School	Gordonvale	Cairns	Co-ed	P–6	1923	17.0955°S 145.7873°E	58 Mill Street.
St Monica's Catholic College	Cairns City	Cairns	F	7–12	1890		
St Rita's School	Babinda	Cairns	Co-ed	P–6	1926	17.3430°S 145.9225°E	At 7–13 Church Street.
St Rita's School	South Johnstone	Cassowary Coast	Co-ed	P–6	1932	17.5988°S 145.9963°E	At 8 Green Street.
St Stephen's Catholic College	Mareeba	Mareeba	Co-ed	7–12	2006	17.0176°S 145.4198°E	At 3 McIver Road.
St Teresa's Primary School	Ravenshoe	Tablelands	Co-ed	P–6	1950	17.6113°S 145.4870°E	At 6 Moffatt Street.
St Therese's School	Edmonton	Cairns	Co-ed	P–6	1929		Opened as Edmonton Catholic School, renamed St Therese's School in 1965, relocated to Bentley Park in 1995.
St Therese's School	Bentley Park	Cairns	Co-ed	P–6	1995	17.0064°S 145.7312°E	At 135 Robert Road.
St Thomas's School	Mareeba	Mareeba	Co-ed	P–6	1909	16.9952°S 145.4254°E	At 63 Constance Street.

=== Independent schools ===
Name	Suburb	LGA	M/F/Co-ed	Years	Category	Opened	Coordinates	Notes
Autism Queensland Education & Therapy Centre	Edmonton	Cairns	Co-ed		Independent			Special School, Operated by Autism Queensland
Cairns Adventist College	Gordonvale	Cairns	Co-ed	P–6	Adventist	1950	17.0760°S 145.7923°E	At 42 Crossland Road.
Cairns Hinterland Steiner School	Kuranda	Mareeba	Co-ed	P–12	Steiner	2002		Formerly Candlenut Steiner School, formerly Cairns Steiner School.
Djarragun College	Gordonvale	Cairns	Co-ed	P–12	Anglican	2001	17.0799°S 145.7763°E	Formerly Emmanuel College, Manunda. At 1 Maher Road.
Djarragun College	Port Douglas	Douglas	Co-ed	P–12	Anglican	2008		Formerly Wangetti Education Centre.
Endeavour Christian College	Cooktown	Cook	Co-ed	P–12	Christian	2012	15.4822°S 145.2549°E	At 12 Charles Street.
Freshwater Christian College	Brinsmead	Cairns	Co-ed	P–12	Christian	1983	16.8925°S 145.7082°E	At 369–401 Brinsmead Road.
Gulf Christian College	Normanton	Carpentaria	Co-ed	P–12	Christian	1990	17.6709°S 141.0798°E	At 24–30 Brown Street.
Jubilee Christian College	Atherton	Tablelands	Co-ed	P–12	Christian	1984	17.27494°S 145.47945°E	Formerly Tableland Christian College until 1998. Prep–12, at 52 Grau Street.
Kluthuthu Christian College	Napranum	Napranum	Co-ed	P–7	Christian	2023		
Mastery Schools Australia	Cairns City	Cairns	Co-ed	4–10	Alternative	2021		
Peace Lutheran College	Kamerunga	Cairns	Co-ed	P–12	Lutheran	1994		
Radiant Life College	East Innisfail	Cassowary Coast	Co-ed	P–10	Christian	1982	17.5395°S 146.0348°E	Prep to Year 7. At 1–5 Riley Street. Primarily targeting Indigenous students.
Silver Lining School	Mooroobool	Cairns	Co-ed		Aboriginal			
The BUSY School	Cairns City	Cairns	Co-ed	11–12	Alternative			
The Rainforest School	Maria Creeks	Cassowary Coast	Co-ed	P–6	Independent	2019		
Trinity Anglican School	Kewarra Beach	Cairns	Co-ed	K–6	Anglican		16.7888°S 145.6829°E	At 45 Poolwood Road.
Trinity Anglican School	White Rock	Cairns	Co-ed	K–12	Anglican	1983	16.9788°S 145.7448°E	At 4-54 Sheehy Road.

=== Defunct private schools ===
Name	Suburb	LGA	Category	Opened	Closed	Notes
Darlingia Forest School	East Innisfail	Cassowary Coast	Democratic	2021	2023	Prep-Year 4.
Emmanuel College	Manunda	Cairns	Anglican	1986	2001	Became Djarragun College
Sacred Heart Girls School	Innisfail	Cassowary Coast	Catholic	1903	1975	Merged into Good Counsel College
St Barnabas' Anglican School	Ravenshoe	Tablelands	Anglican	1953	1990	Campus acquired by Ravenshoe SS
St Mary's School	Herberton	Tablelands	Anglican	1918	1965	
Wangetti Education Centre	Port Douglas	Douglas	Anglican	1983	2008	Became campus of Djarragun College

== See also ==
- List of schools in Queensland
