= Catholic Education Cairns =

Catholic Education in the Diocese of Cairns, Australia, educates over 11,200 students from north in the Torres Strait, west to the Atherton Tablelands, and as far as Tully in the South. There are 29 Catholic Schools in the Diocese, including primary, secondary, college and boarding.

The Catholic Education Services office is located in Cairns, on the corner of Lake and Minnie Street, and takes all enquires for the Diocese.

== List of schools and colleges ==
Name	Suburb	Opened	Website	Notes
Good Counsel College	Innisfail	1975	Website	Year 7 – 12 Co-Educational Day Schooling
Good Counsel Primary School	Innisfail	1975	Website	Prep – Year 6
Holy Cross Primary School	Trinity Park, Cairns	1987	Website	Prep – Year 6 OSHCare
Holy Spirit College Cooktown	Cooktown	2015	Website	The focus of this college is the provision of education for disengaged young people which guides their spiritual, social, emotional, academic, and physical development through an engaging and individualised curriculum.
Holy Spirit College Manoora	Manoora, Cairns	2015	Website	The focus of this college is the provision of education for disengaged young people which guides their spiritual, social, emotional, academic, and physical development through an engaging and individualised curriculum.
Mackillop Catholic College	Mount Peter, Cairns	2016	Website	Prep – Year 12 (Prep to Year 4 in 2017) Co-Educational Day Schooling
Mother of Good Counsel School	North Cairns	1936	Website	Prep – Year 6 OSHCare
Mount St Bernard College	Herberton	1921	Website	Year 7 – 12 Co-Educational Day Schooling and Boarding
Our Lady Help of Christians School	Earlville, Cairns	1964	Website	Prep – Year 6 OSHCare
Our Lady of the Sacred Heart School	Thursday Island and Hammond Island	1886	Website	Thursday Island Campus, Prep – Year 6 Hammond Island Campus, Prep – Year 3
St Andrews Catholic College	Redlynch, Cairns	2001	Website	Prep – Year 12 Co-Educational Day Schooling OSHCare
St Anthony's Primary School	Dimbulah	1966	Website	Prep – Year 6
St Augustine's College	Cairns City	1930	Website	Year 7 – 12 Boys Only Day Schooling Boarding
St Augustine's School	Mossman	1934	Website	Prep – Year 6 OSHCare
St Clare's School	Tully	1928	Website	Prep – Year 6
St Francis Xavier's School	Manunda, Cairns	1967	Website	Prep – Year 6 OSHCare
St Gerard Majella School	Woree, Cairns	1988	Website	Prep – Year 6 OSHCare
St John's Catholic School	Silkwood	1948	Website	Prep – Year 6
St Joseph's School	Atherton	1923	Website	Prep – Year 6
St Joseph's School	Parramatta Park, Cairns	1927	Website	Prep – Year 6 OSHCare
St Joseph's School	Weipa	2016	Website	Prep – Year 6
St Mary's College	Woree, Cairns	1986	Website	Year 7 – 12 Secondary Co-Educational Day Schooling
St Michael's School	Gordonvale	1923	Website	Prep – Year 6 OSHCare
St Monica's Catholic College	Cairns City	1890	Website	Year 7 – 12 Girls Only Day Schooling/ Boarding
St Rita's School	Babinda	1926	Website	Prep – Year 6
St Rita's School	South Johnstone	1932	Website	Prep – Year 6
St Stephen's Catholic College	Mareeba	2006	Website	Year 7 – 12 Co-Educational Day Schooling
St Teresa's Primary School	Ravenshoe	1950	Website	Prep – Year 6
St Therese's School	Bentley Park, Cairns	1929	Website	Prep – Year 6 OSHCare
St Thomas's School	Mareeba	1909	Website	Prep – Year 6

== See also ==
List of schools in Far North Queensland
