= Bayview Heights, Queensland =

Bayview Heights
- Suburb
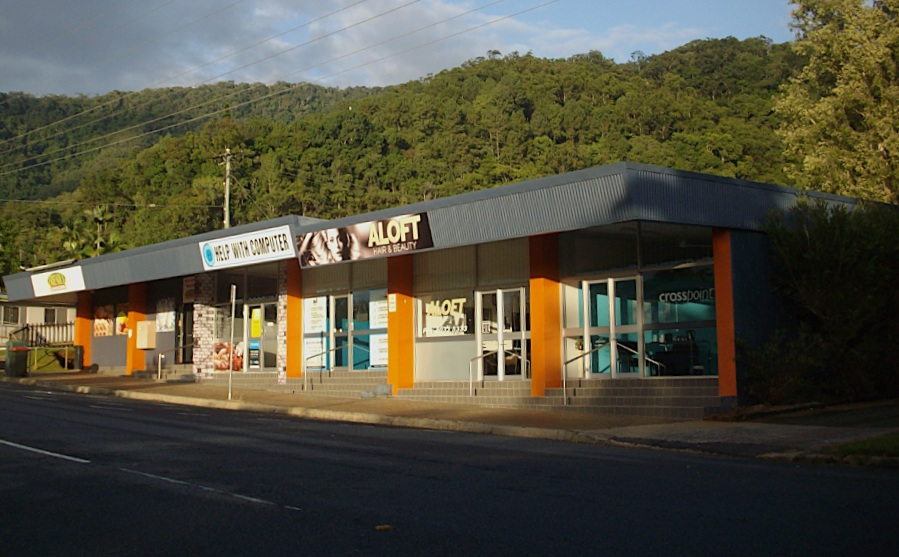
- Marti Street, Bayview Heights

- Interactive map of Bayview Heights
- Coordinates: 16.963°S 145.730°E
- Country: Australia
- State: Queensland
- LGA: Cairns Region
- Location: 7.4 km (4.6 mi) SW of Cairns CBD; 344 km (214 mi) NNW of Townsville; 1,702 km (1,058 mi) NNW of Brisbane

Government
  - State electorate: Mulgrave
  - Federal division: Leichhardt

Area
  - Total: 4.3 km^{2} (1.7 sq mi)
- Elevation: 20 to 360 m (66 to 1,181 ft)

Population
  - Total: 4,175 (2021 census)
  - Density: 971/km^{2} (2,515/sq mi)
- Postcode: 4868
Suburbs around Bayview Heights
Lamb Range	Earlville	Woree
Lamb Range	Bayview Heights	Woree
Lamb Range	Mount Sheridan	Woree

Bayview Heights is a southern suburb of Cairns in the Cairns Region, Queensland, Australia. In the 2021 census, Bayview Heights had a population of 4,175 people.

== Geography ==
The suburb is on the outskirts of the developed area of Cairns with the west and south of the suburb remaining undeveloped. The elevation of the suburb varies considerably from approx 20 to 360 metres (66 to 1,181 ft) from the north-east corner of the suburb to the south-west corner towards the Whitfield Range. The land use is suburban residences.

== History ==
Bayview Heights is situated in the Yidinji traditional Aboriginal country. The area was aptly named Bayview in 1947 based on views of the sea. The area was officially became a locality called Bayview Heights in April 1970, becoming a suburb in June 2002.

== Demographics ==
In the 2011 census, Bayview Heights had a population of 4,150 people.

In the 2016 census, Bayview Heights had a population of 4,238 people.

In the 2021 census, Bayview Heights had a population of 4,175 people.

== Education ==
There are no schools in Bayview Heights. The nearest government primary and secondary schools are Woree State School and Woree State High School, both in the neighbouring suburb of Woree to the west.

== Amenities ==
There are a number of parks in the area (from north to south):

- Cantoni Park (16.9563°S 145.7344°E)
- Dandaloo Street Park (16.9569°S 145.7306°E)
- Forno Park (16.9635°S 145.7294°E)
