= Mount Sheridan, Queensland =

Mount Sheridan Cairns, Queensland
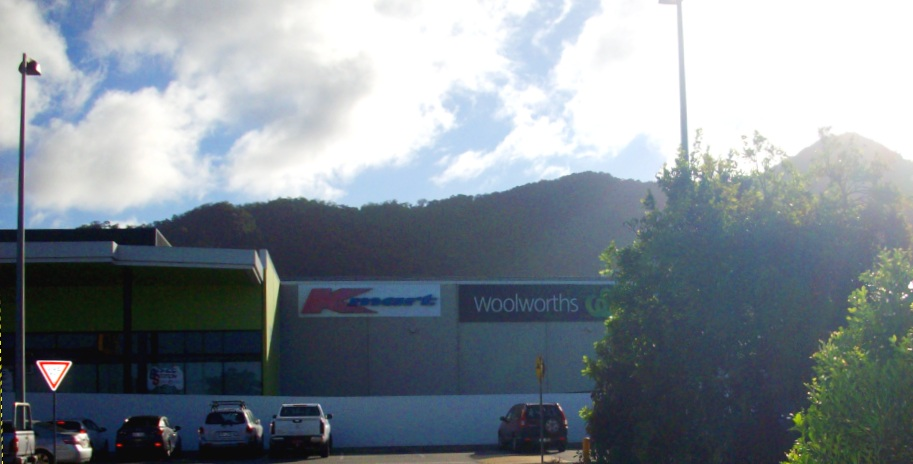
- Mount Sheridan Plaza shopping centre

- Coordinates: 16.9838°S 145.7288°E
- Population: 8,678 (2021 census)
  - Density: 1,295/km^{2} (3,355/sq mi)
- Postcode(s): 4868
- Area: 6.7 km^{2} (2.6 sq mi)
- Time zone: AEST (UTC+10:00)
- Location: 10.0 km (6 mi) SW of Cairns CBD; 338 km (210 mi) NNW of Townsville; 1,669 km (1,037 mi) NNW of Brisbane
- LGA(s): Cairns Region
- State electorate(s): Mulgrave
- Federal division(s): Kennedy; Leichhardt
Suburbs around Mount Sheridan:
| Lamb Range | Bayview Heights | Woree |
| Lamb Range | Mount Sheridan | White Rock |
| Bentley Park | Bentley Park | Edmonton |

Mount Sheridan is a suburb of Cairns in the Cairns Region, Queensland, Australia. In the 2021 census, Mount Sheridan had a population of 8,678 people.

== Geography ==
The Bruce Highway and the North Coast railway line immediately to its east form the eastern boundary of the suburb.

== History ==
Mount Sheridan is situated in the Yidinji traditional Aboriginal country.

The suburb takes its name from the mountain of the same name, which is not located within the suburb but to the west in Lamb Range.

== Demographics ==
In the 2016 census, Mount Sheridan had a population of 8,271 people.

In the 2021 census, Mount Sheridan had a population of 8,678 people.

== Education ==
There are no schools in Mount Sheridan. The nearest government primary schools are White Rock State School in neighbouring White Rock to the east, Bentley Park College in neighbouring Bentley Park to the south, and Woree State School in neighbouring Woree to the north. The nearest government secondary schools are Bentley Park College in Bentley Park and Woree State High School in Woree.

== Facilities ==
Forest View Cemetery is at 65-77 Foster Road (16.9880°S 145.7347°E). Cairns Crematorium is adjacent at 79-85 Foster Road (16.9875°S 145.7343°E).

== Amenities ==
Shopping centres in the suburb include:

- Mount Sheridan Plaza, 106 Barnard Drive (16.9901°S 145.7402°E)
- Forest Gardens Shopping Village, 121-127 Benjamina Street (16.9781°S 145.7404°E)

There are a number of parks in the area, including:

- Forest Gardens Boulevard (16.9776°S 145.7421°E)
- Foxtail Street Park (16.9766°S 145.7399°E)
- George Cannon Drive Park
- Tom Murray Park
