= Portsmith =

Portsmith Cairns, Queensland
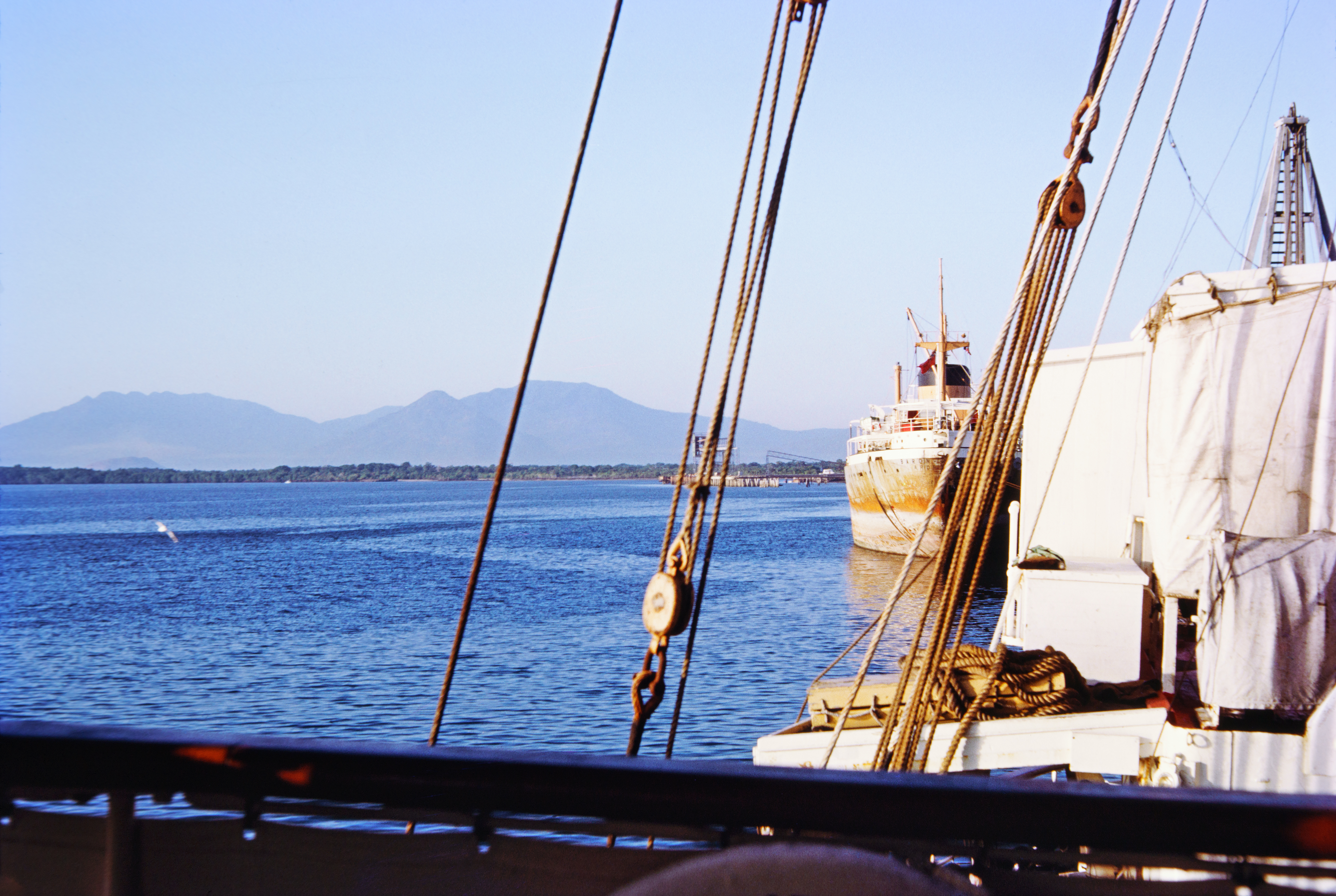
- View from the Bulk Sugar Terminal across Trinity Inlet, 1964

- Coordinates: 16.945°S 145.7666°E
- Population: 314 (2021 census)
  - Density: 20.13/km^{2} (52.13/sq mi)
- Postcode(s): 4870
- Area: 15.6 km^{2} (6.0 sq mi)
- Time zone: AEST (UTC+10:00)
- Location: 3.4 km (2 mi) S of Cairns CBD; 1,684 km (1,046 mi) NNW of Brisbane
- LGA(s): Cairns Region
- State electorate(s): Cairns; Mulgrave
- Federal division(s): Leichhardt; Kennedy
Suburbs around Portsmith:
Bungalow	Parramatta Park	Cairns City
Woree	Portsmith	East Trinity
White Rock	Edmonton	Wrights Creek

Portsmith is a suburb of Cairns in the Cairns Region, Queensland, Australia. In the 2021 census, Portsmith had a population of 314 people.

== Geography ==
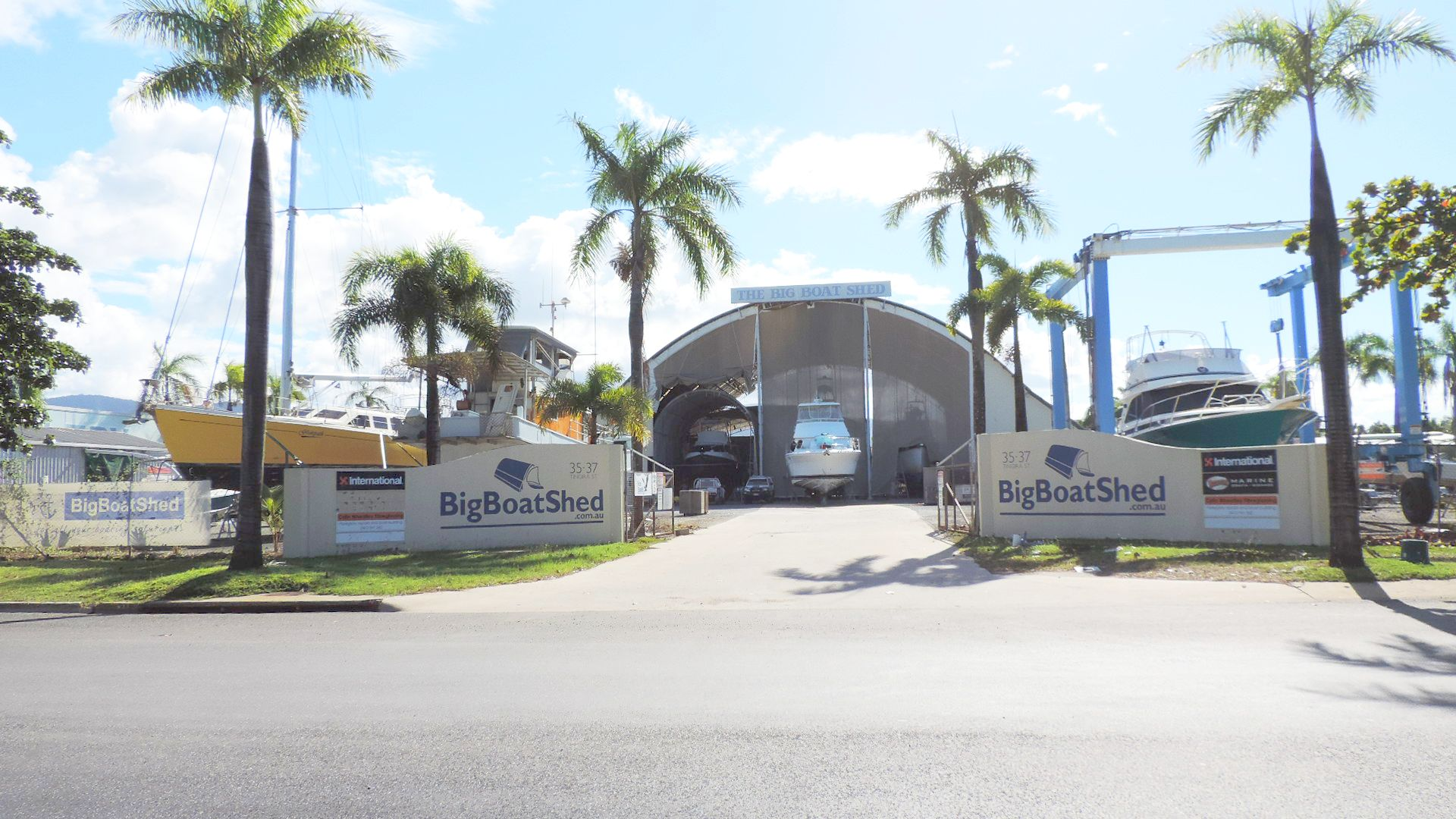
The Big Boat Shed, 2018

The suburb consists of two distinct areas: the north-western part which is the mainland (adjacent with suburbs Woree, Bungalow, Parramatta Park and Cairns City) and the south-eastern part which is a pair of islands (Admiralty Island and a smaller unnamed island) bounded to the west by Smiths Creek and to the east by Trinity Inlet. The mainland part is developed land while the islands are undeveloped. The entire suburb is flat low-lying land, less than 10 metres above sea level.

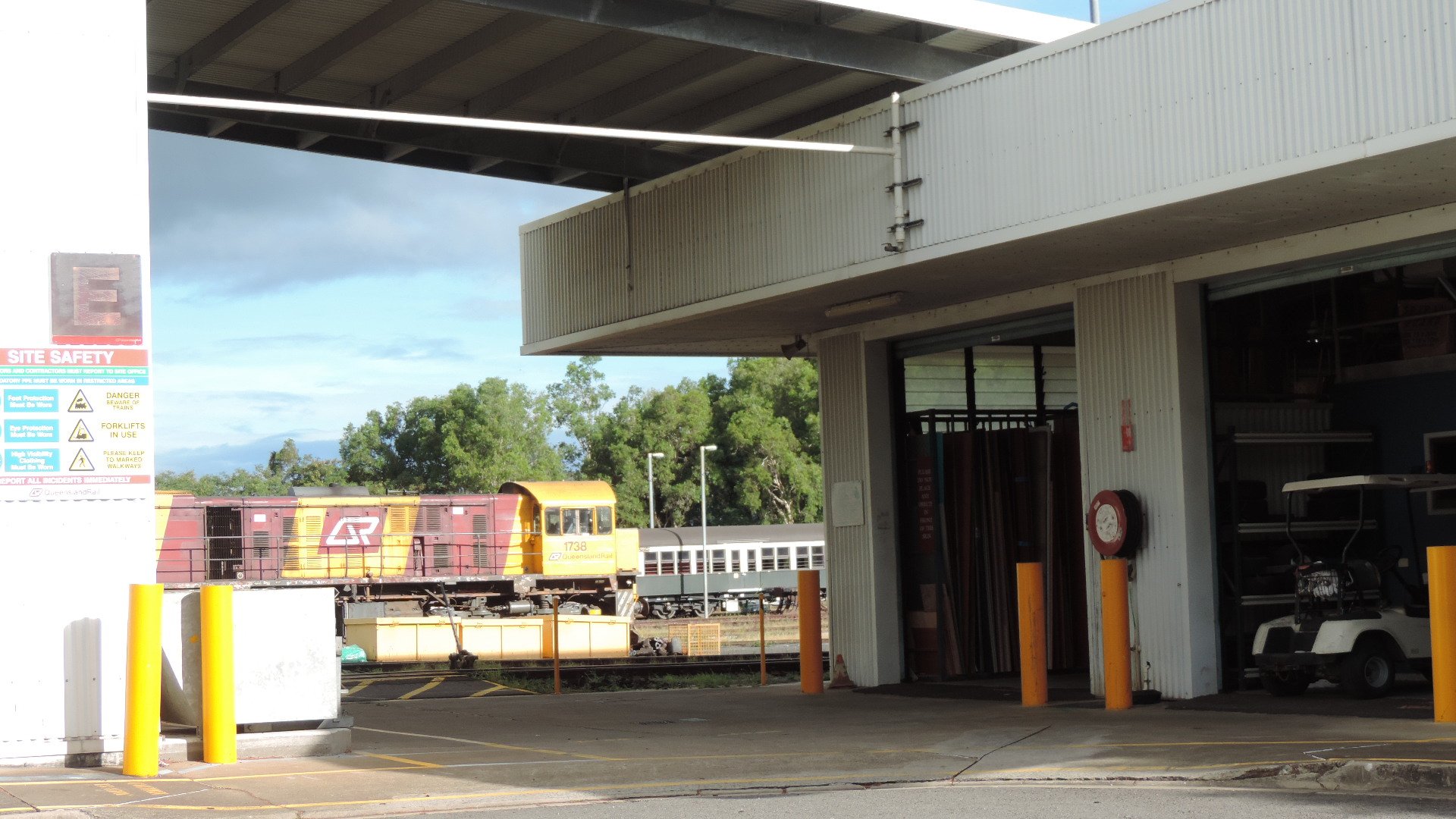
Portsmith railway yards, 2018

The mainland part is principally used for industrial purposes with those nearest Smiths Creek being used for maritime purposes such as boat building, shipping services, trawlers and fish markets.

Ray Jones Drive/Bruce Highway is an arterial road that runs from the south-west to the north-east through the mainland area (being known at the north-east end as Comport Street). The North Coast railway line runs south and roughly parallel with the arterial road with the Portsmith railway station (16.9461°S 145.7641°E) and Portsmith railway yards serving the suburb.

== History ==
Portsmith is situated in the Yidinji traditional Aboriginal country. The origin of the suburb name is from an early pioneer named William Smith.

== Demographics ==
In the 2016 census, Portsmith had a population of 260 people.

In the 2021 census, Portsmith had a population of 314 people.

== Education ==
There are no schools in Portsmith. The nearest government primary schools are Parramatta State School in neighbouring Parramatta Park to the north and Balaclava State School in Mooroobool to the north-west. The nearest government secondary school is Trinity Bay State High School in Manunda to the north.

Great Barrier Reef International Marine College is a technical college specialising in maritime training. It is at 55-61 Tingira Street (16.9491°S 145.7699°E). It has a training ship in addition to a number of simulators, engineering workshops, and an immersion pool.

== Amenities ==
There is a boat ramp, floating walkway and pontoon at Tingira Street into Smiths Creek (16.9526°S 145.7729°E). It is managed by the Cairns Regional Council.

There is a boat ramp and floating walkway at Fearnley Street into Trinity Inlet (16.9413°S 145.7754°E). It is managed by the Cairns Regional Council.
