= White Rock, Queensland (Cairns Region) =

White Rock
- Suburb
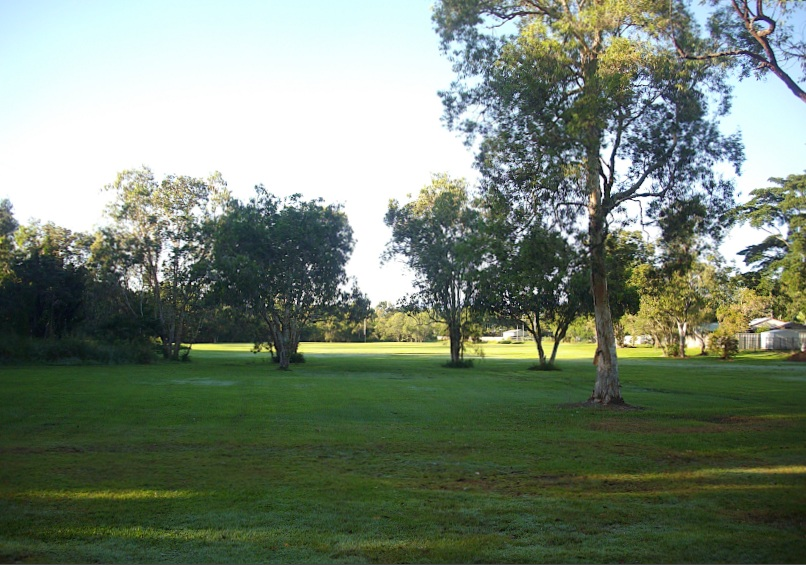
- Minniecon/Mundi Gunjii Park

- Interactive map of White Rock
- Coordinates: 16.9794°S 145.7569°E
- Country: Australia
- State: Queensland
- City: Cairns
- LGA: Cairns Region
- Location: 9.1 km (5.7 mi) SW of Cairns CBD; 339 km (211 mi) NNW of Townsville; 1,671 km (1,038 mi) NNW of Brisbane

Government
  - State electorate: Mulgrave
  - Federal division: Leichhardt

Area
  - Total: 9.5 km^{2} (3.7 sq mi)

Population
  - Total: 4,918 (2021 census)
  - Density: 517.7/km^{2} (1,341/sq mi)
- Time zone: UTC+10:00 (AEST)
- Postcode: 4868
Suburbs around White Rock
Woree	Woree	Portsmith
Mount Sheridan	White Rock	Portsmith
Mount Sheridan	Edmonton	Edmonton

White Rock is a suburb of Cairns in the Cairns Region, Queensland, Australia. In the 2021 census, White Rock had a population of 4,918 people.

== Geography ==
The Bruce Highway and the North Coast Railway Line form the western boundary of the suburb with Skeleton Creek and Smiths Creek (tributaries of the Trinity Inlet) forming the southern and eastern boundary respectively.

== History ==
White Rock is situated in the Yidinji traditional Aboriginal country. The geographical feature of White Rock is also known as Jirriwanday in the Yidiny Aboriginal language. The origin of the suburb name is from a historical railway station named after the geographical feature located in Lamb Range.

On 11 January 1939 at the Lands Office in Cairns, the Queensland Government auctioned 25 suburban lots mostly of about 2 roods (22,000 sq ft; 2,000 m^{2}) about 16.9806°S 145.7452°E to the north of the former White Rock railway station (16.9842°S 145.7428°E).

Trinity Anglican School opened its White Rock Campus on 25 January 1983. It opened a second primary school campus at Kewarra Beach in 2002.

White Rock State School opened on 25 January 1988.

Trinity Baptist Church was built in 1996.

== Demographics ==
In the 2016 census, White Rock had a population of 4,730 people.

In the 2021 census, White Rock had a population of 4,918 people.

== Education ==
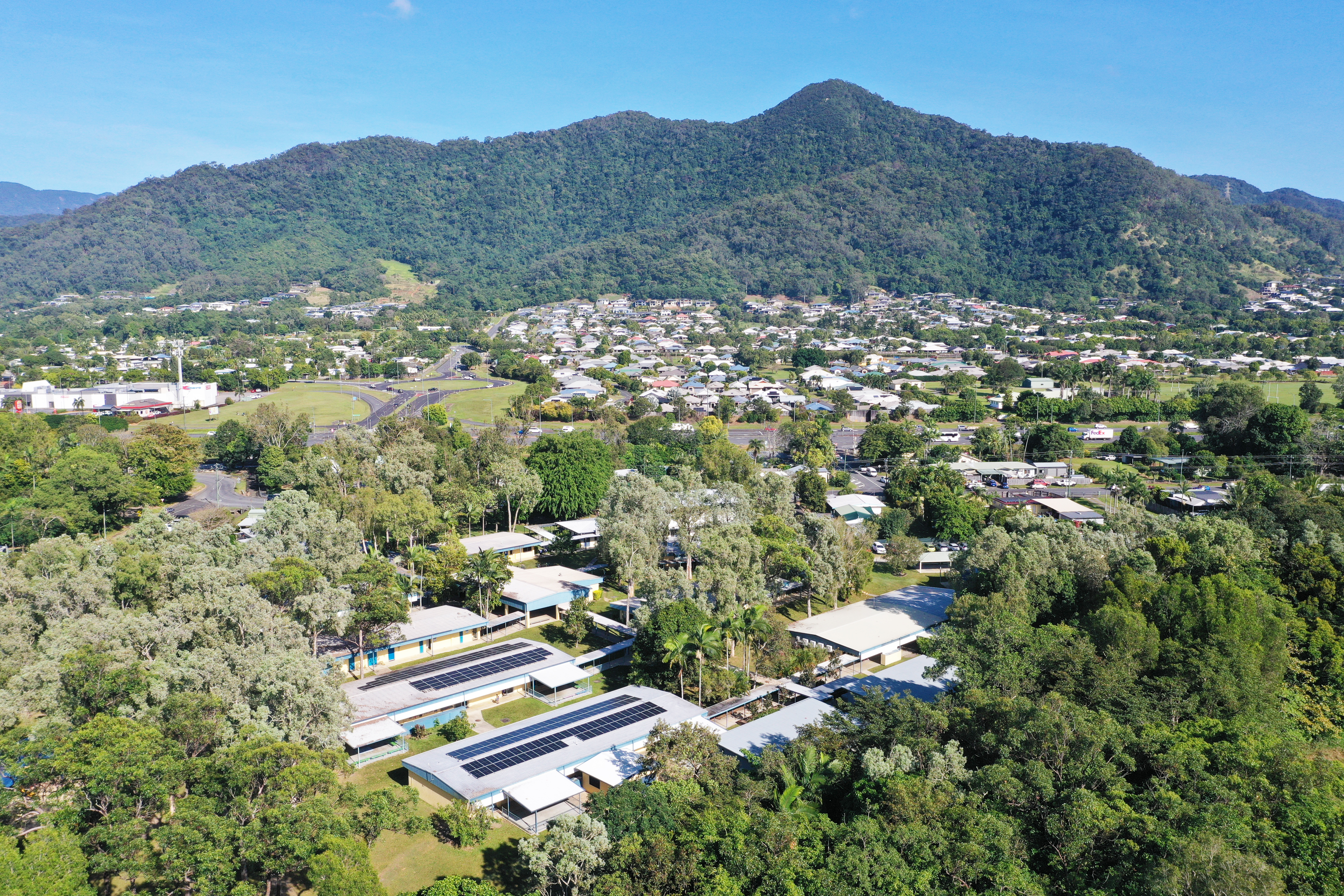
White Rock State School, 2024

White Rock State School is a government primary (Prep-6) school for boys and girls at 114-126 Progress Road (16.9872°S 145.7432°E). In 2016, the school had an enrolment of 522 students with 39 teachers (35 full-time equivalent) and 28 non-teaching staff (19 full-time equivalent). In 2018, the school had an enrolment of 514 students with 42 teachers (36 full-time equivalent) and 25 non-teaching staff (17 full-time equivalent). It includes a special education program.

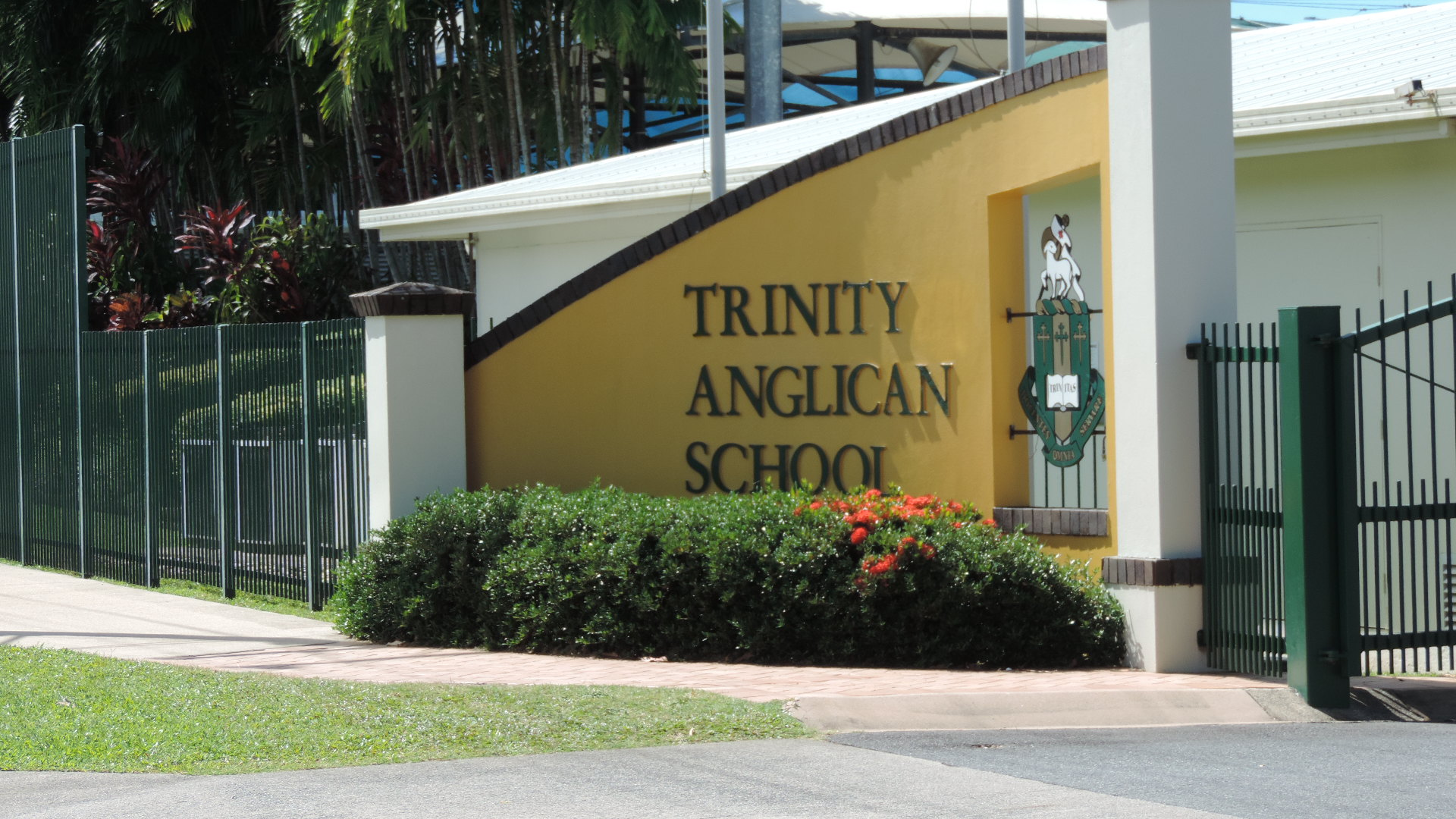
Entrance to Trinity Anglican School, 2018

Trinity Anglican School is a private primary and secondary (Prep-12) school for boys and girls at 4-54 Sheehy Road (16.9788°S 145.7448°E). It has another primary campus at Kewarra Beach. In 2018, the school had an enrolment of 725 students with 69 teachers (66 full-time equivalent) and 51 non-teaching staff (42 full-time equivalent).

There are no government secondary schools in White Rock. The nearest government secondary schools are Woree State High School in neighbouring Woree to the north-west and Bentley Park College in Bentley Park to the south-west.

== Amenities ==
Trinity Baptist Church is at 115 Progress Road (16.9875°S 145.7426°E).
