= St Stephen's Catholic College =

Location
- Mareeba, Queensland; Australia; 17°01′06″S 145°25′11″E

Information
- Type: Independent, co-educational, secondary, day
- Motto: Habe fiduciam in Domino (Trust in the Lord)
- Denomination: Roman Catholic
- Established: 2006
- Founder: Gerard Simon
- Principal: Gary Conwell
- Grades: 7–12
- Enrollment: 530 (2015)
- Colours: Beige & royal blue
- Affiliations: Saint Stephen
- Website: www.sscc.qld.edu.au//

St Stephen's Catholic College, (also known as "St Stephen's"), is a Catholic co-educational high school in Mareeba, Queensland, Australia.

St Stephen's is a secondary school located in Mareeba, approximately 60 km west of Cairns. It was founded in 2006.

== Honour board ==
Year	College Captain	College Dux	Saint Mary Stephen Award for Character
2006	Cale Querin and Caitlin Jerome	N/A	N/A
2007	Marc Schinkel and Meaghan Stefanutti	N/A	N/A
2008	Mark Petersen and Maddison Webster	N/A	N/A
2009	Jaden Guy and Brianna Wright	N/A	N/A
2010	Mark Petersen and Katia Sciani	Rebecca Gillies	Mark Petersen
2011	Ryan Bird and Emma Tudini	Emma Tudini	Hannah Zazzi
2012	Brendan Keeling and Katherine Spring	Meg Donovan	Meg Donovan
2013	Brett Letcher and Kai Priestly	Kai Priestly	Hope Musch
2014	Jack Petersen and Kylie Walmsley	Jack Petersen	Olivia Pezzelato
2015	Joshua Priestly and Mellory Aitken	William Snell	Alexandria Struthers
2016	Vivek Kolala Christopher Stack Rebecca Hermanus Kate Wilcox	Kate Willcox	Reebecca Hermanus
2017	Matthew Chesseman Ashley Greenwood Amelia Aiken Tulani Lea’uanae	Aaron Bryce	Amelia Aiken
2018	David Bin Joshua Kievit Gabriella Cuda Elena Pilat	Ellana Spena	Lauren Davis
2019	Jake Priestly Jonah Williams Deborah Hermanus Kyrah Johnston	Megan Crane	Makala Meaney
2020	Ethan Backshall Andrew Gallo Jenna Kerswell Aarin Ryan	Giulia Pilat Aarin Ryan	Jenna Kerswell
2021	Cassie Bale Joseph Montanger Sara Donovan Sophie Schrale	Tahlia Spena	Joseph Montanger
2022	Taiyo-Noel Moriguchi Joshua Snell Ilana Bannink Alannah Falvo	Joshua Snell	Eloise Bertola
2023	Nicholas Brammar Milan Maloberti Eva Mclennan Caitlin Wadley	Caitlin Wadley	Eva Mclennan
2024	Michael Liu Rylan Srhoj Ella Daven Manvir Kaur		

== See also ==
- Catholic Education Cairns
- List of schools in Far North Queensland
