= Earlville, Queensland =

Earlville Cairns, Queensland
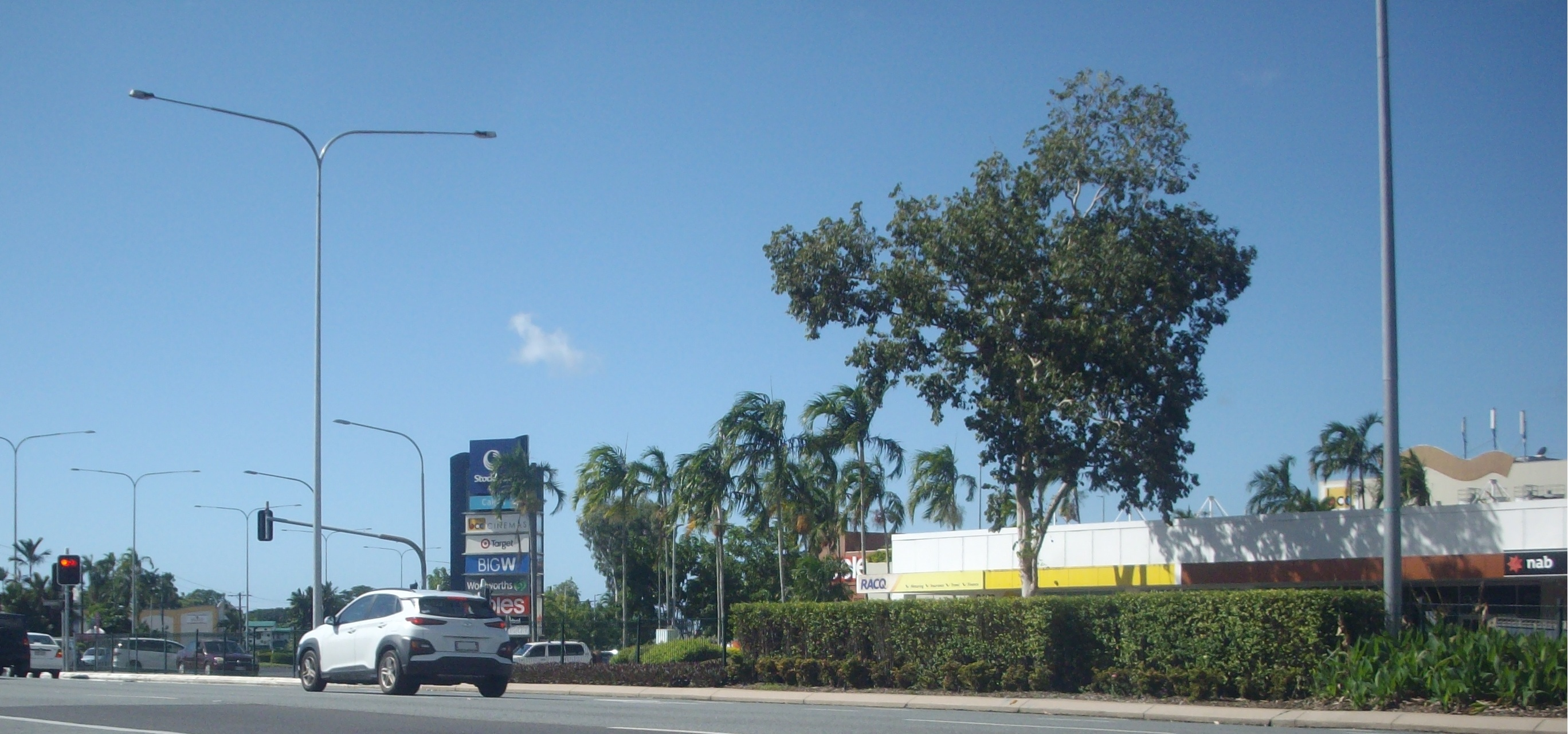
- Mulgrave Road/Bruce Highway (Alt)

- Coordinates: 16.9477°S 145.7311°E
- Population: 4,200 (2021 census)
  - Density: 1,200/km^{2} (3,110/sq mi)
- Postcode(s): 4870
- Elevation: 10–170 m (33–558 ft)
- Area: 3.5 km^{2} (1.4 sq mi)
- Time zone: AEST (UTC+10:00)
- Location: 2.6 km (2 mi) N of Woree; 2.9 km (2 mi) SW of Manunda; 4.4 km (3 mi) SW of Cairns CBD; 343 km (213 mi) NNW of Townsville; 1,694 km (1,053 mi) NNW of Brisbane
- LGA(s): Cairns Region
- State electorate(s): Cairns
- Federal division(s): Leichhardt
Suburbs around Earlville:
| Lamb Range | Mooroobool | Bungalow |
| Lamb Range | Earlville | Woree |
| Lamb Range | Bayview Heights | Woree |

Earlville is a suburb of Cairns in the Cairns Region, Queensland, Australia. In the 2021 census, Earlville had a population of 4,200 people.

== Geography ==
Earlville is approximately 4 kilometres (2.5 miles) south-west of the Cairns City centre.

The north-eastern part of the suburb is low-lying, less than 10 metres (33 ft) above sea level but the land gradually rises towards the west becoming more mountainous in the western part of the suburb. Most of the residential land is in the centre and eastern parts of the suburb, while the more mountainous western part is undeveloped.

Mulgrave Road goes through the suburb from the north-east (Mooroobool / Bungalow) and then bends through the suburb to the south-east (Woree).

Gaviolis Hill is in the south-west corner of the suburb (16.9525°S 145.7338°E) at 74 metres (243 ft) above sea level. It's also known as Henleys Hill and the hill is a park known as Henleys Hill Park.

== History ==
Earlville is situated in the Yidinji traditional Aboriginal country.

Most of the eastern part of the present suburb formed part of the pioneer Hap Wah sugarcane plantation which was developed from 1878 by a Chinese consortium led by Andrew Leon. In 1886, after not finding it profitable, the plantation was sold. Mulgrave Road was then known as Hap Wah Road.

The origin of the suburb name is from the Earl family who lived in the area. The historical name of Balaclava deriving from the historical estate name is still retained in business and organisation names, as well as in the naming of Balaclava Road, a prominent thoroughfare in the suburb.

Our Lady Help of Christians Catholic School was established on 28 January 1964 by the Sisters of Mercy. There was an initial enrolment of 51 students with principal Sister M Consilia Wallwork assisted by a second teacher Sister M Agatha. The sisters lived at St Joseph's in Parramatta Park and travelled to the school each day. One of the classrooms was used for church services until the church was built.

The Roman Catholic parish of Earlville was established with the appointment of the Reverend Pat McKenna as parish priest from 1 January 1965. It had previously been part of the Parramatta Park parish. The church dedicated to Our Lady Help of Christians was blessed and opened by Bishop John Torpie on 22 July 1973.

The current Earlville Public Library opened in 1983, with a major refurbishment in 2003 and a minor refurbishment in 2007.

== Demographics ==
In the 2016 census, Earlville had a population of 4,030 people.

In the 2021 census, Earlville had a population of 4,200 people.

== Education ==
Our Lady Help of Christians School is a Catholic primary (Prep-6) school for boys and girls at 18 Balaclava Road (16.9430°S 145.7371°E). In 2018, the school had an enrolment of 551 students with 35 teachers (32 full-time equivalent) and 25 non-teaching staff (20 full-time equivalent).

There are no government schools in Earlville. The nearest government primary schools are Balaclava State School in neighbouring Mooroobool to the north-east and Woree State School in neighbouring Woree to the south-east. The nearest government secondary schools are Woree State High School in Woree and Trinity Bay State High School in Manunda to the north-east.

== Amenities ==
Stockland Cairns Shopping Centre is on Mulgrave Road (16.944°S 145.740°E) in the suburb. Within it are:

- Earlville Post Office (16.9426°S 145.7402°E)
- Earlville Public Library operated by the Cairns Regional Council
- Earlville Police Beat Shopfront (16.9450°S 145.7402°E).

The Earlville branch of the Queensland Country Women's Association meets at 38-40 Yarrum Street.

Our Lady Help of Christian's Catholic Church is at 18 Balaclava Street. It is within the Earlville Parish of the Roman Catholic Diocese of Cairns.

Cairns Southside International Hotel is on Mulgrave Road (16.9396°S 145.7427°E). It offers accommodation, restaurants and bars.

Seville Mercy Conference Centre is a conference centre with on-site accommodation and dining at 35 Bauhinia Avenue (16.9472°S 145.7255°E). It is operated by the Sisters of Mercy.
