= Mooroobool, Queensland =

Mooroobool
- Suburb
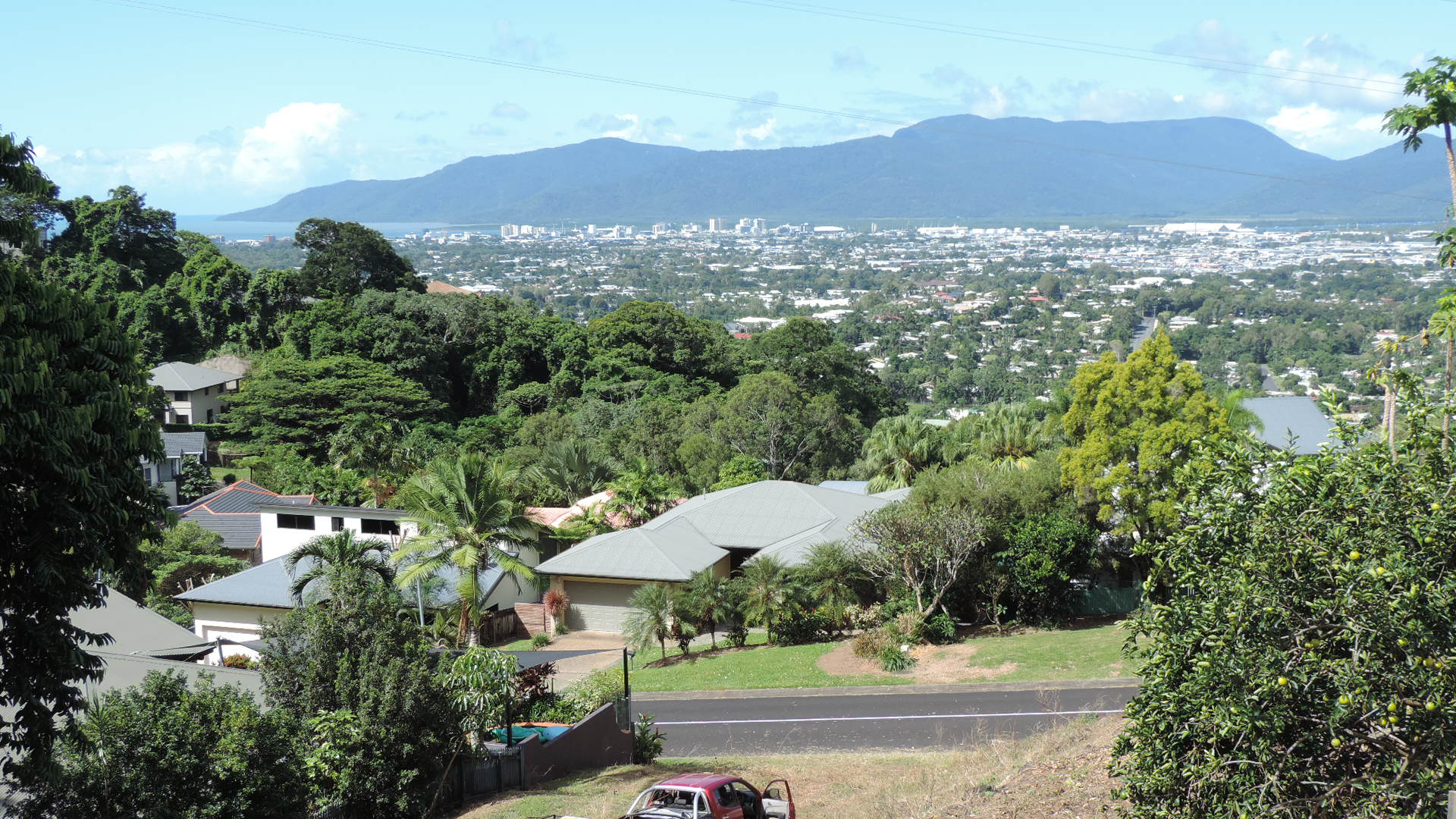
- View across Mooroobool from Coreega Close, 2018

- Interactive map of Mooroobool
- Coordinates: 16.9361°S 145.7297°E
- Country: Australia
- State: Queensland
- City: Cairns
- LGA: Cairns Region
- Location: 5.5 km (3.4 mi) W of Cairns CBD; 345 km (214 mi) NNW of Townsville; 1,704 km (1,059 mi) NNW of Brisbane

Government
  - State electorate: Cairns
  - Federal division: Leichhardt

Area
  - Total: 4.6 km^{2} (1.8 sq mi)

Population
  - Total: 7,136 (2021 census)
  - Density: 1,551/km^{2} (4,020/sq mi)
- Time zone: UTC+10:00 (AEST)
- Postcode: 4870
Suburbs around Mooroobool
| Kanimbla | Manoora | Manunda |
| Lamb Range | Mooroobool | Westcourt |
| Earlville | Earlville | Bungalow |

Mooroobool is a western suburb of Cairns in the Cairns Region, Queensland, Australia. In the 2021 census, Mooroobool had a population of 7,136 people.

== Geography ==
Mooroobool is 5.5 kilometres (3.4 mi) by road west of the Cairns central business district.

Mooroobool has a mixture of dwellings which are mainly residential and commercial properties. Nearby suburbs are Earlville and Kanimbla.

== History ==
Mooroobool is situated in the Yidinji traditional Aboriginal country.

The suburb was named by the Queensland Place Names Board on 1 September 1973. The origin of the suburb name is from the geographical feature Mooroobool Peak located west from the suburb, named from an Aboriginal word meaning 'meeting of the waters'.

Kingsford Street is named after Richard Ash Kingsford, who was mayor of Cairns from 1885-1886 and in 1889.

Balaclava State School opened on 2 February 1954.

== Demographics ==
In the 2006 census, Mooroobool had a population of 6,618people.

In the 2016 census, Mooroobool had a population of 7,222 people.

In the 2021 census, Mooroobool had a population of 7,136 people.

== Education ==
Balaclava State School is a government primary (Prep-6) school for boys and girls at 418 Mulgrave Road (16.9367°S 145.7449°E). In 2017, the school had an enrolment of 353 students with 31 teachers (29 full-time equivalent) and 26 non-teaching staff (17 full-time equivalent). The school has a special education program.

There are no secondary schools in Mooroobool. The nearest government secondary schools are Trinity Bay State High School in neighbouring Manunda to the north-east and Woree State High School in Woree to the south-east.

== Amenities ==
Mooroobool has a Campbell’s Super IGA and a police beat.

== Attractions ==
Campbells Lookout is on Lake Morris Road (16.9322°S 145.7222°E). It provides good views across Cairns.
