= Trinity Anglican School =

- Trinity Anglican School (White Rock Senior) front gate (ca 2019)

Location
- Cairns, Queensland; Australia; 16°58′44″S 145°44′42″E

Information
- Type: Independent
- Motto: Latin: Docentes Omnia Servare (Teaching them to observe all things)
- Religious affiliation: Anglican
- Established: 1983
- Chairman: Trent Twomey
- Principal: Paul Sjogren
- Enrolment: 1,062 (2023)
- Campuses: Kewarra Beach & White Rock
- Colours: White, green, grey
- Website: www.tas.qld.edu.au

Trinity Anglican School (TAS) is an independent, Anglican, co-educational, P-12 school, located in the Cairns suburb of White Rock, in Far North Queensland, Australia. It is administered by Independent Schools Queensland, with an enrolment of 1,062 students and a teaching staff of 88, as of 2023. The school serves students from Prep to Year 12.

== History ==
The school opened on 25 January 1983.

In 2015, TAS White Rock opened the Science Technology Engineering Mathematics (STEM) building (S-Block) designed by Charles Wright Architects, for students in Years 7 to 12.

== Alumni ==
Catriona Gray, the winner of Miss Universe 2018, was a student at Trinity Anglican School.

== See also ==
- List of schools in Far North Queensland
