= Bungalow, Queensland =

Bungalow Cairns, Queensland
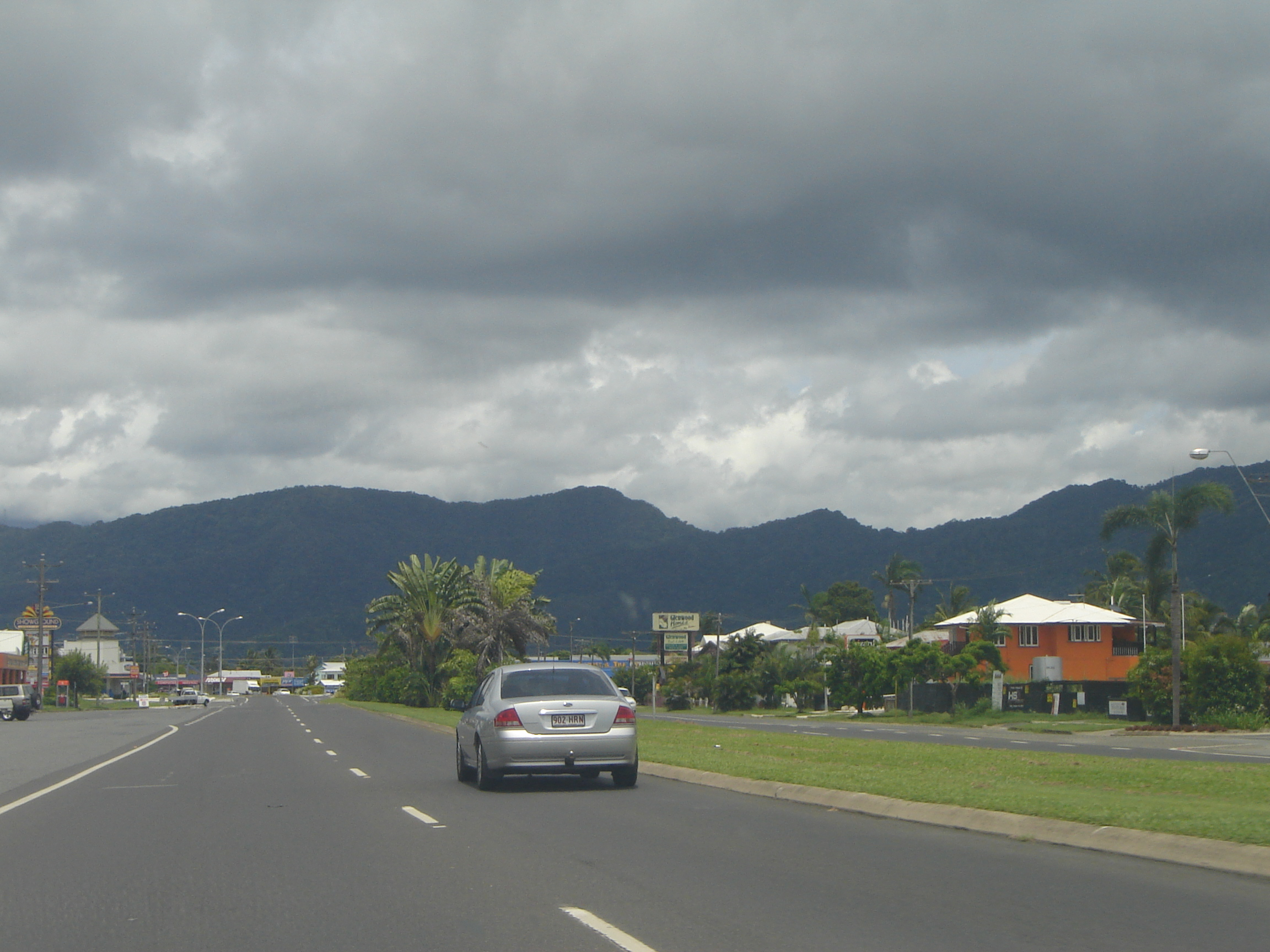
- Mulgrave Road near intersection with Buchan Street looking south-west with Bungalow to the left, 2006

- Coordinates: 16.9383°S 145.7555°E
- Population: 2,358 (2021 census)
  - Density: 1,072/km^{2} (2,780/sq mi)
- Postcode(s): 4870
- Area: 2.2 km^{2} (0.8 sq mi)
- Time zone: AEST (UTC+10:00)
- Location: 2.8 km (2 mi) SW of Cairns CBD; 1,685 km (1,047 mi) NNW of Brisbane
- LGA(s): Cairns Region
- State electorate(s): Cairns
- Federal division(s): Leichhardt
Suburbs around Bungalow:
Westcourt	Westcourt	Parramatta Park
Mooroobool	Bungalow	Portsmith
Earlville	Woree	Portsmith

Bungalow is an inner suburb of Cairns in the Cairns Region, Queensland, Australia. In the 2021 census, Bungalow had a population of 2,358 people.

== Geography ==
The suburb is bounded to the north by Mulgrave Street (one of the major thoroughfares through Cairns connecting the Bruce Highway from the south to the Captain Cook Highway to the north) and by Hartley Street to the south. The suburb is almost entirely freehold and has a mixture of residential and commercial areas with no green space or other civic amenities.

== History ==
Bungalow is situated in the Yidinji traditional Aboriginal country.

The suburb name comes from "The Bungalow", the residence of Archdeacon Joseph Campbell, a clergyman and agricultural entrepreneur.

The Cairns Germania Club was established on 4 July 1971 to cater for the needs of German speaking migrants with an initial nine members. The club's activities expanded to include folk dancing. In July 1980 the club wanted a clubhouse and purchased a former church in Winkworth Street for $21,000. In 1991 the organisation renamed itself the German-Austrian-Swiss Association to reflect their wider German-speaking membership, and later simplified their trading name to German Club Cairns.

Bungalow railway station was on Spence Street (16.9345°S 145.7637°E) on the North Coast railway line . The railway line has been re-aligned and the station has been dismantled.

== Demographics ==
In the 2016 census, Bungalow had a population of 2,159 people.

In the 2021 census, Bungalow had a population of 2,358 people.

== Education ==
There are no schools in Bungalow. The nearest government primary schools are Parramatta State School in neighbouring Parramatta Park to the north-east and Balaclava State School in neighbouring Mooroobool to the west. The nearest government secondary school is Trinity Bay State High School in Manunda to the north.

== Amenities ==
Showground Shopping Centre is at 157-173 Mulgrave Road (16.9286°S 145.7607°E). It takes its name from the nearby Cairns Showground in neighbouring Parramatta Park.

The German Club Cairns is at 57 Winkworth Street (16.9296°S 145.7592°E).
