= Copperlode Falls Dam =

Dam in Queensland, Australia

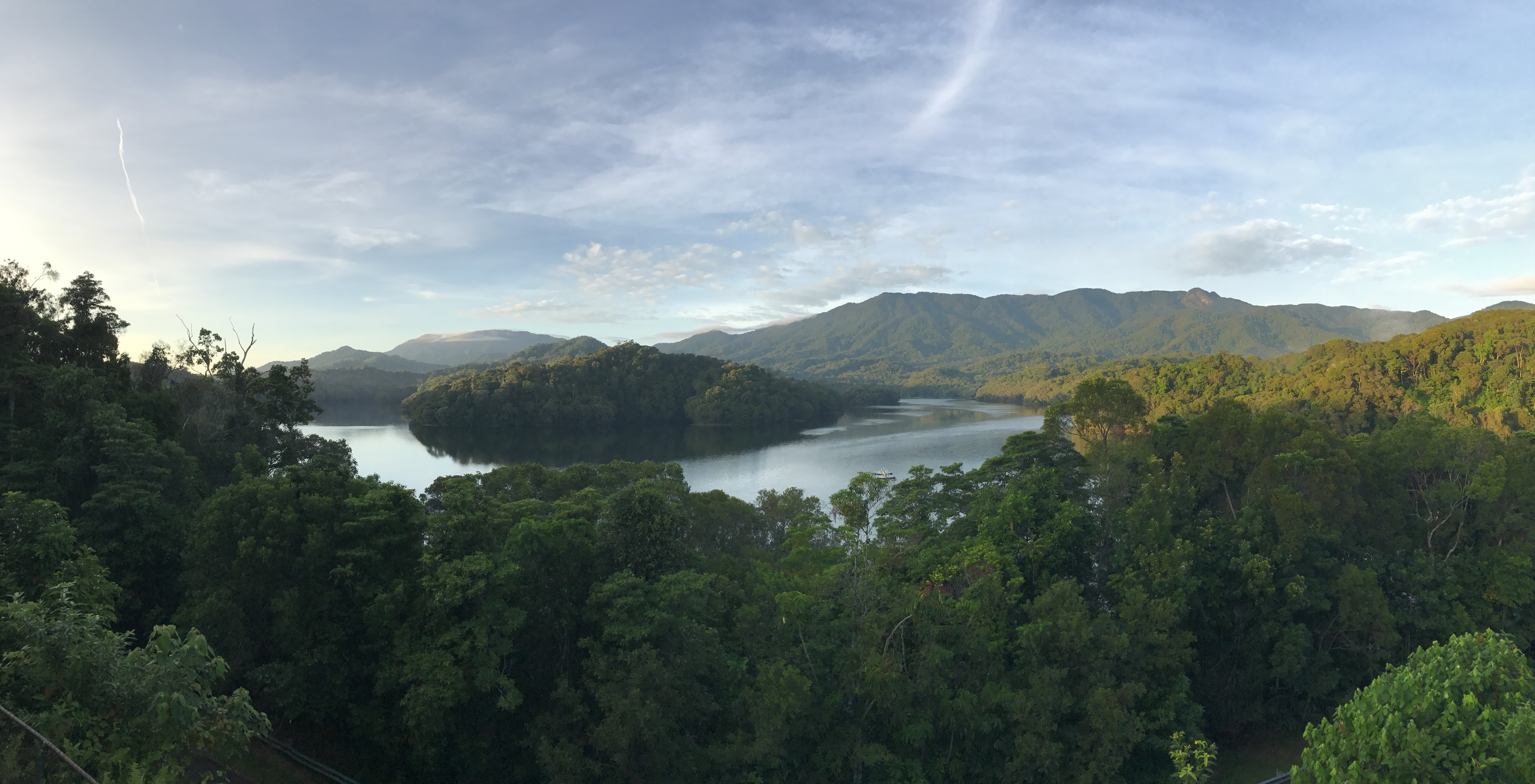
- Lake Morris, the reservoir

- Location of the dam in Queensland
- Interactive map of Copperlode Falls Dam
- Country: Australia
- Location: 11 km (6.8 mi) southwest of Cairns, Far North Queensland
- Coordinates: 16°58′47″S 145°40′26″E
- Purpose: Water supply
- Status: Operational
- Opening date: 1976
- Construction cost: A$6.5 million
- Built by: G Abignano
- Operator: Cairns-Mulgrave Water Supply Board

Dam and spillways
- Type of dam: Rock-fill dam
- Impounds: Freshwater Creek
- Height (foundation): 45 m (148 ft)
- Length: 126 m (413 ft)
- Dam volume: 310 m (1,020 ft)
- Spillway type: Uncontrolled
- Spillway capacity: 490 m^{3}/s (17,000 cu ft/s)

Reservoir
- Creates: Lake Morris
- Total capacity: 45,560 ML (36,940 acre⋅ft)
- Catchment area: 44 km^{2} (17 sq mi)
- Surface area: 332.7 ha (822 acres)
- Normal elevation: 407 m (1,335 ft) AHD

The Copperlode Falls Dam is a rock-filled embankment dam across Freshwater Creek, located at Lamb Range, in the Cairns Region of Queensland, Australia. Completed in 1976, the resultant reservoir, Lake Morris, supplies potable water to the city of Cairns.

The reservoir was named in honour of Cairns City Council engineer, Frank Roland Morris, who discovered the proposed dam site, and the dam itself is named after the waterfalls, Copperlode Falls, that were flooded by the impoundment.

== History ==
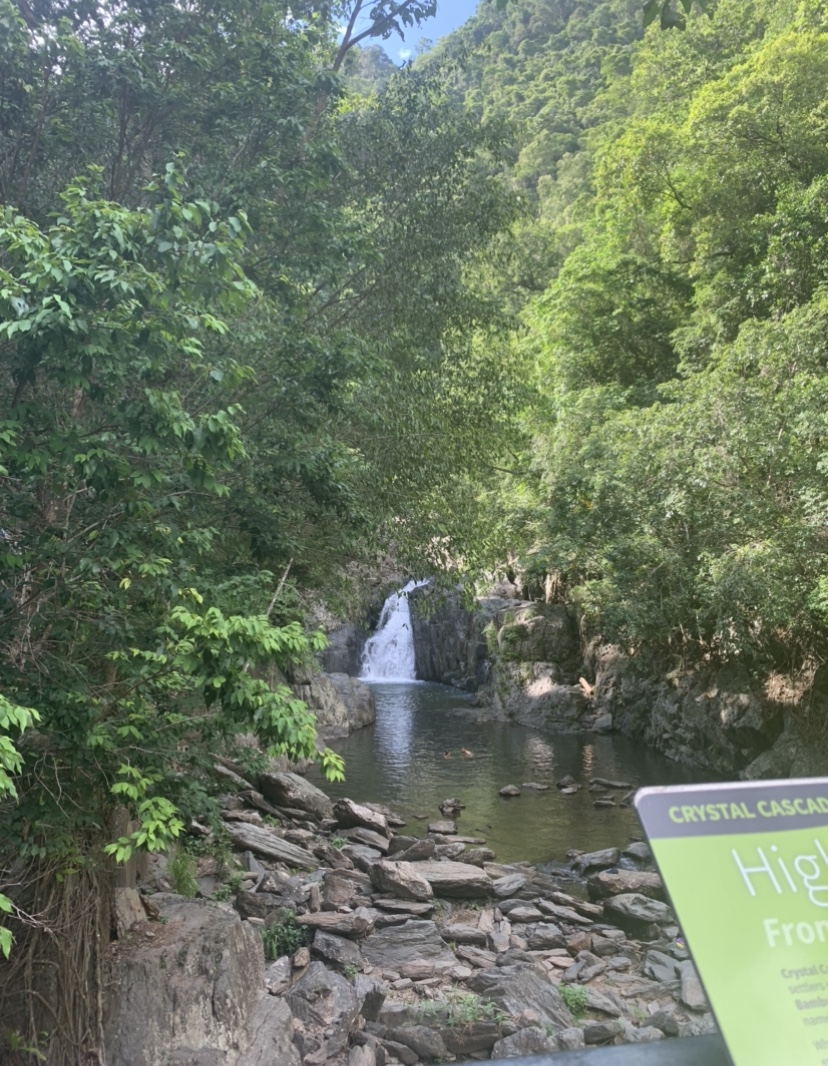
Waterfall near Copperlode Falls Dam, in 2020

Originally Cairns' water needs were met with water drawn from Freshwater Creek and Behana Creek. It was evident to even the earliest settlers that a larger source of water would need to be secured as Cairns grew. With this in mind, one of the city's engineers, Frank Morris, explored the Lamb Range to the west of the city to find a place to build a dam. In 1935, he found a site at Copperlode Falls, near the headwaters of Freshwater Creek, that he thought would be suitable. Many years later, after a series of surveys confirmed the site's suitability, the Queensland Government approved the site for construction of an earth- and rock-fill embankment dam. The State Government originally set aside A$3 million for the dam, but by the time the dam was completed on 25 March 1976, the total cost had risen to approximately $6.5 million.

The dam wall is 45 metres (148 ft) high and 126 m (413 ft) long. The reservoir holds 45,560 megalitres (36,940 acre⋅ft) (Note: By comparison, the reservoir formed by Tinaroo Dam has a 407,000-megalitre (330,000 acre⋅ft) capacity.) over a surface area of 332.7 hectares (822 acres), drawing on a catchment area of 44 square kilometres (17 sq mi). A reinforced masonry wall was added to the dam crest in 1993 to prevent waves from overtopping the wall in the event of extreme floods.

In 2015, barramundi fingerlings were first stocked in the reservoir.

== See also ==
- List of dams and reservoirs in Australia
- Crystal Cascades
- Barron River
