= Bentley Park, Queensland =

Bentley Park
- Suburb
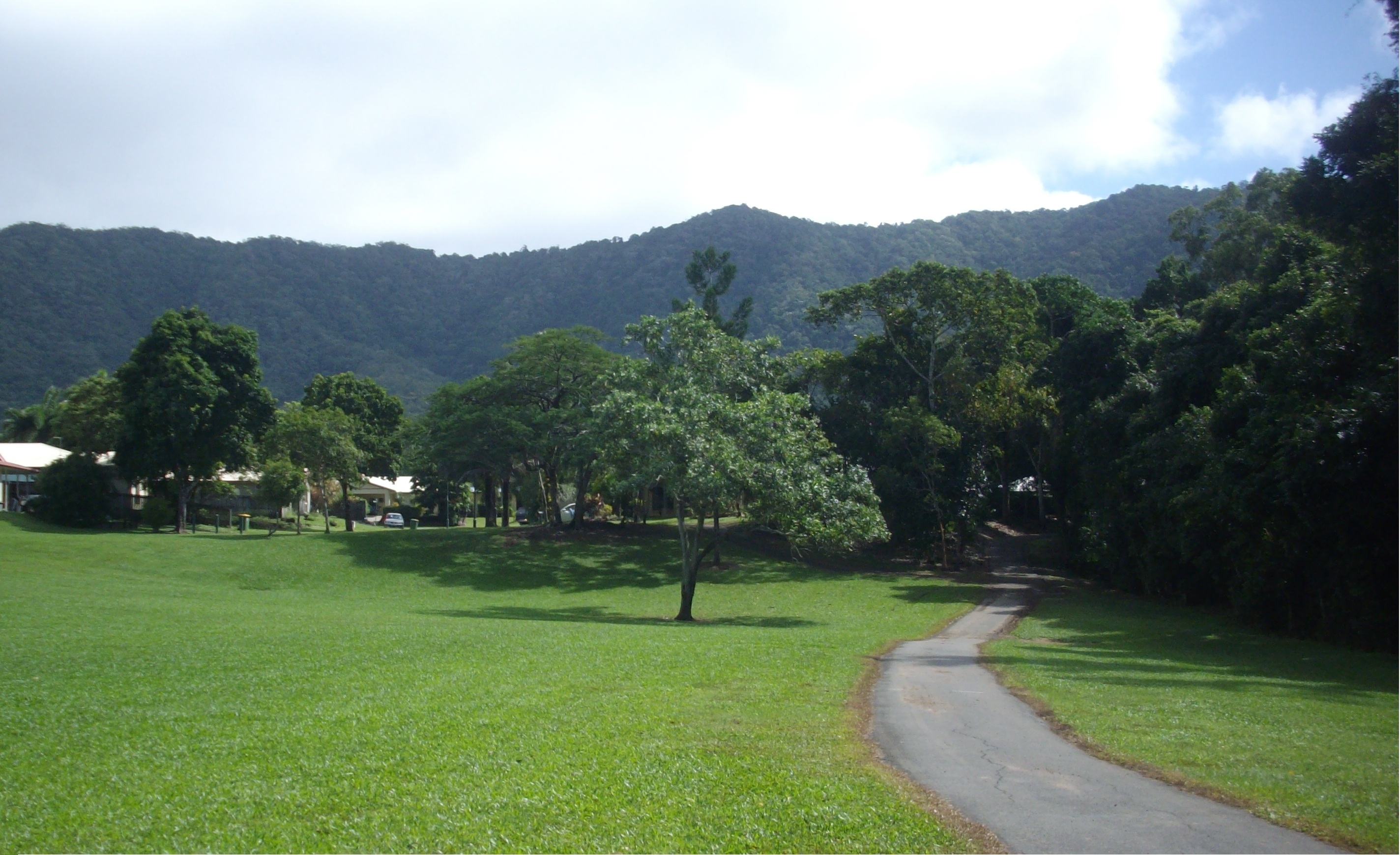
- View from Bentley Park with Fletcher Court and Lamb Range in background, 2020

- Interactive map of Bentley Park
- Coordinates: 17.0108°S 145.7230°E
- Country: Australia
- State: Queensland
- LGA: Cairns Region
- Location: 2.6 km (1.6 mi) N of Edmonton; 12.2 km (7.6 mi) SSW of Cairns CBD; 336 km (209 mi) NNW of Townsville; 1,694 km (1,053 mi) NNW of Brisbane

Government
  - State electorate: Mulgrave
  - Federal division: Kennedy

Area
  - Total: 6.9 km^{2} (2.7 sq mi)
- Elevation: 9 to 302 m (30 to 991 ft)

Population
  - Total: 8,360 (2021 census)
  - Density: 1,212/km^{2} (3,138/sq mi)
- Postcode: 4869
Suburbs around Bentley Park
Lamb Range	Mount Sheridan	White Rock
Lamb Range	Bentley Park	Edmonton
Lamb Range	Edmonton	Edmonton

Bentley Park is a south-western suburb of Cairns within the local government area of Cairns Region, Queensland, Australia. It is located approximately 9 km (6 mi) south of the Cairns CBD. In the 2021 census, Bentley Park had a population of 8,360 people.

== Geography ==
The suburb is bounded to the east by the Bruce Highway and the North Coast railway line, which enter the locality from the south-east (Edmonton) and exit to the north-east (Mount Sheridan / White Rock).

The suburb is bounded to the south by Bana Gindarja Creek, which flows into Wrights Creek and then via the Trinity Inlet to the Coral Sea.

The land rises from an elevation of 9 metres (30 ft) aboe sea level in the east of the locality to 302 metres (991 ft) in the west of the locality.

The predominant land use is suburban housing. Despite the residential nature of the area, a cane tramway passes from the north (Mount Sheridan) through to the south (Edmonton) towards the Mulgrave sugar mill in Gordonvale.

== History ==
Bentley Park is situated in the Yidinji traditional Aboriginal country. The origin of the suburb name is from a property titled Bentley Hall in England, named by an early settler Isaac Abraham Hartill.

The Edmonton Catholic School was established on 29 April 1929 by the Sisters of Mercy with an initial enrolment of 30 pupils. In 1965, it was renamed St Therese’s School. As suburban development increased around Edmonton, the rising number of students made it necessary to relocate the school to neighbouring Bentley Park in 1995. Although now under lay leadership, the school continues to be operated in the Mercy tradition.

Bentley Park State School opened in 1997. In 1999, it was decided to expand it to incorporate secondary schooling, with the middle school opening in 2001 and the first Year 12 students graduating in 2004. With the addition of secondary schooling, it was renamed Bentley Park College.

Bana Gindarja Creek was previously known as Blackfellow Creek until it was renamed in 2023.

== Demographics ==
In the 2011 census, Bentley Park had a population of 7,420 people.

In the 2016 census, Bentley Park had a population of 8,018 people.

In the 2021 census, Bentley Park had a population of 8,360 people.

== Education ==
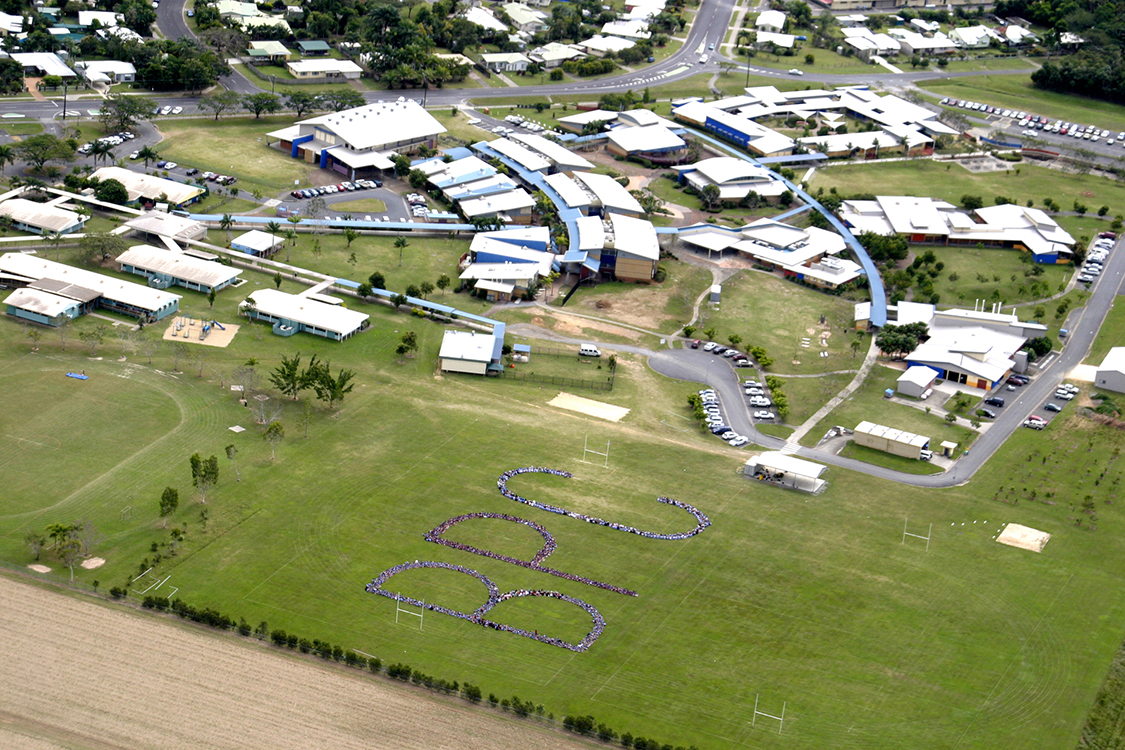
Bentley Park College campus, 2007

St Therese's School is a Catholic primary (Prep-6) school for boys and girls at 135 Robert Road (17.0064°S 145.7312°E). In 2018, the school had an enrolment of 620 students with 41 teachers (38 full-time equivalent) and 30 non-teaching staff (19 full-time equivalent).

Bentley Park College is a government primary and secondary (Prep-12) school for boys and girls at McLaughlin Road (17.0093°S 145.7400°E). In 2018, the school had an enrolment of 1541 students with 126 teachers (122 full-time equivalent) and 85 non-teaching staff (64 full-time equivalent). It includes a special education program.
