= Lamb Range =

- Suburb
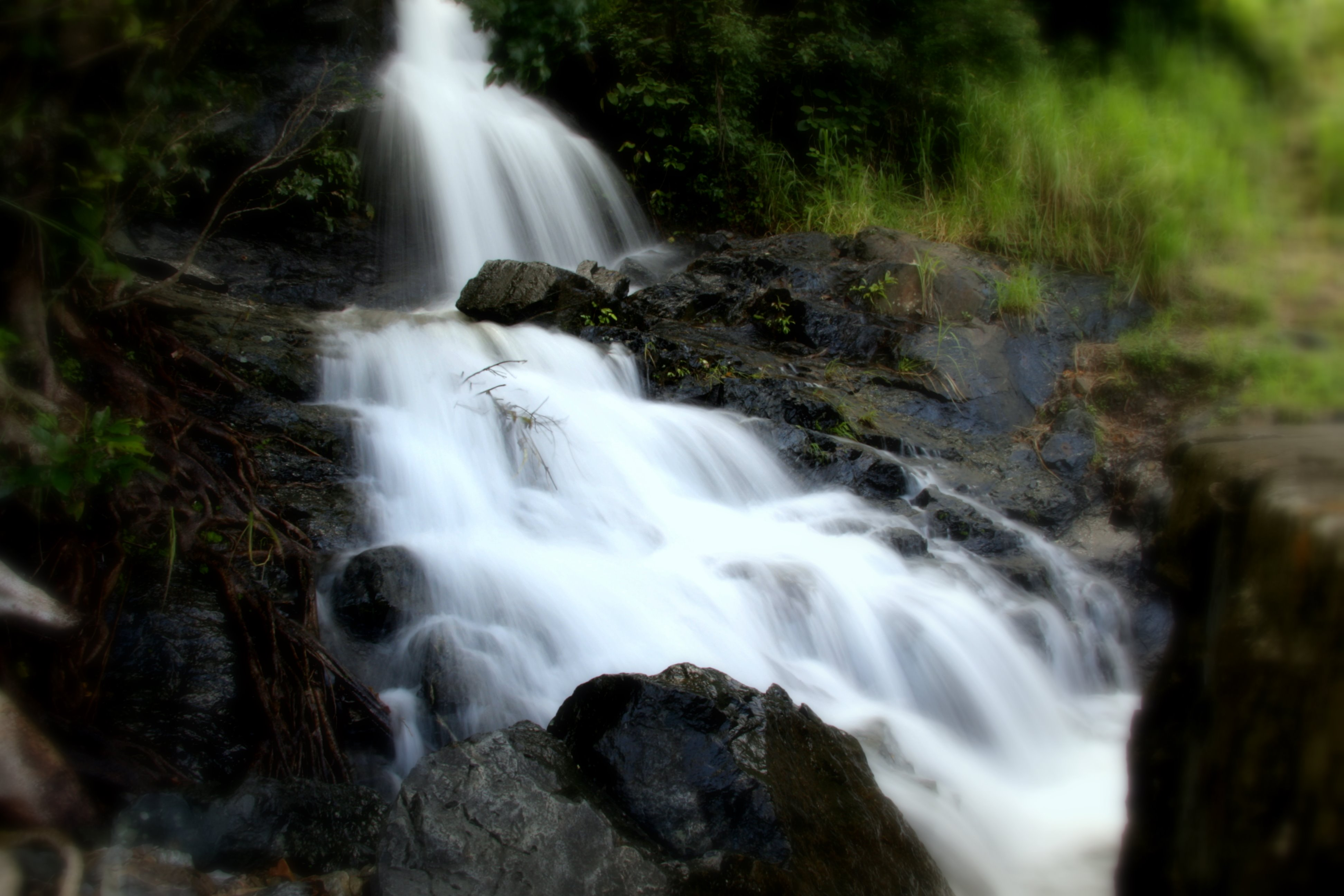
- Waterfall near Copperlode Falls Dam, 2008

- Interactive map of Lamb Range
- Coordinates: 17.0477°S 145.6886°E
- Country: Australia
- State: Queensland
- LGA: Cairns Region
- Location: 15.5 km (9.6 mi) NNW of Gordonvale; 17.3 km (10.7 mi) SSW of Cairns CBD; 1,692 km (1,051 mi) NNW of Brisbane

Government
  - State electorates: Mulgrave; Cairns
  - Federal divisions: Kennedy; Leichhardt

Area
  - Total: 218.2 km^{2} (84.2 sq mi)

Population
  - Total: 0 (2021 census)
  - Density: 0.0000/km^{2} (0.000/sq mi)
- Time zone: UTC+10:00 (AEST)
- Postcode: 4870
Suburbs around Lamb Range
Speewah; Koah	Barron Gorge; Redlynch; Kanimbla	Mooroobool; Earlville; Bayview Heights
Mareeba	Lamb Range	Mount Sheridan; Bentley Park; Edmonton; Mount Peter
Danbulla	Gadgarra; Goldsborough	Gordonvale; Little Mulgrave

Lamb Range is a locality in the Cairns Region, Queensland, Australia. In the 2021 census, Lamb Range had "no people or a very low population".

== Geography ==
The locality takes its name from the mountain range Lamb Range.

The locality that lies to the west of most of the southern suburbs of Cairns. It is undeveloped mountainous land rising from the coastal plains (elevation of less than 50 metres above sea level) up through the Great Dividing Range (with elevations up to 1200 metres) towards the Atherton Tableland. The land use is entirely committed to national parks and reserves. Dinden National Park and Lake Morris Reserve are in the north of the locality with Little Mulgrave National Park in the south. A small area in the west is in the Danbulla National Park.

There is only one road through the locality. The Gillies Range Road (also known as the Gillies Highway) passes through the south of the locality connecting Gordonvale in the Cairns Region with Atherton in the Tablelands Region. Lake Morris Road commences in Kanimbla and passes through Mooroobool and then travels through Lamb Range to Lake Morris but does not extend beyond the dam.

== Demographics ==
In the 2016 census, Lamb Range had "no people or a very low population".

In the 2021 census, Lamb Range had "no people or a very low population".

== Attractions ==
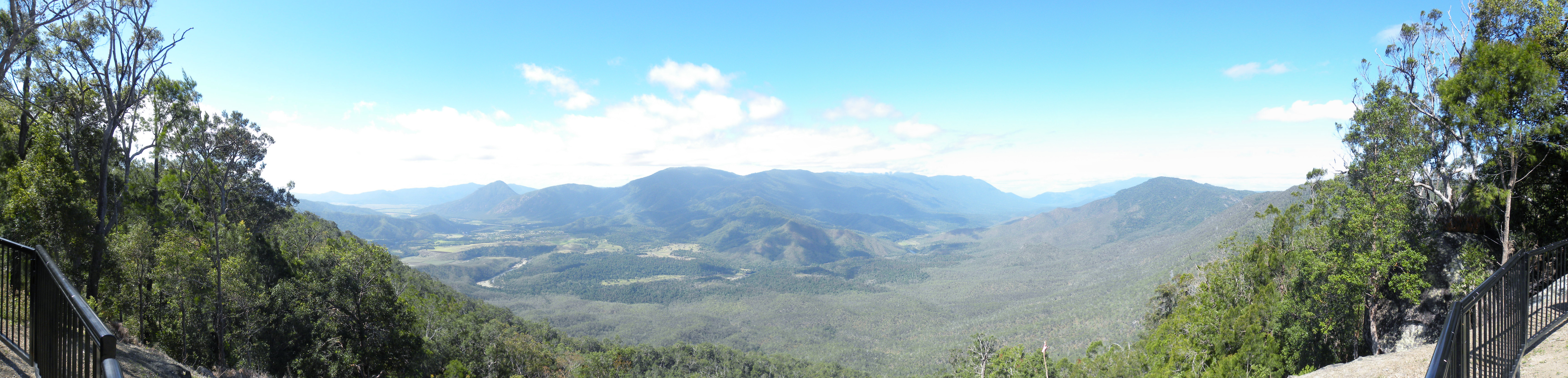
View from the Gillies Lookout off the Gillies Highway, 2011

The Gillies Range Road is a 19 kilometres (12 mi) long road which ranges from an elevation of 20 metres to 820 metres. The road is winding with 263 corners and has a number of lookouts.
