= Good Counsel College, Innisfail =

Good Counsel College

Location
- Innisfail, Queensland; Australia; 17°31′16″S 146°01′42″E

Information
- Type: Independent co-educational secondary day school
- Motto: One Spirit In Christ
- Religious affiliation: Diocese of Cairns
- Denomination: Roman Catholic
- Established: 1975; 51 years ago
- Principal: Rosa Lanzo
- Enrolment: 371 (2018)
- Campus: Innisfail central
- Colours: Grey and navy blue
- Website: www.gcc.qld.edu.au

The Good Counsel College (abbreviated as GCC) is an independent Roman Catholic co-educational secondary day school, located in Innisfail, Queensland, Australia. It is a diocese school administered by the Diocese of Cairns. The school serves Innisfail and South Johnstone / Mourilyan and Innisfail's outlying regional areas, generally extending north to Babinda, south to Tully and Mission Beach and inland to Millaa Millaa.

== History ==
Good Counsel College was established in 1975 as a result of the joining of two separate single sex education institutes: The Sacred Heart Girls School conducted by the Sisters of the Good Samaritan and the Marist Brothers' Boys' School. Initially the school was organized catering only to students in years 8, 9 and 10. However under guidance from the school's first lay principal Peter Albion the school was quickly established as an academic institute offering a full secondary education.

In recent years the school has undergone significant expansion both in terms of enrolments and infrastructure, having trebled the number of enrolments since its inception in 1975.

== House system ==
As is common in Australian secondary schools, students at Good Counsel during interhouse sporting carnivals are split up into four houses, they are Polding (blue) Marcellin (red), MacKillop (purple) and Clancy (Green), but are also commonly used to group students at assemblies and especially during mass transport to event destinations. Each house has an elected male and female captain, who are responsible for aspects of school carnival preparation.

== School song ==
The College's song is One Spirit in Christ.

== See also ==
- Catholic Education Cairns
- Catholic education in Australia
- List of schools in Queensland
