= Woree, Queensland =

Woree
- Suburb
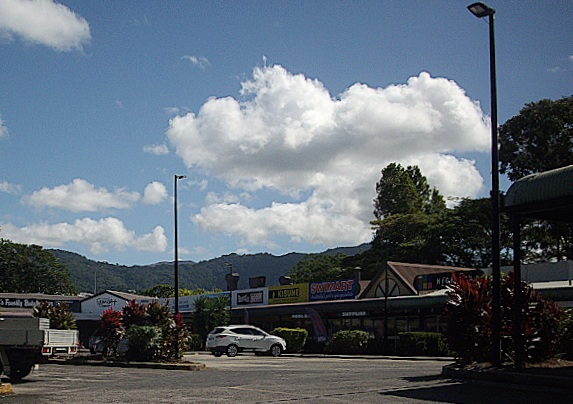
- Southside Shopping Village

- Interactive map of Woree
- Coordinates: 16.9627°S 145.7430°E
- Country: Australia
- State: Queensland
- City: Cairns
- LGA: Cairns Region
- Location: 6.7 km (4.2 mi) S of Cairns CBD; 1,702 km (1,058 mi) NNW of Brisbane

Government
  - State electorates: Cairns; Mulgrave
  - Federal division: Leichhardt

Area
  - Total: 5.8 km^{2} (2.2 sq mi)

Population
  - Total: 5,127 (2021 census)
  - Density: 884/km^{2} (2,289/sq mi)
- Time zone: UTC+10:00 (AEST)
- Postcode: 4868
Suburbs around Woree
Earlville	Bungalow	Portsmith
Bayview Heights	Woree	Portsmith
Mount Sheridan	Mount Sheridan	White Rock

Woree is a suburb of Cairns in the Cairns Region, Queensland, Australia. In the 2021 census, Woree had a population of 5,127 people.

== Geography ==
The Bruce Highway goes between Bald Hills in Brisbane to Woree and is 1,656 kilometres (1,029 mi) long. The highway goes through Woree both southbound, and northbound from (Mount Sheridan / White Rock) and continues north through the suburb, splitting at 16.9564°S 145.7474°E into Mulgrave Road and Ray Jones Drive. Mulgrave Road/Bruce Highway (Alternative Route) continues north-west and exits to Earlville, while Ray Jones Drive/Bruce Highway continues north-east to Portsmith.

== History ==
The name Woree is from the Yidinji Aboriginal traditional group of the predominantly inner-north, inner-north west and south Cairns region areas from the Yidiny language, referring to the young persons near or at the waterways.

The Cairns Jockey Club commenced in Cairns in July 1884 with 50 members. Its first race meeting was proclaimed a holiday. Their current race track is Cannon Park in Woree, which was donated by the Cannon family and the first race was held there in 1911. A grandstand was officially opened on 15 July 1972 by Gordon Chalk, then Minister for Racing.

Woree railway station was named by Queensland Rail in 1914 and the suburb takes its name from the railway station. Prior to this, the area was known as Four Mile and Pryns Station. Woree railway station was (16.9521°S 145.7461°E) on the North Coast railway line, but it was dismantled following the realignment of the railway line.

Woree State School was opened on 5 May 1925 and closed circa 1953. In October 1954, it was decided to relocate its buildings which were relocated to Holloways Beach to establish a school there (which opened in 1955). The present Woree State School opened in January 1980.

Saint Mary's College opened on 1 January 1986.

Woree State High School opened on 29 January 1985.

St Gerard Majella Catholic Primary School opened on 27 January 1988.

Cairns State Special School opened in 2017.

== Demographics ==
In the 2006 census, Woree had a population of 4,372 people.

In the 2016 census, Woree had a population of 4,821 people.

In the 2021 census, Woree had a population of 5,127 people.

== Education ==
Woree State School is a government primary (Prep-6) school for boys and girls at the corner of Rigg Street and Windarra Streets (16.9597°S 145.7413°E). In 2018, the school had an enrolment of 687 students with 56 teachers (51 full-time equivalent) and 37 non-teaching staff (27 full-time equivalent). It includes a special education program.

St Gerard Majella Primary School is a Catholic primary (Prep-6) school for boys and girls at 63 Anderson Road (16.9675°S 145.7403°E). In 2018, the school had an enrolment of 389 students with 28 teachers (21 full-time equivalent) and 20 non-teaching staff (14 full-time equivalent).

Cairns State Special School is a primary and secondary (Prep-12) school for boys and girls at Windarra Street (16.9631°S 145.7402°E). It provides individualised education to students with special needs. In 2018, the school had an enrolment of 63 students with 23 teachers (20 full-time equivalent) and 27 non-teaching staff (19 full-time equivalent).

Woree State High School is a government secondary (7–12) school for boys and girls at Rigg Street (16.9602°S 145.7418°E). In 2018, the school had an enrolment of 923 students with 88 teachers (82 full-time equivalent) and 54 non-teaching staff (44 full-time equivalent). It includes a special education program. T It has a SchoolTech campus at the Cairns TAFE campus in neighbouring Manunda for Years 11 and 12 students (16.9217°S 145.7543°E), allowing students to combine vocational education with senior secondary schooling.

St Mary's Catholic College is a Catholic secondary (7–12) school for boys and girls at 53 Anderson Road (16.9680°S 145.7410°E). In 2018, the school had an enrolment of 874 students with 70 teachers (67 full-time equivalent) and 53 non-teaching staff (40 full-time equivalent).

== Amenities ==
Woree Community Hall is on the south-west corner of Toogood Road and Jasper Street (16.95744°S 145.73724°E). It seats up to 80 people and is operated by the FNQ TPI Social Centre.

Southside Shopping Village is on Charlotte Close (16.9624°S 145.7449°E).

Cairns Golf Club has an 18-hole golf course and club hose on Links Drive in the east of the locality (16.9637°S 145.7477°E).

The Woree Sports and Aquatic Centre is on Pool Close (16.9630°S 145.7442°E). It has learn-to-swim classes and club with competitions for younger and masters swimmers.

Cannon Park is a horse racing track (16.9486°S 145.7461°E). It is home to the Cairns Jockey Club. It is a 1,800-metre (1.1 mi) track.

Cairns Coconut Caravan Park is at 23 Anderson Street (16.9686°S 145.7420°E).
