= Woree State School =

Location
- Cairns Qld; Australia
- Coordinates: 16.959759°S 145.741485°E

Information
- Principal: Mrs. Terry Davidson
- Grades: Prep to 6
- Website: woreess.eq.edu.au

Woree State School (WSS) is a public school situated in the southern suburb of Woree in Cairns, North Queensland, Australia. The school provides education from Prep to Year 6 and has around 900 students. It was opened in 1980.

Its motto is "Discover Strive Shine" and this replaced the school's original motto of "We Aim To Achieve" in 2009.
