= Woree State High School =

Location
- Cairns, Queensland; Australia; 16°57′39″S 145°44′29″E

Information
- Type: Public
- Motto: Quality & Equality
- Established: 1985
- Principal: Kathryn Todd
- Grades: 7–12
- Campus: Woree
- Colours: Maroon and white and black
- Website: woreeshs.eq.edu.au

Woree State High School (WSHS) is a public co-educational secondary school in Woree, Cairns, Queensland, Australia. It is administered by the Queensland Department of Education, with an enrolment of 822 students and a teaching staff of 74, as of 2023. The school serves students from Year 7 to Year 12.

== History ==
Woree State High School was built on an old sugar cane farm, along with the surrounding suburbs and construction on the school was started in 1984, with the school opening on 29 January 1985. At the time of the school opening, there were only 5 buildings within the school (A, B, C, D Blocks), with construction continuing until 1989 when all but two blocks (H and Community Centre) were completed. In 1992, another block was added to WSHS (H Block) and in 2007 the Community Centre was completed.

In 1999, 124 students participated in what was then considered 'the largest competition of its kind in the world'—the Australian Mathematics Competition for the Westpac Awards. Of these participants, two received high distinctions, 11 received distinctions, and 47 received credits."

In 2009, Brendan O’Connor, the Minister for Employment Participation, provided the school $98,000 to introduce a program "to engage Indigenous students in far north Queensland in science."

== Houses ==
The schools four sporting houses (Trojan, Gemini, Pindar & Apollo) are named after types of sugar cane, as a reminder of the history of the land.

== Community ==
The Woree State High School community is very multicultural, with many different cultural backgrounds. This is reflected in the many NAIDOC ceremonies, and at all formal events. Additionally, as part of Stage II of the Cairns Regional Gallery Mural Project, in 1996, an indigenous mural was added to the basketball stadium, which the artists wanted "to provide works indigenous pupils at the school could relate to and be proud of".

== See also ==
- List of schools in Far North Queensland
