= Cairns Western Arterial Road =

Road in Queensland, Australia

Cairns Western Arterial Road Queensland

General information
- Type: Road
- Length: 14.1 km (8.8 mi)
- Route number(s): State Route 91

Major junctions
- Southeast end: Bruce Highway (National Highway A1), Bungalow
- Pease Street; Redlynch Connection Road
- Northwest end: Captain Cook Highway (National Highway 1), Smithfield

Location(s)
- Major suburbs: Manoora, Whitfield, Kanimbla, Brinsmead, Redlynch, Kamerunga, Caravonica

The Cairns Western Arterial Road is a numbered state route in the Cairns Region of Queensland, Australia. The road provides a primary access route across the Brinsmead Gap for suburbs west of the Whitfield Range, and is one of two major crossings over the Barron River. In 2007, it was estimated that 24,000 vehicles per day used the road.

== Route ==
After proceeding north-west for 2.4 km from the Bruce Highway at Bungalow, the dual carriageway road alignment follows Reservoir Road west of a signalised intersection with Pease Street in the suburb of Manoora. A number of suburban streets connect directly to the arterial between here and Enmore Road. West of Enmore Road, the route rises over high terrain. A grade separated interchange provides access to McManus Street, Whitfield through this section. Beyond this point, access from some side streets is possible as the alignment passes Kanimbla and Brinsmead. Turning north from Brinsmead to follow the Redlynch Valley, the road becomes a single carriageway passing over the Kuranda Scenic Railway and through Kamerunga where it crosses the Barron River. North of the river, the arterial provides access to Caravonica before joining the Captain Cook Highway at a large roundabout adjacent to the Skyrail Rainforest Cableway terminal.

Plans exist to duplicate the road between Brinsmead and Caravonica, which would include the construction of two bridges and an overpass. Based on current capacity this upgrade is estimated to be complete by 2023, however a proposed 7,500 room resort and casino at Yorkeys Knob may require the upgrade to occur earlier due to increased traffic volumes associated with the development.

== Upgrades ==
=== Intersection upgrades ===
A project to upgrade the intersection with Harley Street, at a cost of $16.3 million, was completed in July 2021.

A project to investigate possible upgrades of the Loridan Drive intersection, at a cost of $550,000, was completed in December 2021.

=== Roadway duplication ===
A project to duplicate a section of the road, at a total cost of $300 million, completed its planning phase in November 2021. The design phase followed, with construction scheduled to start in late 2022.

== Major intersections ==
The entire road is in the Cairns local government area.

Location	km	mi	Destinations	Notes
Mooroobool, Westcourt, Bungalow border	0	0.0	Bruce Highway (National Highway A1) – southwest – Woree / northeast – Cairns CBD	Southern end of Cairns Western Arterial Road (State Route 91)
Manoora	2.4	1.5	Pease Street – north – Edge Hill	
Freshwater Creek	7.6	4.7	Bill Fulton Bridge	
Redlynch	8.1	5.0	Redlynch Connection Road – south – Redlynch	
Barron River	10.8– 10.9	6.7– 6.8	The Kamerunga Bridge	
Smithfield	14.1	8.8	Captain Cook Highway (National Highway 1) – north – Smithfield / southeast – Cairns CBD	Northern end of Cairns Western Arterial Road
1.000 mi = 1.609 km; 1.000 km = 0.621 mi
