= Kanimbla, Queensland =

Kanimbla
- Suburb
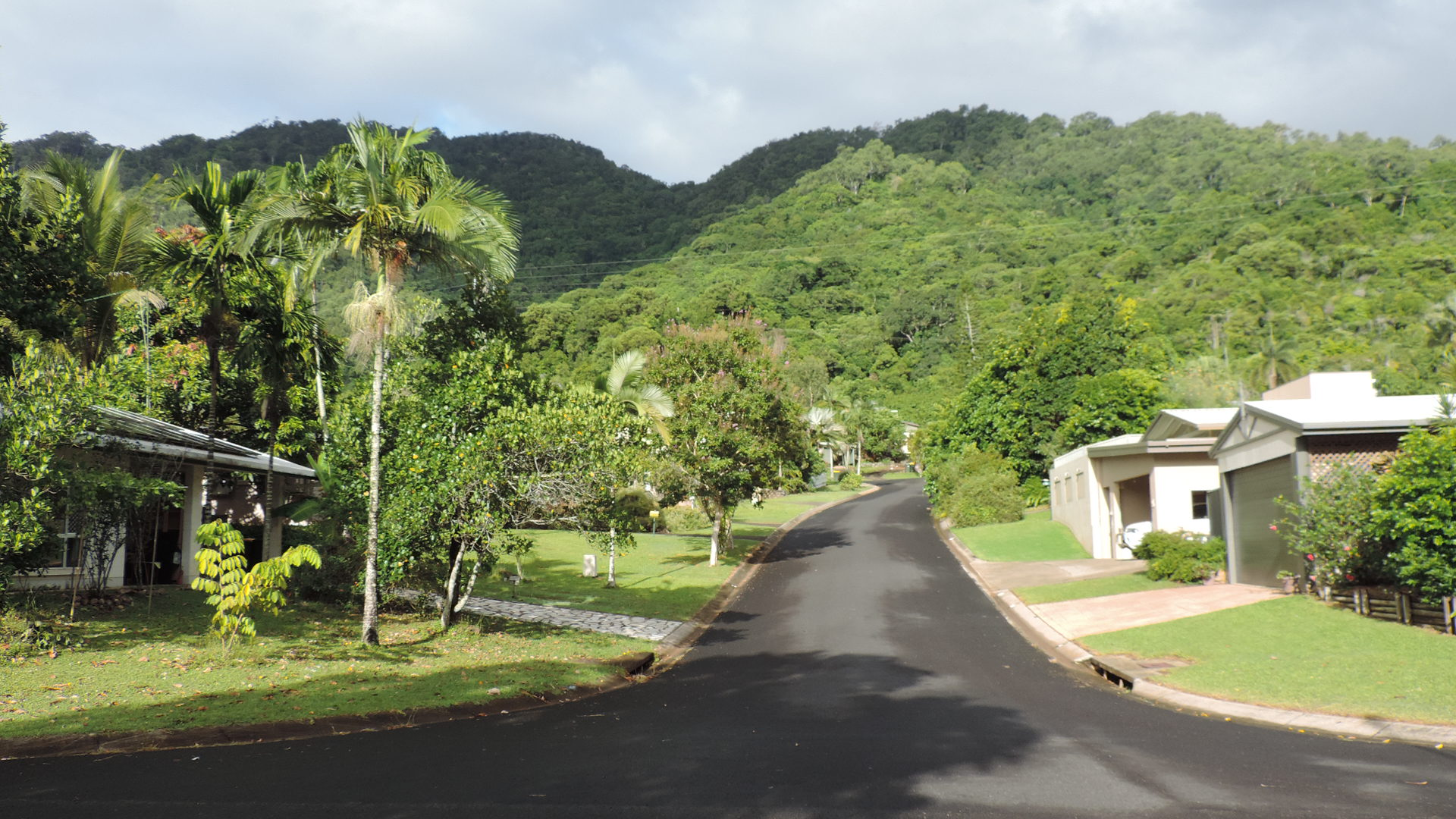
- Harrison Close looking west, 2018

- Interactive map of Kanimbla
- Coordinates: 16.9219°S 145.7208°E
- Country: Australia
- State: Queensland
- City: Cairns
- LGA: Cairns Region
- Location: 6.7 km (4.2 mi) W of Cairns CBD; 347 km (216 mi) NNW of Townsville; 1,679 km (1,043 mi) NNW of Brisbane
- Established: 1989

Government
  - State electorate: Cairns
  - Federal division: Leichhardt

Area
  - Total: 3.1 km^{2} (1.2 sq mi)

Population
  - Total: 2,827 (2021 census)
  - Density: 912/km^{2} (2,360/sq mi)
- Time zone: UTC+10:00 (AEST)
- Postcode: 4870
Suburbs around Kanimbla
Brinsmead	Whitfield	Manoora
Redlynch	Kanimbla	Manoora
Lamb Range	Mooroobool	Mooroobool

Kanimbla is a suburb of Cairns in the Cairns Region, Queensland, Australia. In the 2021 census, Kanimbla had a population of 2,827 people. It is home to the Cairns Baptist Church.

== Geography ==
Kanimbla is 6 km (3.7 mi) west of the city centre.

The suburb straddles the upper reaches of Moody's Creek and is bordered to the north by the Cairns Western Arterial Road (state route 91). The main road that goes through Kanimbla is Ramsey Drive. Along the middle of the northern boundary is Whites Gap. In the south west elevations reach heights greater than 500 m towards the summit of Mooroobool Peak.

== History ==
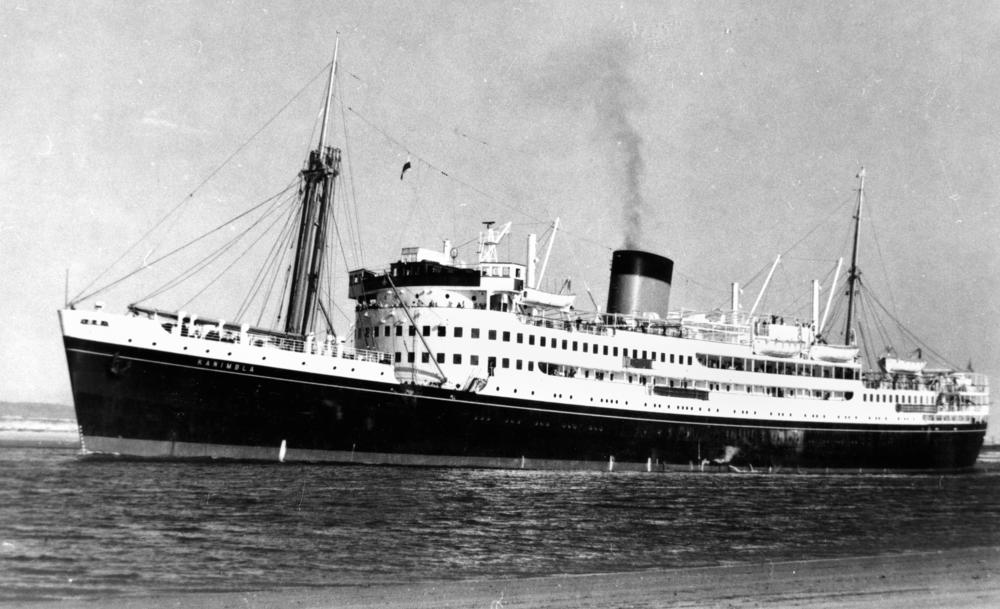
MV Kanimbla

Kanimbla is situated in the Yidinji traditional Aboriginal country.

On 11 February 1989, the suburb was created from land previously in Manoora and Mooroobool. The new suburb was named for the MV Kanimbla, a coastal passenger ship which had serviced Cairns before being pressed into military service during World War II (Manoora and Mooroobool also being the names of other coastal passenger ships). This ship again was named for the Kanimbla Valley, west of Blackheath in the Blue Mountains in New South Wales.

The Blue Mountains Library explains the origin of the name Kanimbla as follows:

A noticeable instance of this was the Kanimbla estate, an Aboriginal name derived from ‘kanim’, the head of one tribe, and ‘bula’, and the head of another, both of which roamed these valleys. [Kanimbla was the name of the local Aboriginal band of the Gundungurra tribe and apparently means camping or fighting ground]

Cairns Regional Council announced in 2013 that land had been purchased in Kanimbla to build a detention basin to alleviate seasonal flooding in suburbs downstream.

During the real estate hausse of the early 2000s the median price for a three bedroom house was $ 558,000 during the financial year 2020-21 and rose by the financial year 2025-26 to $ 816,000.

== Demographics ==
In the 2016 census, Kanimbla had a population of 2,670 people.

In the 2021 census, Kanimbla had a population of 2,827 people.

== Education ==
There are no schools in Kanimbla. The nearest government primary schools are Whitfield State School in neighbouring Whitfield to the north and Cairns West State School in Manunda to the east. The nearest government secondary school is Trinity Bay State High School in Manunda. There are also a number of non-government schools in nearby suburbs of Cairns.

== Attractions ==
Campbells Lookout is on Lake Morris Road, which leads to Copperlode Falls Dam. It offers views across the Cairns suburbs to the Cairns CBD and Trinity Bay beyond, and has acquired a reputation as a lovers' lane. There are three more lookouts on Lake Morris road. All of them are accessible from eight o'clock in the morning until eight o'clock in the evening.
