= Manoora, Queensland =

Manoora
- Suburb
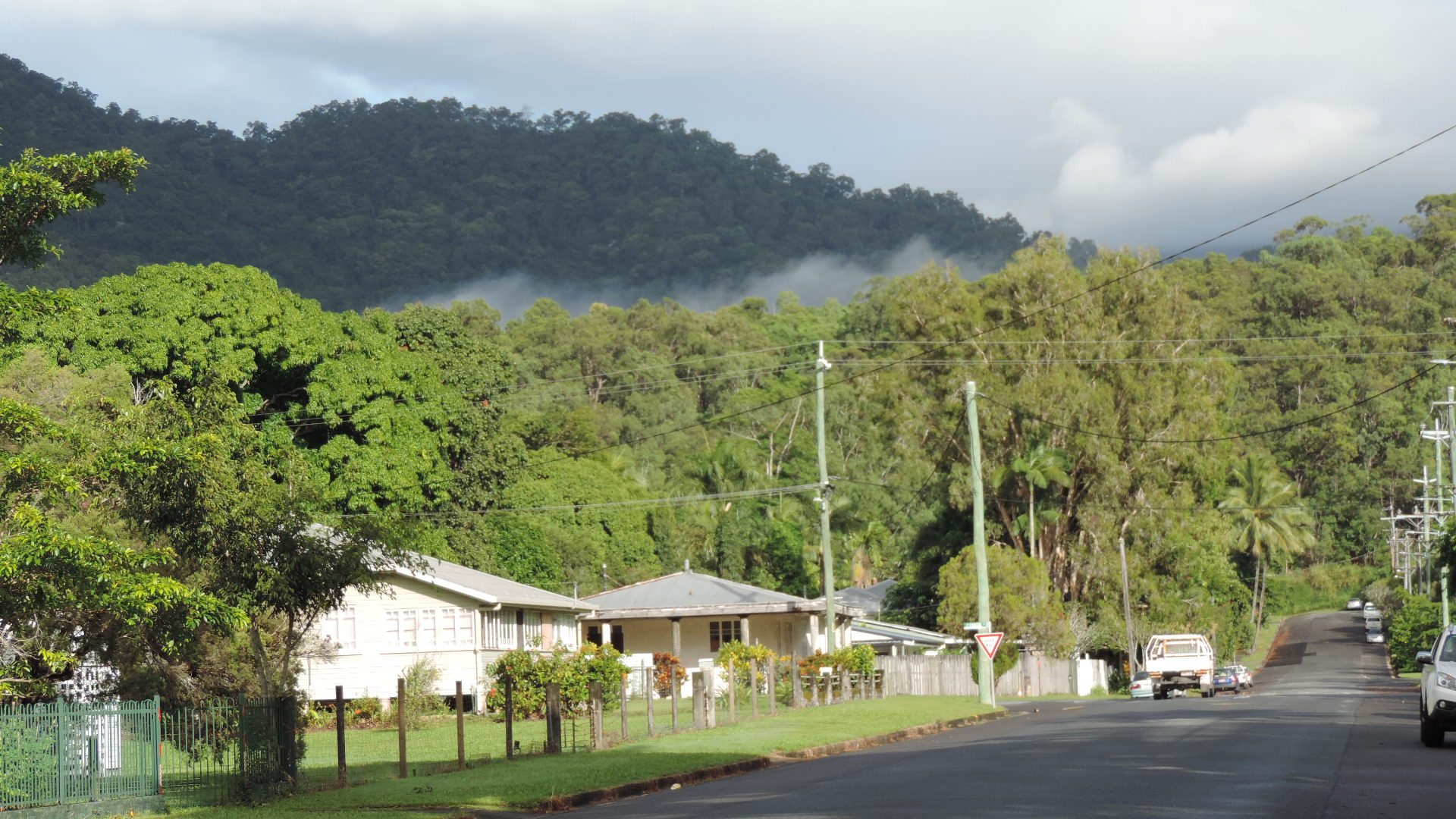
- Macilwraith Street, looking west, 2018

- Interactive map of Manoora
- Coordinates: 16.9186°S 145.7358°E
- Country: Australia
- State: Queensland
- City: Cairns
- LGA: Cairns Region
- Location: 4.0 km (2.5 mi) W of Cairns CBD; 346 km (215 mi) NNW of Townsville; 1,678 km (1,043 mi) NNW of Brisbane

Government
  - State electorate: Cairns
  - Federal division: Leichhardt

Area
  - Total: 2.2 km^{2} (0.85 sq mi)

Population
  - Total: 6,175 (2021 census)
  - Density: 2,810/km^{2} (7,270/sq mi)
- Time zone: UTC+10:00 (AEST)
- Postcode: 4870
Suburbs around Manoora
Whitfield	Edge Hill	Manunda
Kanimbla	Manoora	Manunda
Kanimbla	Mooroobool	Manunda

Manoora is a suburb of Cairns in the Cairns Region, Queensland, Australia. In the 2021 census, Manoora had a population of 6,175 people.

== Geography ==
Maroora is west of the Cairns city centre in Far North Queensland. It straddles the Cairns Western Arterial Road (state route 91).

== History ==
Manoora is situated in the Yidinji traditional Aboriginal country.

The suburb was established in 1975 from part of Parramatta Park and all of the area known as West Cairns.

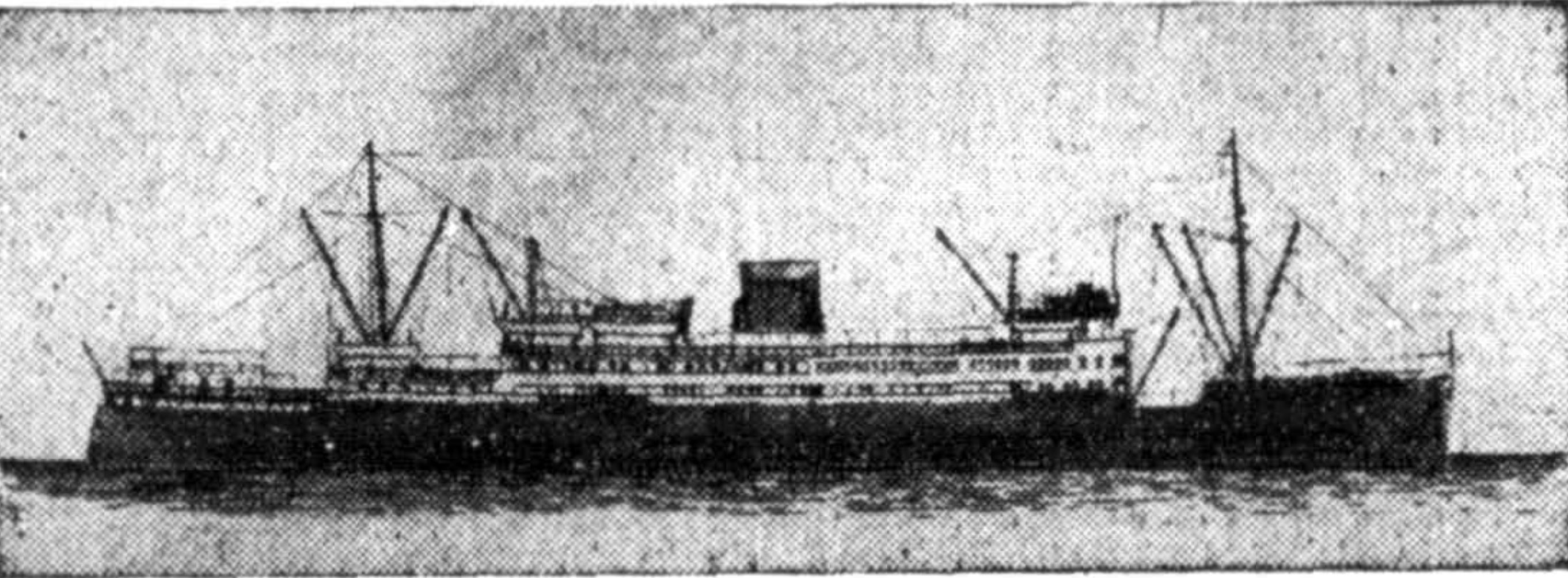
Profile picture of the Manoora, 1935

It was named after HMAS Manoora, which was in turn named after the town of Manoora in South Australia. The ship was built in Scotland in 1935 as a coastal steamer for the Adelaide Steamship Company and regularly visited Cairns, and entered service with the Royal Australian Navy in the World War II.

Pau Enterprises Indigenous Corporation was established in 2015 to manage and maintain the Pau family native title lands and interests on Darnley Island. It also seeks to create social enterprises on Darnley Island and other locations where community members have migrated to, such as Cairns. Their Cairns initiatives are organised from their Manoora office.

In 2012, the Non-State Schools Accreditation Board approved the application for Holy Spirit College to establish as a special assistance school. Assisted by funding of $9 million from the Queensland Government, construction commenced on the two sites in Manoora and Cooktown in July 2014. The Manoora campus opened at the start of the 2015 school year in the partly-built campus, full completion not being expected until July 2015.

== Demographics ==
In the 2011 census, Manoora had a population of 5,688 people.

In the 2016 census, Manoora had a population of 6,027 people.

In the 2021 census, Manoora had a population of 6,175 people with 24.4% describing their ancestry as English. This is followed by 22.8% describing their ancestry as Australian, 15.2% as Australian Aboriginal, and 13.6% as Torres Strait Islander. The largest ancestral proportion are Indigenous Australians at 28.8%. 63.3% of Manoora residents were born in Australia, with the next highest countries of birth being Papua New Guinea (2.9%), New Zealand (2.8%), England (2.3%), Philippines (1.6%) and Japan (1.5%). The top languages spoken at home other than English are Creole (2.6%), Japanese (1.8%), Yumplatok-Torres Strait Creole (1.7%), Punjabi (0.8%) and Mandarin (0.7%).

== Education ==
Holy Spirit College is a private secondary (7-12) campus of the Holy Spirit College headquartered at Cooktown. It is operated by Cairns Catholic Education Services. The Manoora campus is at 13 Moignard Street (16.9233°S 145.7355°E). The school is specifically to provide support for disengaged and marginalised young people. It offers enrolment as a day student at the Manoora campus, but there are also boarding options at the Cooktown campus.

There are no mainstream schools in Manoora. The nearest government primary schools are Cairns West State School in neighbouring Manunda to the south-east, Edge Hill State School in neighbouring Edge Hill to the north, and Whitfield State School in neighbouring Whitfield to the north-west. The nearest government secondary school is Trinity Bay State High School in neighbouring Manunda to the east.

== Amenities ==
Piccones Village is a shopping centre on Pease Street (16.9114°S 145.7403°E). It is operated by the Piccones family, a four-generation family of retailers in Cairns.

== Attractions ==
The Cairns Indigenous Art Centre is at 1 Jensen Street (16.9140°S 145.7407°E). It is operated by Umi Arts, an Indigenous organisation established in 2005, to preserve and protect the culture of Aboriginal and Torres Strait Islander people.
