= Edge Hill State School =

Location
- Cairns, Queensland; Australia
- Coordinates: 16.9063°S 145.74283°E

Information
- Type: Public state primary
- Motto: Honour and Labour
- Established: February 1940
- Principal: Jane Termaat
- Enrolment: ~900
- Campus: Edge Hill
- Colours: Maroon & gold
- Website: edgehillss.eq.edu.au

Edge Hill State School (EHSS) is a government primary school in Pease Street, Edge Hill, Cairns, Queensland, Australia. It is located approximately 8 kilometres (5.0 mi) from the Cairns CBD and provides public education to children living within the suburbs of Edge Hill, Manunda and Cairns North.

== Overview ==
The school is located along Pease Street on low-lying land immediately backing on to remnant Cairns central swamp, first reserved by the State of Queensland to be a State School on 17 December 1938

Location (maroon & gold) selected for Edge Hill State School back in 1939 - note watercourses and swamps

The school was built to service school aged children then living in a small, newly emergent rural township that had been forming along the higher edges of low lying, swampy lands progressively being transformed into market gardens, dairy paddocks and cane fields

The emergent township was locally known as Edge Hill, and this, then, became the name of the new 'Edge Hill' state school. It started as a single classroom, three verandahs, two earth toilets, eight school desks, 40 hat and coat hooks, 31 students, and a single "Acting Head Teacher".

Seventy years on from its beginnings as land reserved for a State school, it still immediately backs on to remnant Cairns central swamp, but is now located next to a large water drain, within the suburbs of Cairns, with student numbers capped by the Queensland Department of Education at just over 900.

It has:

- multiple buildings and facilities (including shops, covered assembly, library, internet technology facilities, music rooms, environmental interpretive centre, swimming pool, swimming club, after school care, plus dental centre);
- 37 class room teachers, plus 6 specialist teachers (including teachers in the fields of Music, Health & Physical Education, Resource Education, Languages other than English, Enhanced Learning, plus Special Education); and
- a full-time administration consisting of one Principal, two Deputy Principals, a Business Services manager, and 3 permanent administrative staff.

== School Environment ==
=== Swampy Golf Course (1930s) ===
The slightly raised area within the Cairns central swamps reserved for a school, upon which the Edge Hill State School was built, had originally been used by local Edge Hill residents as a golf course (since abandoned because of constant flooding and inundation),.

The area was identified as a prospective site for a school by District Inspector of Schools, Mr C Walton who in 1938 reported to a Department of Public Instruction Advisory Committee identifying three possible sites for a school, making the following comments about the site and its environs:

Photo of remnant Cairns central swamp, looking eastwards from Edge Hill schoolgrounds

".. a swamp extends along the western side of Pease Street, and ..[to the immediate east] .. is a swamp. These two swamps are connected by a water-course which passes ..[to the immediate south]. Thus this area has low-lying land on the east, south and west..."

"Mosquitoes breed prolifically in the stagnant water of the swamps and the land mentioned is approximately three (3) feet only above swamp water level"

The Department of Public Instruction reserved the site for the school on the understanding the then Cairns City Council had plans to drain the swampy areas, and because it was the only one of the three possible sites identified that could be procured for school purposes "..without the expenditure of a considerable sum [of money]..".

=== Horse paddock (1940s) ===
During the early 1940s teachers would catch a bus from Cairns City to a small shop, then, on most days, walk along a sandy, unsealed road to school. Pupils would walk, ride bicycles, or take horses along tracks through the surrounding 'bush'

On rainy days the school grounds would become inundated, and the creek to the immediate south (Saltwater Creek) would flood. One of the teachers, Daphne Jewell, recalled.

"..after rain [we] had to paddle across a creek between the bus stop and the school, much to the delight of the kiddies who paddled across with us."

Some classes were held under the school, and once, during such a wet period, Mr Edward Gordon, the Head Teacher at the time wrote:

"All of the verandahs are soaking wet from the driving rain, and the water is lying in pools under the school, where the children are sitting at their desks...A good percentage of the children are suffering from colds which, I consider, are caused by the damp concrete they have underfoot"

The grounds reserved for the school were not fully fenced and were, in fact, more paddock than school yard: at night cows and horses 'camped' in the school grounds; each school morning teachers cleaned up after the cows and horses; and during the days the pupils' horses would join the others, often while classes were being conducted in the shade of some large trees that've long since been removed and cleared away for cricket pitches and sports fields

=== Snakes, trees, and waterlillies (1950s) ===
By the 1950s the school grounds were emerging as a 'cared for' social space amidst a lot of surrounding 'uncared for' space.

"I recall the many snakes which frequented the playground. Greenslopes Street was an uncared for space adjoining the school hemmed in by Pease Street and the swamp. There was always an effort to beautify the school grounds and a number of trees were planted to do just that"

The street on to which the school fronted (Pease Street) was a sandy, unsealed road, and the street that theoretically ran along the school's northern border (Russell Street) was no more than a name on a map and didn't exist.

Huge old trees were growing where there is now a 'swamp' fence(under which the pupils 'parked' their bicycles); there was an old tree by Saltwater Creek on Pease Street where pupils feuded and played, and there were "lovely waterlillies" in what is now a large drain.

=== Bushland (1960s) ===
At the beginning of the 1960s, Mr Kevin Whouley, starting his first term as Principal, moved into a Principal's residence within the Edge Hill School grounds.

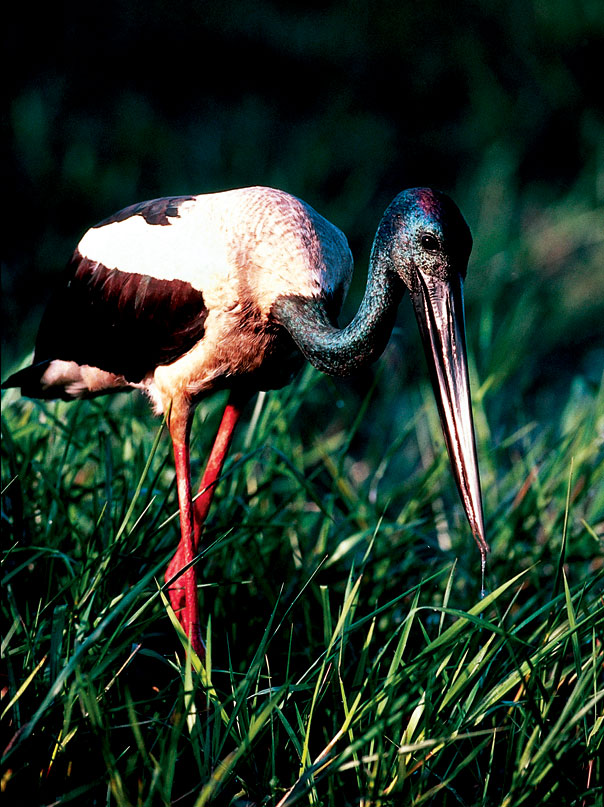
Photo of a Jabiru (courtesy of Tourism NT at www.travelnt.com)

Whouley described the School environs at the time, as follows:

"The school .. gave the appearance of being out in the bushland as it was bordered by scrub and swamp on the northern and eastern boundaries. To the south was the creek and to the west, across Pease Street, was a tangle of ti-trees, stunted growth and thick blady grass.. At night the curlews called incessantly and in the early morning scrub wallabies came in to graze on the sports field."

"In the dry weather a lone Jabiru came yearly to stand motionless for hours in the lower paddock. Snakes including death adders were plentiful. A dairy farm adjoined the school. The cows in search of pasture, made tracks along the school's fence. At certain times of the year the areas where cows had been, produced enormous crops of delicious mushrooms"

== School Community ==
=== School Building Committee (1930s) ===
Local parents and residents were concerned about their children having to walk 2 kilometres (1.2 mi) or more from home to school, crossing the then busy (and dangerous) Kuranda railway line each day. They ultimately secured State Government agreement and assistance to build a State school at Edge Hill.

Working through the Edge Hill Progress Association, their Secretary (Mr C.K.V Edwards) on 18 September 1937, wrote to the local member of parliament, Mr J. O'Keefe, asking for assistance to establish a State school.

On 6 December 1937, their President (Mr E. H. D. Hawkins) convened a meeting of all interested parents and local residents to form a school building committee to oversee and coordinate their efforts to obtain the desired State school.

With the strong support and assistance of the local member of Parliament, this School Building Committee:

- on 1 March 1938 made formal application to the then Director of Public Instruction for a State School to be built at Edge Hill;
- on 14 May 1938 successfully arranged a meeting at the Edge Hill Town Hall between a Department of Public Instruction District Inspector (Mr C. Walton) and prospective pupils plus their parents;
- by 1939 obtained formal advice and confirmation from then Director of Education to the effect that:

i. it had been agreed a state school should be established at Edge Hill, preferably on an otherwise swampy portion of land the City of Cairns planned to drain

ii. an area of 5 acres, 3 roods, 12 perches (2.357 hectares) fronting on to Pease Street had been reserved for the purpose of building the Edge Hill State School.

Having achieved its purpose the School Building Committee was by July 1940 dissolved, having seen the School built and opened; secured a permanent Head Teacher for the school; arranged for flood prone depressions to be filled; and obtained Department of Public Works approval to fence and prevent cattle and horses wandering the school grounds.

=== World War II School Committee (1940s) ===
With the dissolution of the original School Building Committee (above), the Department of Public Instruction directed the Head Teacher to form a new school committee.

Two years after the start of the school, in April 1942 the Department of Public Instruction also directed the Head Teacher to close the school to all pupils below grade 6. This direction was given as, by this time, in the ongoing war that had started in 1939, Japan had almost totally conquered South-East Asia and was rapidly moving southward towards Australia, already flying planes over Australian waters and bombing naval bases around Darwin.

The Edge Hill parents and citizens objected to the directed school closure, and through their School Committee (Chaired by Mr A. Loveland) wrote in protest to the Minister of Public Instruction giving reasons why Edge Hill State School should NOT be closed as directed.

The parents and citizens also arranged a working bee which was held on 10 April 1942 to construct over 61 m of timber-lined trenches within the school yard, and, with these trenches in place, they kept the school open. The School Committee preferred to keep children safe at school (where they did lessons by correspondence) rather than have them roaming freely and unsupervised around Edge Hill and surrounds.

One of the Edge Hill State School pupils at the time (Nola Downey) recalled:

"In those days we were only able to attend school for half a day... The greatest excitement .. was the Air-raid practices which we had very often. The siren would whine loudly and threateningly and we would all scuttle off to our slit trenches and stand huddled together with a cork between our teeth and cotton wool in our ears" (Page 24)

By keeping the school open the total number of pupils attending the school in 1942 leapt upwards to about 230, with the school picking up pupils from the nearby, closed North Cairns and Good Counsel Convent Schools. All 230 pupils had to share the one single classroom, which was achieved by staggering the times pupils were required to attend.

=== Garden Party Parents Committee (1950s) ===
At the beginning of the 1950s a School Committee officially existed but wasn't functioning. The School was consequently operating only on those core resources the State provided, and the teaching aides available to the teachers were both basic and scarce

One of the teachers at the time, Mona Lavery, recalls how mothers and parents came to the school's rescue when, in 1951:

"..our teaching aides .. were so scarce we persuaded Mr Hagen [the Head Teacher] to let us, the teachers, hold a garden party to raise some funds... Some of the hard working and keen mothers willingly gave a hand on a cake stall .. we had a folk dancing display...That garden party was the incentive that sparked off bigger and brighter fund raising activities and the parents formed a great committee which set up Edge Hill as one of the best equipped schools in Queensland.."

Some of the members of the parents committee formed included Mr Tom Roy, Mr Jack Woodward, Mr Don Kraft and Mr B. Courtney.

=== Parents Committee and Ladies Auxiliary (1960s) ===
By the beginning of the 1960s the school was still bordered with "scrub and swamp" to its north, "scrub and swamp" to its east, a dirt drain (or creek) to the south, plus a tangle of ti-trees, stunted growths, and blady grass across the road, to the west

At this time the then Principal of the School (Mr Kevin Whouley) recalls:

"Edge Hill, in those days, was mainly occupied by professional and business folk ... The school was [thus] blessed .. by a very active committee of parents led by Jim Lyons with the assistance of Norma Alexander who was President of the Ladies Auxiliary. Jim and Norma were determined that the school would want for nothing and their efforts were crowned with success"

The parents at this time built a model train capable of carrying about 40 children, which the Parent's Committee transported all around the region to offer rides and raise money sufficient to build two concrete tennis courts.

== School facilities ==
=== Original building (1939) ===
Front View Design Drawing of original EHSS school building, 1940

Following original agreement from the Queensland Director of Education to build a school at Edge Hill a notice was placed in the Queensland Government Gazette on 22 July 1939 calling for tenders to build the school, and by September 1939 it was announced that Mr V. A. Mazlin had won the tender.

The school was classed by the then Department of Public Works as a "Sectional Type School, One (1) class room", lifted off the ground on stilts, with front entry steps leading up into a verandah running along three sides of the building (2.44 m wide) and a single doorway into a single classroom (6.39 m long x 5.49 m wide).

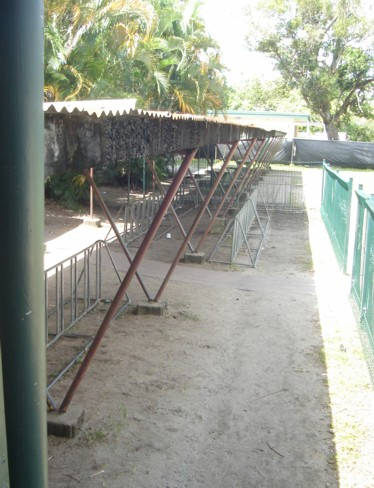
Photo of Edge Hill Schools covered bike shed (April 2008)

=== Bicycle shelter (1960s) ===
The Parents Committee and Ladies Auxiliary of the early 1960s worked to raise the monies necessary to build a covered bicycle shelter where students attending the school parked their bikes almost 50 years (finally pulled down in 2009).

=== Concrete tennis courts (1960s) ===
During the early 1960s two concrete tennis courts were built on the school grounds for the school students (since been replaced with basketball courts).

The monies to pay for the construction of these tennis courts was raised by parents, primarily by building a model train on which children (or their parents) could pay for rides.

=== Cricket pitches (1960s) ===
Two concrete cricket pitches were laid the school's oval during the 1960s, the costs of construction of which were almost exclusively funded by the parents Committee and Ladies Auxiliary of the day.

== School fundraising and fetes ==
=== Garden party (1950s) ===
It was during the 1950–1960 decade that the school held its first fund raising fetes, with the very first being in the form a 'Garden Party' held one Friday afternoon in 1951. This first fetes has been captured and recorded in an early film made about the school and school life at that time

One account of the 'Garden Party' ete (the first of many to follow is as follows

"Mr Hagen [the Head Teacher] .. let us, the teachers, hold a garden party to raise some funds. He was most sceptical and doubtful of any success but as he felt the school badly needed a wheelbarrow he grudgingly gave his consent to an afternoon garden party, a Friday it was ..

"..there was an iced cake raffle at 6d. a ticket, we had a folk dancing display, a parade of decorated bicylcles, we had cautiously ordered a dozen bottles of softdrink.. and that completed the party. I can picture Mr Hagen . .counting the spoils gleefully - 48 pounds. He had enough for a wheelbarrow, and a small radio costing 34 pounds was purchased for the grade ones.."

=== Annual flower show (1960s) ===
During the 1960s, the parents and citizens arranged and held an annual flower show and fete for Edge Hill School, on the Edge Hill School grounds. This flower show and fete was one of the parent and citizen's best fund raisers.

=== Parent contribution envelopes (1960s-1970s) ===
Through the 1960s and 1970s the parents and citizen's committee worked with the school to distribute to (and collect from) students small yellow envelopes into which parents were expected to place cash contributions.

== School Principals ==
=== Principals (1940s) ===
"When I first arrived at Edge Hill it was a one room building with approximately 20 children but as the town of Edge Hill grew, the attendance grew .. I would say Edge Hill, my first school, was the happiest period of my teaching career as a principal" Mr Edward GORDON (1941–1949)

The School's first 'Head Teachers' were, in order:

- Alexander Lennox SEATON (5 February – 14 June 1940)
- Michael FRAWLEY (Acting) (18 June – 7 October 1940)
- James Fredrick BROCON (8 October 1940 – 20 April 1941)
- Edward Albert GORDON (2 June 1941 – 30 June 1949)

=== Principals (1950s) ===
"I must say that I enjoyed being there [Edge Hill State School], and found the children and parents a very pleasant lot...I can remember .. attendance increased while I was there, and I finished up teaching my classes under the school which wasn't very satisfactory." Mr George HAGAN (1949–1952)

During the decade 1950 to 1960, the School had two principals as follows

- George Edward HAGAN (1 July 1949 – 17 August 1952)
- Norman Fredrick DANIELS (18 July 1952 – 24 June 1960)

=== Principals (1960s) ===
"Mr C.P Cullen [1965–1969] was farewelled by parents, teachers and about 600 pupils when he left Edge Hill State School .. Highlight of the ceremony was the presentation of a scroll. The scroll bearing the words "To Sir, with Love" under the Edge Hill school crest had been made by the pupils .. bearing over 590 separate messages, is over 60 feet (18 m) long."

The Schools principals during the decade, 1960 to 1970, were as follows:

- Kevin Claude Michael WHOULEY (25 July 1960 – 1965)
- Charles Phillip CULLEN (1965–1969)
- Fredrick Walter WHITE (Acting) (1969)

=== Principals (1970s) ===
"This was a time of continuing expansion for Edge Hill, with enrolments approaching 600 - a Class I School. ...[It] was a happy school, and a progressive one without losing touch with the reality that there are certain basic structures the education of children demands...It is said a school is a reflection of its Principals, and when three successive Principals were named Whoulley, Cullen, and Hankey, the state of the school .. is something to ponder, and for the individual to pass judgment." Mr Ian HANKEY (1969–1975)

School Principals for the decade, 1970–1980, were as follows:

- Ian Salisbury HANKEY (1969 – 31 December 1974)
- Kevin Claude Michael WHOULEY (1 January 1975 – 29 September 1978)
- Fredrick Walter WHITE (Acting) 29 September 1978 – 1 January 1979)

=== Principals (1980s) ===
During the decade, 1980–1990, the School has the following Principals:

- Kevin William ROSS (1 January 1979 – 3 November 1988)
- Kenneth Mervyn BOWLES (1 January 1988 – 15 August 1988)

=== Principals (1990s) ===
Principals at the school during 1990–2000 includes:

- Robert David BELL

=== Principals (2000s) ===
Although the school has existed since 1940 it has rejuvenated itself in recent years...This change has been facilitated through extensive investment and support of teachers in the use of learning technology. .. Ms Susan Darby (2005–2007) had come from working in distance education and helped lead the school through its period of change, with its increasing emphasis on computer learning technologies

From 2000 to the present, School Principals include:

- Susan DARBY
- Paul CAMPBELL
- Jane TERMAAT

== See also ==
- List of schools in Far North Queensland
- History of Cairns
