= Whitfield, Queensland =

Whitfield
- Suburb
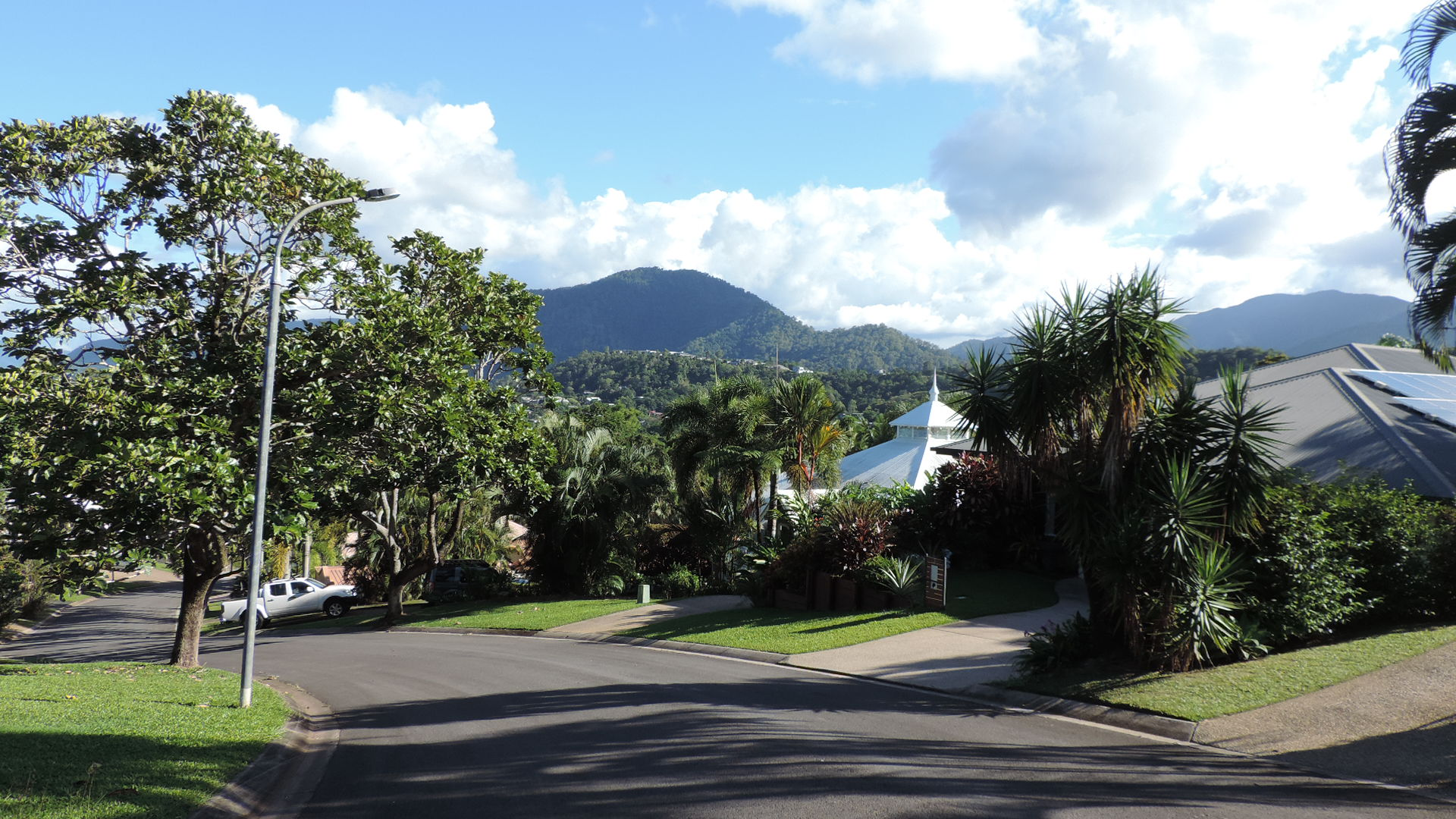
- Looking south on Gloucester Street in the residential area, 2018

- Interactive map of Whitfield
- Coordinates: 16.9016°S 145.7280°E
- Country: Australia
- State: Queensland
- City: Cairns
- LGA: Cairns Region
- Location: 5.4 km (3.4 mi) NW of Cairns CBD; 349 km (217 mi) NNW of Townsville; 1,681 km (1,045 mi) NNW of Brisbane

Government
  - State electorate: Cairns
  - Federal division: Leichhardt

Area
  - Total: 6.0 km^{2} (2.3 sq mi)

Population
  - Total: 4,262 (2021 census)
  - Density: 710/km^{2} (1,840/sq mi)
- Time zone: UTC+10:00 (AEST)
- Postcode: 4870
Suburbs around Whitfield
Stratford	Stratford	Aeroglen
Brinsmead	Whitfield	Edge Hill
Kanimbla	Mooroobool	Manoora

Whitfield is a suburb of Cairns in the Cairns Region, Queensland, Australia. In the 2021 census, Whitfield had a population of 4,262 people.

== Geography ==
Whitfield has the following mountains:

- Lumley Hill 325 metres (1,066 ft)
- Mount Whitfield 365 metres (1,198 ft)

The southern portion of Whitfield is developed as residential land rising from sea level to about 50m up the slopes of Mount Whitfield. The northern part of the suburb is undeveloped bushland within the Mount Whitfield Conservation Park, which occupies the upper slopes of Mount Whitfield which rises to 350m.

== History ==
Whitfield is situated in the Yidinji traditional Aboriginal country.

It was named by the Queensland Place Names Board on 1 September 1973 as a locality after Mount Whitfield, which was named by the explorer, public servant and politician George Elphinstone Dalrymple on 17 October 1873 after Edwin Whitfield, a storekeeper and merchant from Cardwell. After an adjustment of the boundaries in 2001 it was elevated to a suburb by 7 June 2002.

Whitfield State School opened on 23 January 1989.

== Demographics ==
- In the 2011 census, Whitfield had a population of 4,176 people.
- In the 2016 census, Whitfield had a population of 4,275 people.
- In the 2021 census, Whitfield had a population of 4,262 people.

== Heritage listings ==
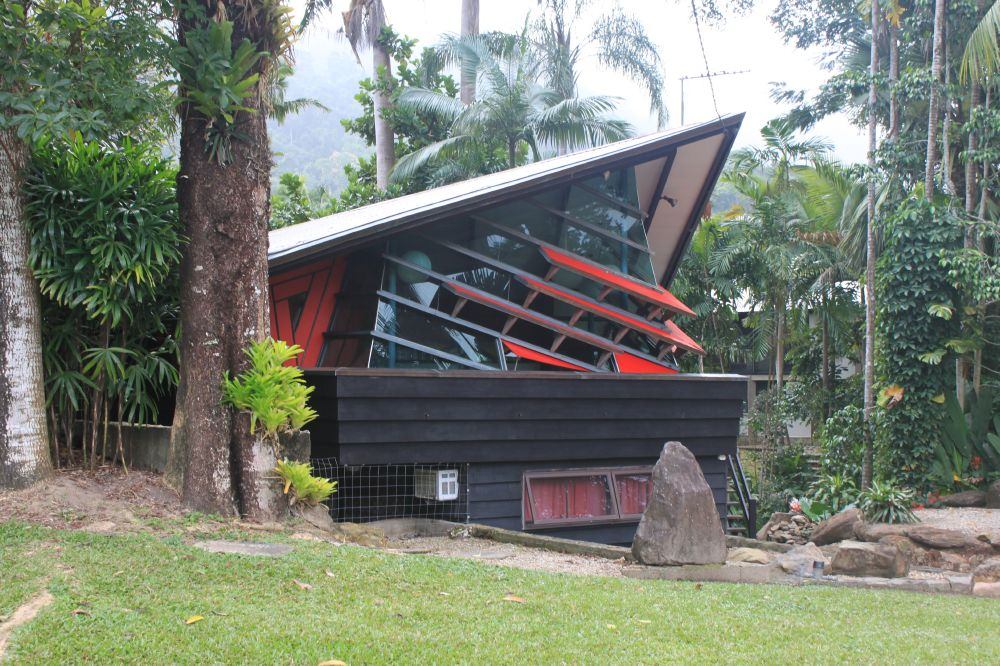
Oribin Studio, 2012

Whitfield has heritage listings including:

- Oribin Studio, 16 Heavey Crescent

== Education ==
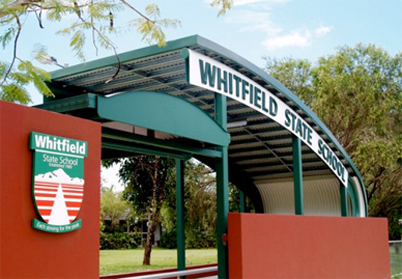
School gate, Whitfield State School, circa 2022

Whitfield State School is a government primary (Prep-6) school for boys and girls at 42-74 McManus Street. In 2018, the school had an enrolment of 831 students with 64 teachers (60 full-time equivalent) and 38 non-teaching staff (25 full-time equivalent). It includes a special education program.

There are no secondary schools in Whitfield. The nearest government secondary schools are Trinity Bay State High School in Manunda to the south-east and Cairns State High School in Cairns North to the east.

== Amenities ==
Whitfield has no centre as such. There are three shops at the roundabout at Woodward Street corner Heavey Crescent. There is a building looking like a church in not far from there in Heavey Street called Whitfield Chapel, or just The Chapel. It was created in 1996 as wedding venue for Japanese tourists. After it served for many years as office for real estate agencies it was returned to its function as wedding venue in 2025.

There are a number of parks in the area:

- Colin Penridge Park
- Murchison Street Park
- Ross Allen Park

== Gallery ==
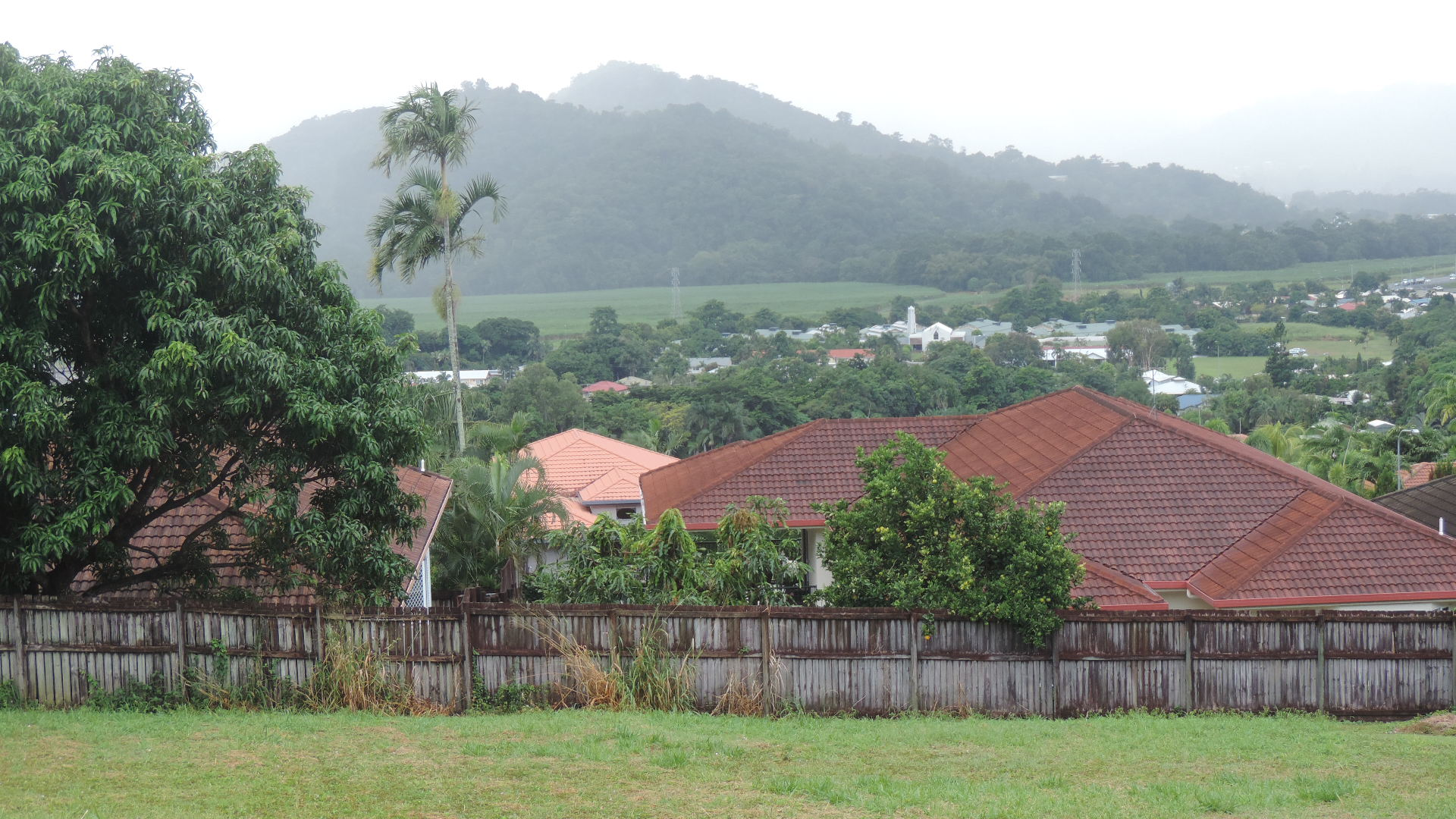
View from Darlingia Close, Redlynch, across the suburb of Redlynch towards Mount Whitfield, 2018

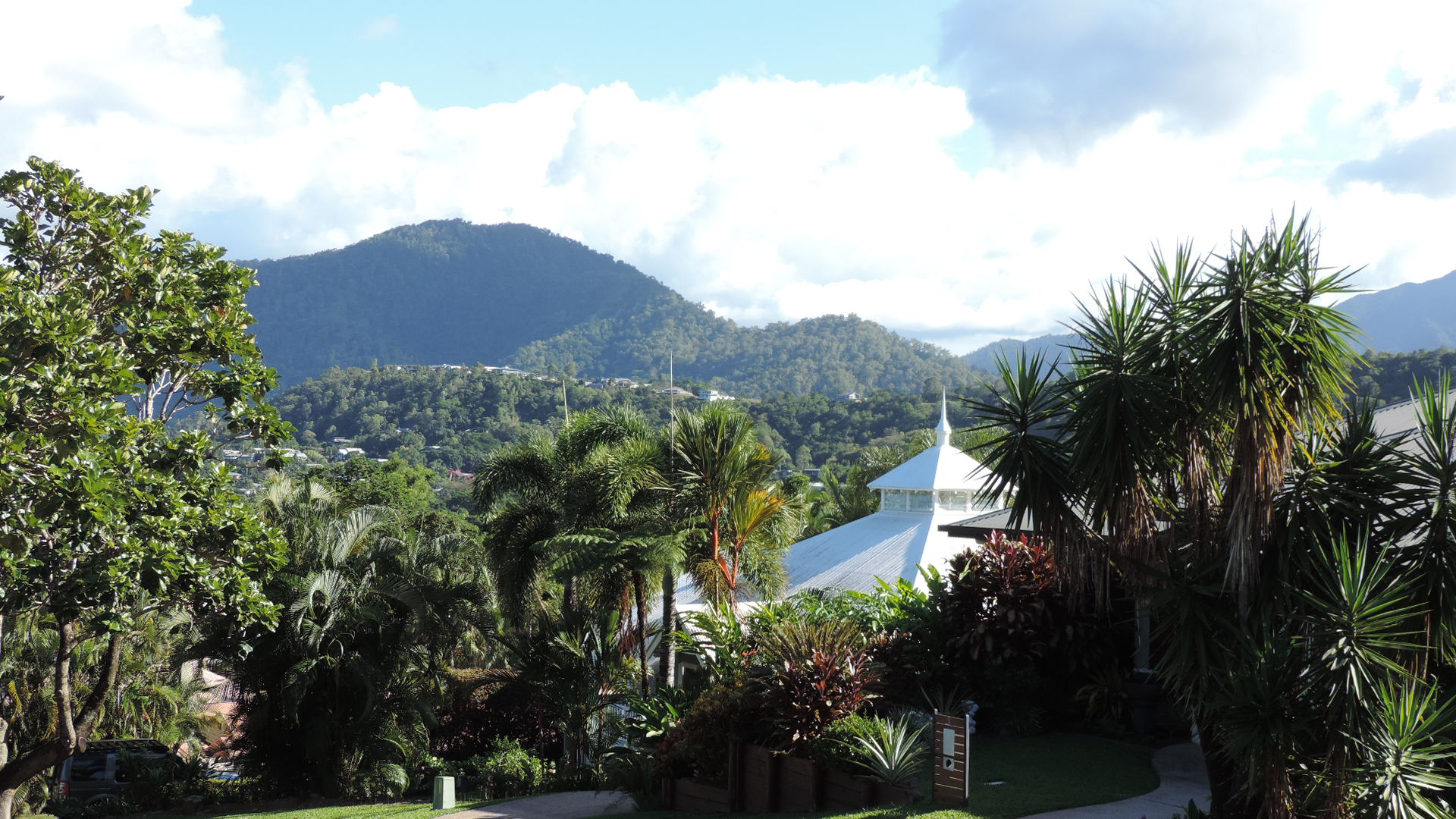
Looking south on Gloucester Street, Whitfield, 2018
