= Westcourt, Queensland =

Westcourt Cairns, Queensland
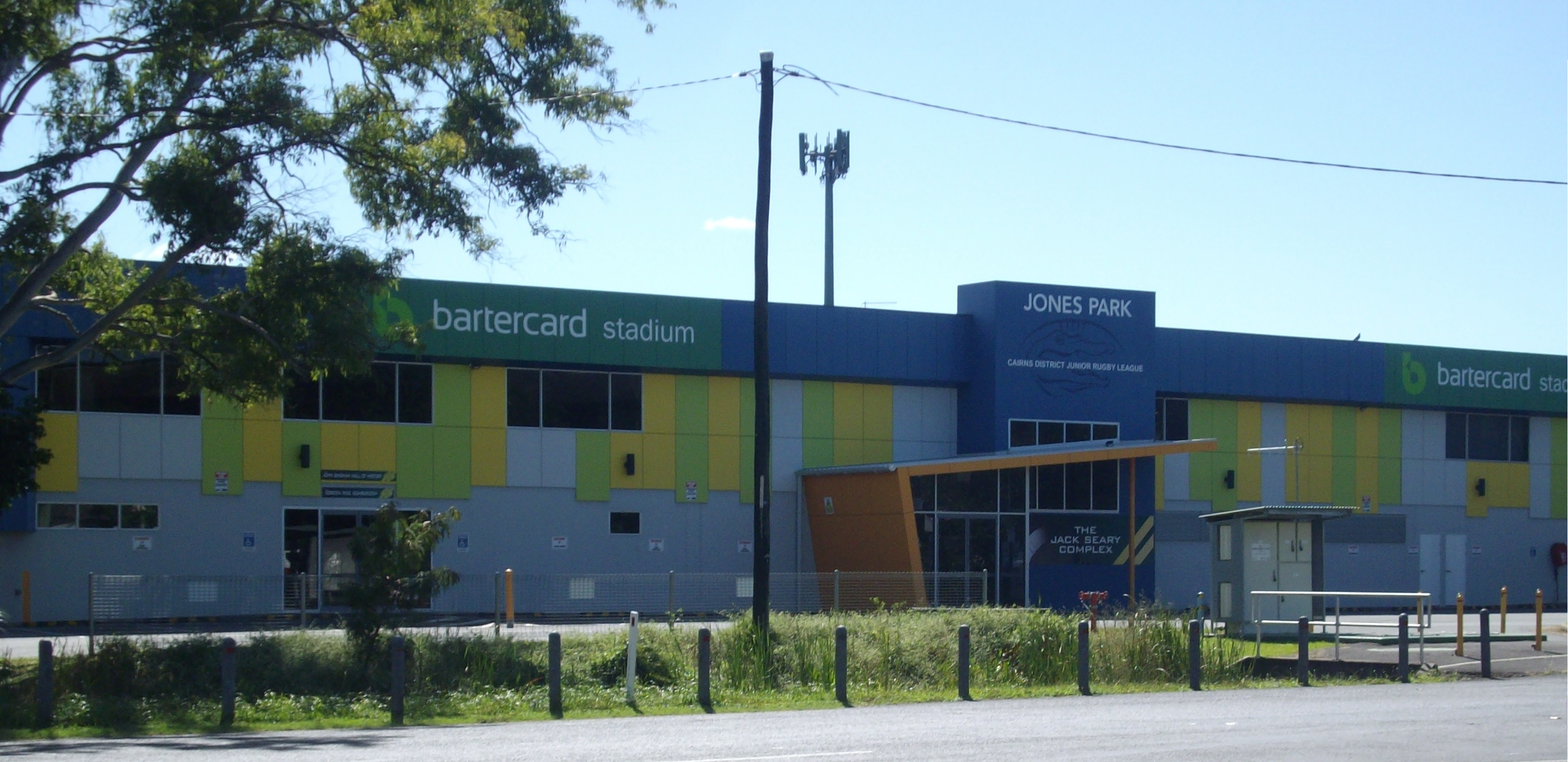
- Jones Park sporting facilities

- Coordinates: 16.93°S 145.7530°E
- Population: 3,841 (2021 census)
  - Density: 2,400/km^{2} (6,220/sq mi)
- Postcode(s): 4870
- Area: 1.6 km^{2} (0.6 sq mi)
- Time zone: AEST (UTC+10:00)
- Location: 3.4 km (2 mi) SW of Cairns CBD; 345 km (214 mi) NNW of Townsville; 1,680 km (1,044 mi) NNW of Brisbane
- LGA(s): Cairns Region
- State electorate(s): Cairns
- Federal division(s): Leichhardt
Suburbs around Westcourt:
| Manunda | Manunda | Parramatta Park |
| Manunda | Westcourt | Bungalow |
| Mooroobool | Bungalow | Bungalow |

Westcourt is a suburb of Cairns in the Cairns Region, Queensland, Australia. In the 2021 census, Westcourt had a population of 3,841 people.

== Geography ==
The suburb is bounded:

- to the south-east by Mulgrave Road (which is part of the Bruce Highway, which connects Brisbane to Cairns)
- to the south-west by McCoombe Street, Givens Street, and Dillon Street
- to the north-west by Lennon Street, Tills Street and Gatton Street
- to the north-east by Fearnley Street and a drain

Westcourt is flat low-lying land, less than 10 metres (33 ft) above sea level. It is predominantly developed as residential housing.

== History ==
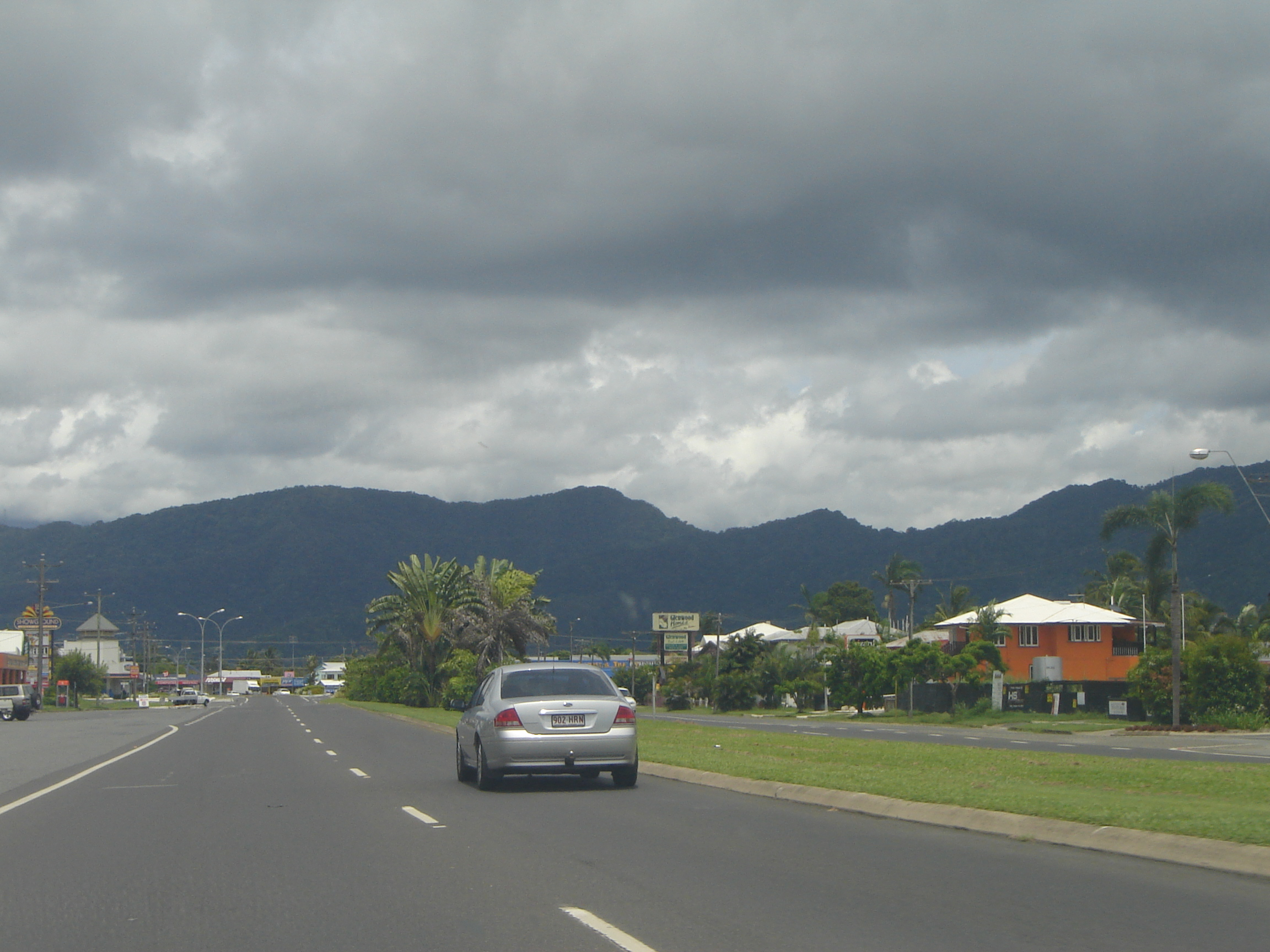
Mulgrave Road with Westcourt to the right and Mount Sheridan in the distance, 2006

Westcourt is situated in the Yidinji traditional Aboriginal country.

The land of which Westcourt is situated was initially a dairy farm, which was subdivided in 1886. Westcourt, located east of the suburb Mooroobool, was named as a locality on 1 September 1973 and designated as a suburb on 7 June 2002.

Local sportsground, Jones Park, is named after two brothers Jack Jones and Henry Ernest (Harry) Jones. In 1966, the Jones brothers donated their land to the Cairns District Junior Rugby League.

== Demographics ==
In the 2016 census, Westcourt had a population of 3,918 people.

In the 2021 census, Westcourt had a population of 3,841 people.

== Amenities ==
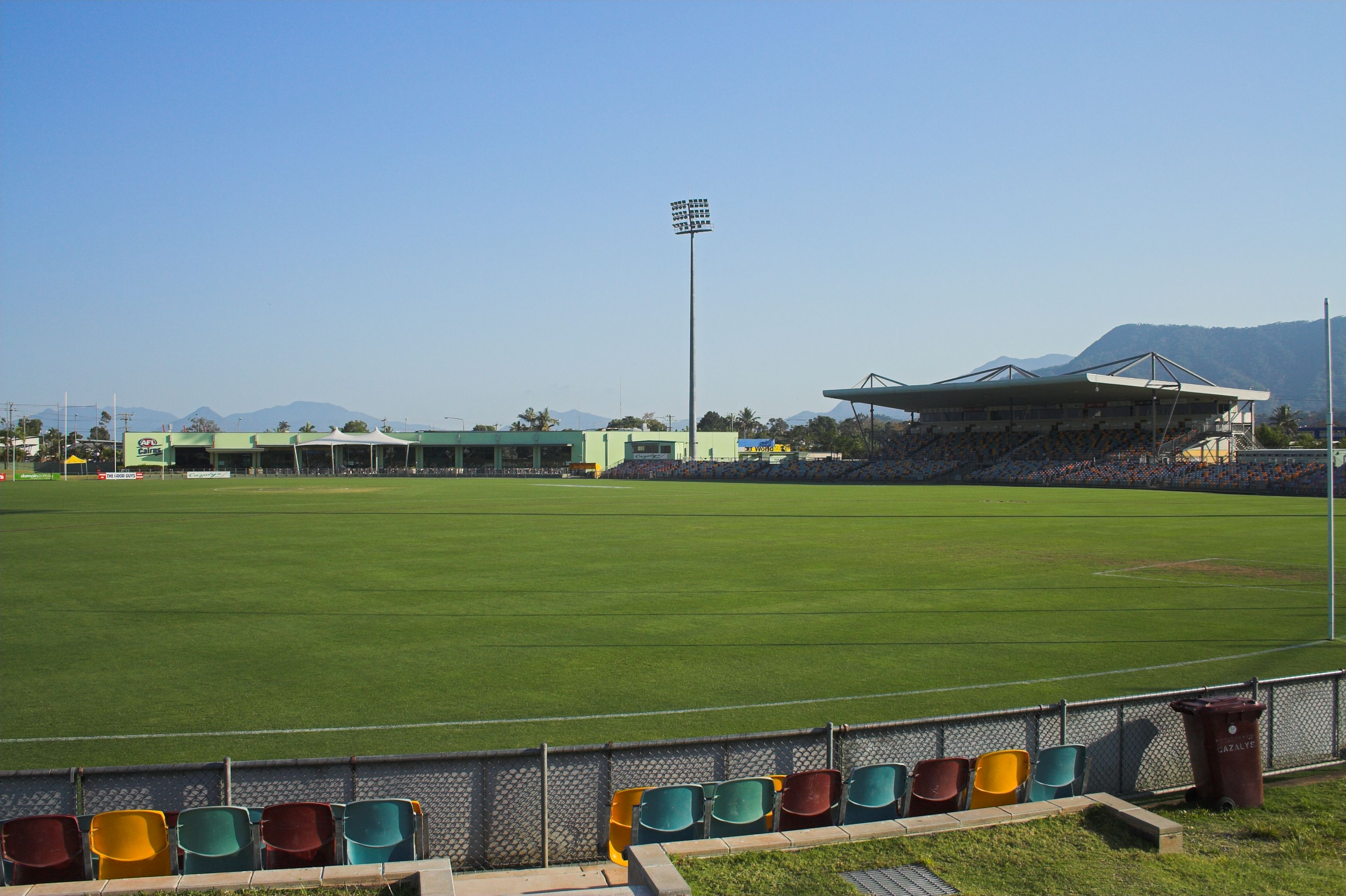
Cazalys Stadium

DFO Cairns is a large shopping centre at 274 Mulgrave Road (16.9348°S 145.7538°E).

The Cazalys Stadium is at 344 Mulgrave Road (16.9364°S 145.7495°E). It is used for cricket, rugby league, soccer, and AFL matches.

Jones Park at 18-40 Mann Street (16.9251°S 145.7589°E) offers further sporting facilities.

== Education ==
There are no schools in Westcourt.. The nearest primary government schools are Parramatta State School in Parramatta Park to the north-east, Balaclava State School in Mooroobool to the south-west, and Cairns West State School in Manunda to the north-west. The nearest government secondary school is Trinity Bay State High School in Manunda.

== Community groups ==
Established in 1989, the Cairns and District Family Society maintains a library of world-wide genealogy material at 271 Gatton Street. The society publishes new genealogical resources based on collecting and indexing family information relating to Far North Queensland.
