= Brinsmead, Queensland =

Brinsmead
- Suburb
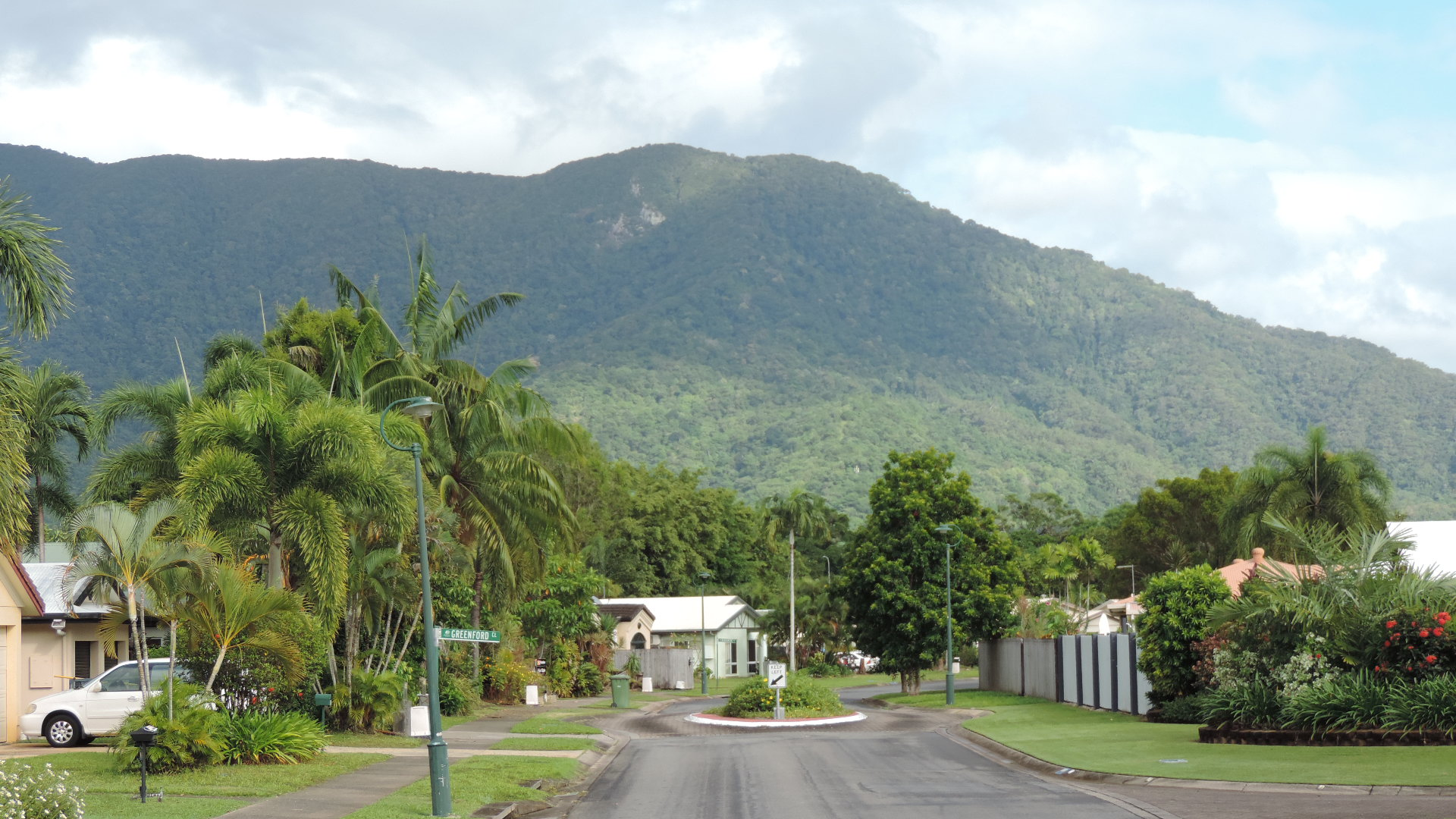
- Looking west down Meander Close, Brismead, 2018

- Interactive map of Brinsmead
- Coordinates: 16.9013°S 145.7147°E
- Country: Australia
- State: Queensland
- City: Cairns
- LGA: Cairns Region
- Location: 8.5 km (5.3 mi) NW of Cairns CBD; 350 km (220 mi) N of Townsville; 1,712 km (1,064 mi) NNW of Brisbane
- Established: 1975

Government
  - State electorate: Cairns
  - Federal division: Leichhardt

Area
  - Total: 5.1 km^{2} (2.0 sq mi)

Population
  - Total: 5,537 (2021 census)
  - Density: 1,086/km^{2} (2,812/sq mi)
- Time zone: UTC+10:00 (AEST)
- Postcode: 4870
Suburbs around Brinsmead
Redlynch	Freshwater	Stratford
Redlynch	Brinsmead	Whitfield
Redlynch	Redlynch	Kanimbla

Brinsmead is a northern suburb of Cairns in the Cairns Region, Far North Queensland, Australia. In the 2021 census, Brinsmead had a population of 5,537 people.

== Geography ==
Brinsmead is located 8.5 km (5.3 mi) by road north-west of the city centre of Cairns.

The north-east of the locality is within Mount Whitfield Conservation Park which extends into the neighbouring locality of Mount Whitfield to the north-east. Apart from this protected area, the land use is predominantly residential.

== History ==
Brinsmead is situated in the Yidinji traditional Aboriginal country. The suburb takes its name from the Brinsmead Gap, a topographical feature between the hills of the Whitfield Range, in turn named after Horace George Brinsmead, a sugar plantation owner at Freshwater who guided groups to see the Barron Falls, one of the first tourism ventures in the district.

Cairns Christian College opened on 25 January 1983. It was later renamed Freshwater Christian College.

== Demographics ==
In the 2016 census, Brinsmead had a population of 5,362 people.

In the 2021 census, Brinsmead had a population of 5,537 people.

== Education ==
Freshwater Christian College is a private primary and secondary (Prep-12) school for boys and girls at 369-401 Brinsmead Road (16.8925°S 145.7082°E). It is owned by the Freshwater Church, which is affiliated with the Australian Christian Churches. In 2018, the school had an enrolment of 580 students with 46 teachers (40 full-time equivalent) and 52 non-teaching staff (42 full-time equivalent).

There are no government schools in Brinsmead. The nearest government primary schools are Freshwater State School in neighbouring Freshwater to the north and Whitfield State School in neighbouring Whitfield to the east. The nearest government secondary schools are Redlynch State College in neighbouring Redlynch to the south-west and Trinity Bay State High School in Manunda to the south-east.

== Amenities ==
Brinsmead Community Hall is at 85 Loridan Drive (16.89810°S 145.71413°E). It is capable of seating up to 80 people and is operated by the Cairns Regional Council.

There are a number of parks in the area:

- Goomboora Park (16.9058°S 145.7049°E)
- Shale Street Park (16.9057°S 145.7072°E)
- The Glenoma Park (16.8989°S 145.7088°E)

== Facilities ==
There is a water treatment plant at the top of the hill on Brinsmead Terrace (16.9106°S 145.7103°E). This facility treats water piped from Freshwater Creek upstream of the popular Crystal Cascades recreation area in Redlynch. Water supply for treatment is released for this purpose from Lake Morris empounded by Copperlode Dam. Treated potable drinking water from this facility in Brinsmead is then distributed throughout the Cairns water supply network.
