= Xavier and Sadie Herbert's Cottage =

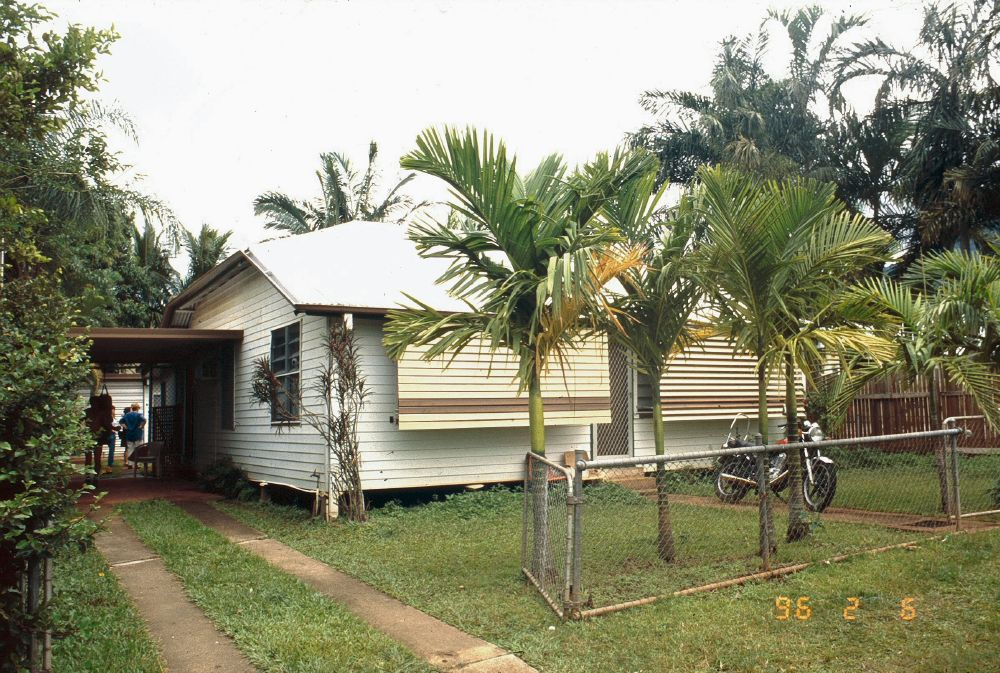
- Xavier and Sadie Herbert's Cottage, 1996

- Location within Queensland Location within Australia
- 16.8873°S 145.697°E
- Location: 399 Kamerunga Road, Redlynch, Cairns, Cairns Region, Queensland, Australia

History
- Design period: 1940s–1960s (post-World War II)
- Built: c. 1920–1970s

Queensland Heritage Register
- Official name: Xavier and Sadie Herbert's Cottage (former), Sadie's House
- Type: state heritage (built)
- Designated: 24 January 1997
- Reference no.: 601739
- Significant period: 1950s–1980s (historical) c. 1920, 1950s–1970s (fabric)
- Significant components: residential accommodation – main house, other – residential: component, extension/s or addition/s, fence/wall – perimeter, trees/plantings

Xavier and Sadie Herbert's Cottage is a heritage-listed cottage at 399 Kamerunga Road, Redlynch, Cairns, Cairns Region, Queensland, Australia. It was built from c. 1920 to 1970s. It is also known as Sadie's House. It was added to the Queensland Heritage Register on 24 January 1997.

== History ==
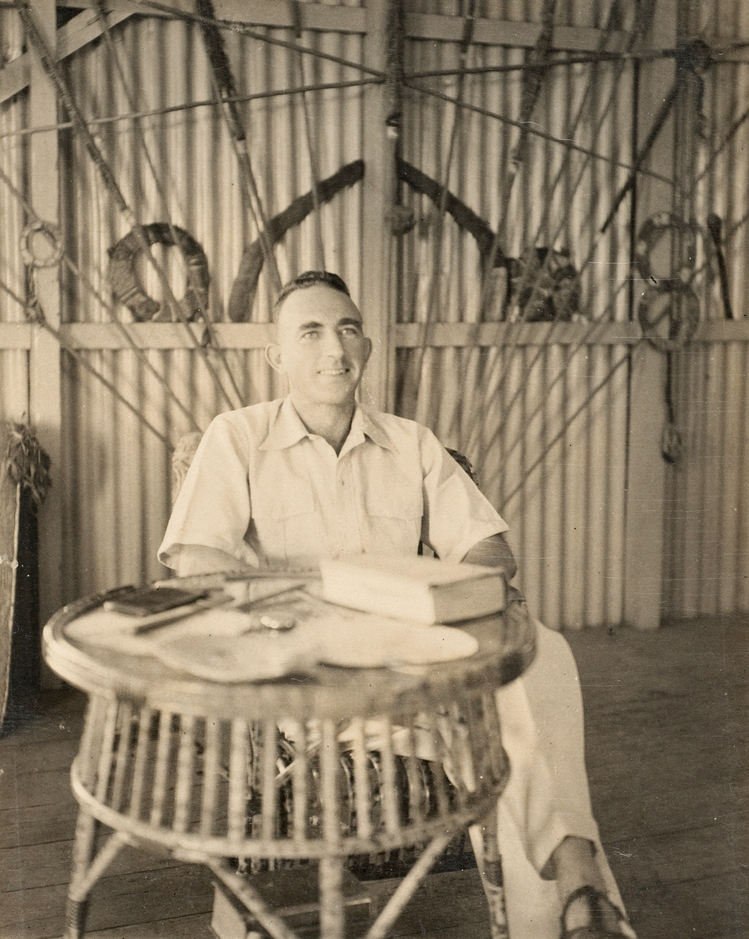
Xavier Herbert, 1938

This modest timber-framed cottage was purchased in 1951 by Xavier Herbert, an Australian writer whose work has achieved international recognition. It was intended as a home for his wife, Sadie Norden, but was also to remain Herbert's principal place of residence for over 30 years. At the Redlynch cottage, Herbert worked on all of his major works except Capricornia.

The cottage is situated in the village of Redlynch at the base of the coastal ranges northwest of Cairns. The area was logged for its cedar from the mid-late 1870s. Selections were taken up in the mid-1880s following the 1886 decision to construct a railway from Cairns to the Atherton Tableland through the area, and the Eight-mile Railway Station was opened in October 1887 as the terminus for the first stage of the Cairns-Mareeba railway. Eight-mile was renamed Redlynch almost immediately, and a small village grew around the station. In the 1920s and 1930s Redlynch developed as the centre of an important sugar-growing district. The cottage which the Herberts later acquired, along with several adjacent similar cottages, may have been constructed in the 1920s, although the present land subdivision was not surveyed until 1938.

Alfred Francis Xavier Herbert (1901–1984) was born in Western Australia and educated at Fremantle, where he trained as a pharmacist. In 1925 he moved to Melbourne where he studied medicine for a year. His first published short story appeared in The Australian Journal (Melbourne) at this time and Herbert decided to quit university studies to pursue a writing career. In 1926 he moved to Sydney and joined the staff of Smith's Weekly. In the late 1920s he travelled (mostly walking) around northern Australia and the South Pacific doing various odd jobs, and spent two years in England 1930–32. While in England he completed the initial draft of Capricornia, with the support of Sadie Norden, whom he later married. Late in 1932 he returned to Australia and wrote short stories for journals and newspapers to help bring Sadie to Australia in 1933. After some difficulty, Capricornia was published in Australia in 1938. It won Australia's sesquicentenary novel competition that year and became a best seller.

Herbert served in the Second World War and after demobilisation he and Sadie travelled north from Sydney and took up the lease on a dairy farm in the Daintree River area for a few years. In June 1951 they bought the cottage at Redlynch, Xavier accepting a fellowship with the Australian Literary Fund and applying for a War Service Loan in order to make the purchase. The house was intended for Sadie's benefit, Xavier not believing in "comforts", but it is possible neither of them anticipated the length of time they were to own the property. In August 1951, Xavier wrote of Sadie:

... she's not settling down, just getting a little house in [which?] to put all those things of hers

However, the house was to remain their principal place of residence for the remainder of their lives.

After the move to Redlynch, Herbert alternated casual occupations with writing, and published irregularly. Through his short stories and novels, he explored the search for security and an Australian identity, the mistreatment of Aborigines and the destruction of the environment. Most of his work is set in the Australian bush and in small country towns. Seven Emus appeared in 1959; Soldiers' Women in 1961; Larger than Life and Disturbing Element in 1963. After nearly a decade of preparation, Poor Fellow My Country was published in 1975, winning the Miles Franklin Award that year. A work of about 850,000 words, it is the longest novel ever published in Australia.

It is clear from interviews given by Herbert that Sadie Norden provided the emotional centre to his life, and the house at Redlynch, which he always called "Sadie's house", became equally important. Xavier continued to write his first drafts away from home, establishing camps in the ranges between Cairns and Cooktown for weeks or months at a time, and often taking jobs away from Redlynch, but always returned to Sadie and Redlynch to develop the drafts. He once acknowledged:

"I'd never go on writing anything if Sadie didn't like it"

Sadie and the cottage at Redlynch provided a base for his work and to his existence. Herbert later said of Redlynch that

"it was the most beautiful little town I ever set eyes on"

Like many of the characters and places in Xavier Herbert's novels and stories, however, the village of Redlynch inhabits two worlds. Not quite town and not quite country, Redlynch is almost a suburb of Cairns - where Sadie lodged Xavier's first drafts with their bank - but lies amid sugar cane fields at the base of the coastal ranges where Xavier established his writer's camps.

The Herberts became well known to the Redlynch community, with Xavier acting as relieving pharmacist in the village during the 1950s and 1960s. A fitness fanatic, he regularly jogged through the canefields, along the railway and into the hills, before jogging became fashionable, and claimed he gained the inspiration to write Poor Fellow My Country while running. Xavier was also known for his attempts at self-sufficiency. He experimented with battery-powered DC electricity, and the wiring in the cottage may contain remnants of this system. In the backyard he constructed a small "writer's shed", which local residents believe was made of two small sheds taken from the Kuranda Scenic Railway and moved by railcar to Redlynch. Poor Fellow My Country was partly written and revised here 1969–74, but this structure was demolished late in 1995.

With the prize money received for Poor Fellow My Country, the Herberts carried out a number of alterations to the Redlynch cottage. A septic system was installed and a new bathroom and toilet were built at the rear of the house. The interior was modernised with plasterboard ceilings and imitation timber-grain wall panelling. The exterior was re-clad with aluminium, enclosing the front verandah in the process, and a garage and guest room for the use of visiting friends and academics was built in the backyard. A new carport was constructed at the side of the cottage.

Following Sadie's death in 1979, Xavier remained in the cottage until a few months before his own death at Alice Springs in April 1984. Toward the end of his life, Herbert in 1983 gave the Redlynch cottage to his friend and bank agent Robyn Pill, asking her to look after the house when he left. She retained the place until 1989.

There have been substantial renovations to the Redlynch cottage since the Herberts' time, with the interior reconstructed and refurbished in mid-1996, and most of the trees and shrubs in the garden removed, except for a number of palm trees. A great loss was the writer's shed in the backyard, Xavier's million dollar dog house, demolished in the summer of 1995–96.

== Description ==
The former Xavier and Sadie Herbert's Cottage is located in the heart of the village of Redlynch, about 13 kilometres (8.1 mi) northwest of Cairns. The house is positioned quite close to the front of a level, 25 perch block abutting busy Kamerunga Road, one of the principal roads out of Cairns. It sits directly opposite the Redlynch railway station and adjacent to the Red Beret (formerly Redlynch) Hotel, the focal point of the village, and overlooks cane fields to the ranges beyond. The setting is picturesque.

The cottage is a small, single-storeyed, timber-framed building with enclosed front and back verandahs, and a concrete block extension at the rear. It rests on low stumps, mostly timber, although a few of these have been replaced with round concrete stumps or galvanised steel. The exterior has been re-clad with aluminium which resembles weatherboards. The hipped roof is clad with corrugated sheet metal. All the windows appear to have been replaced at some period, and those along the west wall have new decorative metal window hoods. The front facade has recent decorative timber lattice. Attached to the house on the east side is a single carport with a skillion roof and front roller-door. A high concrete block wall defines the eastern boundary of the property; fences to the other boundaries and along the west side of the front driveway are of pickets.

The internal layout of the cottage, originally two rooms opening onto front and back verandahs, has been altered. The centre wall has been removed and two new internal partitions now divide the core of the house into three rooms: a bedroom each side and in the centre a living area with an archway opening onto the enclosed front verandah. The bedrooms retain their original French doors to the enclosed front verandah, but all the other doors in the house are modern. The interior walls and ceilings are lined with fibrous plasterboard. It is not clear whether any of the Herbert's mock timber-panelling of the 1970s remains beneath the present wall finishes.

The back verandah may have been partly enclosed from an early period, but was fully enclosed in the Herberts' time and has been refurbished recently with a new kitchen at the west end and bathroom at the east end. A centrally-positioned door leads from the back verandah to an attached extension. This comprises a 1.9-metre (6 ft 3 in) wide concrete slab running the width of the house, with concrete block laundry at the east end and toilet at the west end. The middle section of this extension is enclosed with timber lattice.

In the backyard, at a short distance from the house, a garage has been constructed on the eastern half of the block. This structure is clad in aluminium and rests on a concrete block. It has a skillion roof and is divided into two sections. The eastern half is garage, and the western half, with windows on three sides and doors front and back, is used as a workout area.

The Herberts' garden is almost non-existent. The only substantial surviving planting is a stand of palms in the backyard. The Alexandra Palms across the front alignment of the property appear to be comparatively recent, and may not have been associated with the Herberts.

== Heritage listing ==
The former Xavier and Sadie Herbert's Cottage was listed on the Queensland Heritage Register on 24 January 1997 having satisfied the following criteria.

The place is important in demonstrating the evolution or pattern of Queensland's history.

The place has potential to yield information that will contribute to an understanding of Queensland's history.

The place has a strong or special association with a particular community or cultural group for social, cultural or spiritual reasons.

The place has a special association with the life or work of a particular person, group or organisation of importance in Queensland's history.

The former Xavier and Sadie Herbert's Cottage is significant as the only house in Australia with strong associations with important Australian author Xavier Herbert and his work. The place is significant also for its potential to contribute to biographical work on Xavier and Sadie Herbert. The place has a strong association for both the local Redlynch community and the Australian literary and academic community as the home and place of work of Australian writer Xavier Herbert for over 30 years.

The place has a special association with the life and work of internationally respected Australian author Xavier Herbert. At the Redlynch cottage, he worked on all his major works except Capricornia. Although much of this work was undertaken in the now demolished writer's shed in the backyard, the association of the place with Herbert and his work remains. The cottage survives in its Redlynch setting and some of the Herberts' 1970s renovations, paid for with prize money received for Poor Fellow My Country, remain. These were undertaken with inexpensive mass-produced materials and for convenience and ease of maintenance rather than aesthetic concerns, and illustrate Herbert's lack of social pretension. The Redlynch cottage also represents an important compromise in Herbert's life, and is significant as much for what it reveals of the person as of the writer.
