= Redlynch, Queensland =

Redlynch
- Town
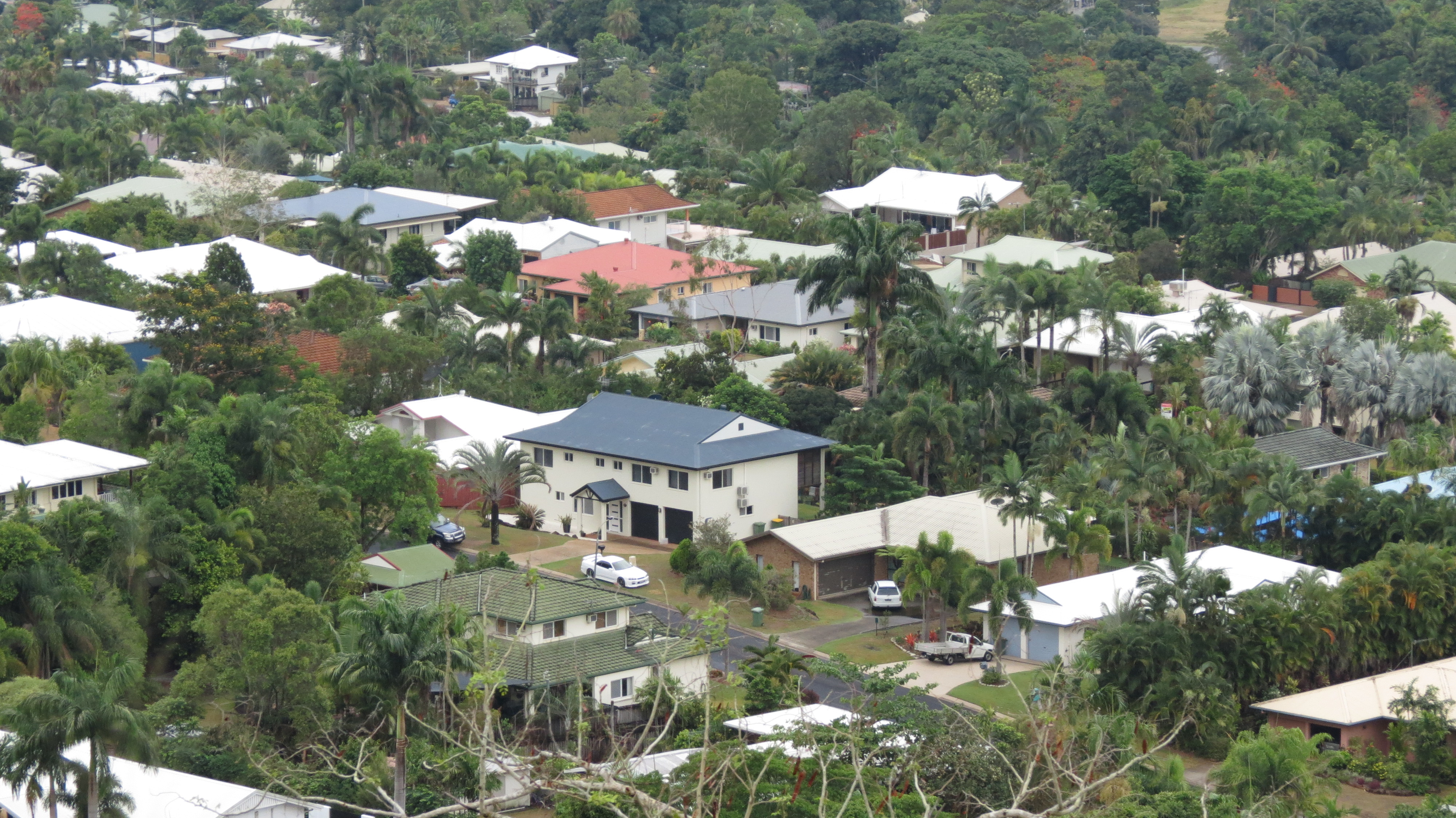
- Redlynch residential housing as seen from the Kuranda Scenic Railway, 2013

- Interactive map of Redlynch
- Coordinates: 16.8894°S 145.6977°E
- Country: Australia
- State: Queensland
- City: Cairns
- LGA: Cairns Region
- Location: 10.9 km (6.8 mi) NW of Cairns CBD; 352 km (219 mi) NNW of Townsville; 1,684 km (1,046 mi) NNW of Brisbane

Government
  - State electorate: Barron River
  - Federal division: Leichhardt

Area
  - Total: 25.4 km^{2} (9.8 sq mi)

Population
  - Total: 10,571 (2021 census)
  - Density: 416.2/km^{2} (1,077.9/sq mi)
- Time zone: UTC+10:00 (AEST)
- Postcode: 4870
Localities around Redlynch
Barron Gorge	Kamerunga	Freshwater
Barron Gorge	Redlynch	Brinsmead
Lamb Range	Lamb Range	Kanimbla

Redlynch is a semi-rural town and suburb of Cairns in the Cairns Region, Queensland, Australia. In the 2021 census, the suburb of Redlynch had a population of 10,571 people.

== Geography ==
Redlynch lies along the valley created by Freshwater Creek with the Redlynch Intake Road being the major artery running from north to south roughly parallel and west of the creek.

Redlynch has the following mountains in the Whitfield Range:

- Boiboi Peak (16.9543°S 145.7059°E), 578 metres (1,896 ft)
- Mooroobool Peak (16.9298°S 145.7112°E), 609 metres (1,998 ft)

Most of the land east of Redlynch Intake Road down to Freshwater Creek is used to grow sugarcane. The residential development occurs to the west of Redlynch Intake Road, while far eastern and far western parts of the suburb are undeveloped bushland on steep slopes rising to 500–600 metres which form part of the Barron Gorge National Park. The Kuranda Scenic Railway winds its way up the north-eastern slopes of Redlynch with two stations in the suburb:

- Redlynch railway station (16.8870°S 145.6967°E)
- Jungara railway station, now abandoned (16.9062°S 145.6908°E)

Jump Up is a neighbourhood in the suburb (16.8919°S 145.6913°E).

== History ==
Redlynch is situated in the Yidinji traditional Aboriginal country.

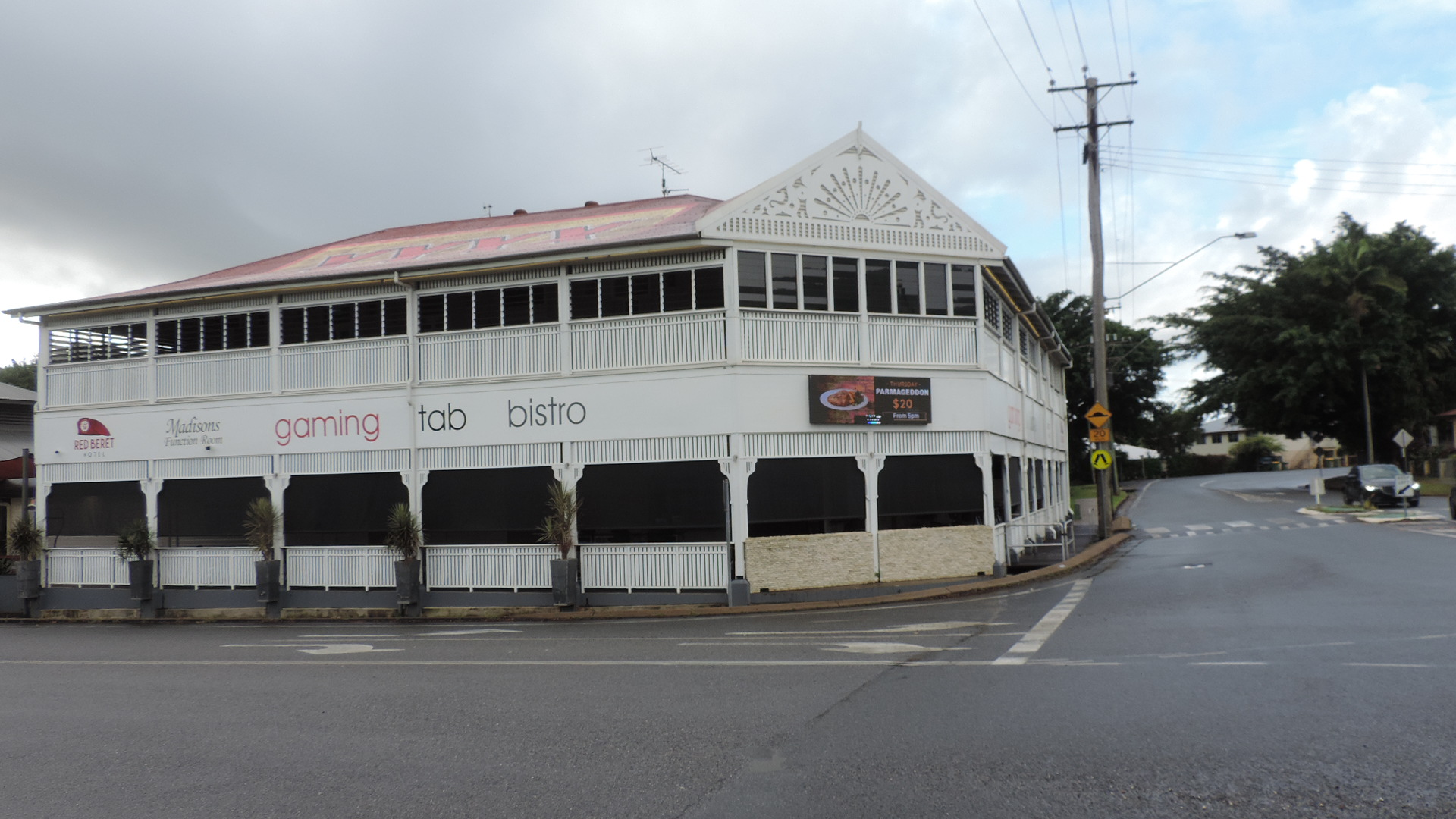
Red Beret Hotel, 2018

The first stage of the Cairns-to-Herberton railway line was from Cairns to a location that was known to the project as the Eight Mile Camp. This first stage opened in November 1887 at which time the railway station at the Eight Mile Camp was named Redlynch railway station. According to the Queensland Railway Department, the name Redlynch refers to Redlynch, Wiltshire in England, but other government information suggests it was named after Redlynch, Somerset in England.

In anticipation of the railway's opening, Thomas Dillon constructed the Terminus Hotel built near the Redlynch railway station. The hotel was sold to Joseph Best in December 1888, and passed to Thomas Lavercombe in July 1889. Subsequent licensees included Samuel Thomas Walker and William Arthur. In March 1891, Arthur was bankrupted and the hotel was sold to Mangus Petersen. It was destroyed by fire in the 1920s.

The Redlynch Hotel was constructed in 1926 opposite the railway station; it is now known as the Red Beret Hotel. The hotel was built opposite to the Terminus Hotel, which burned down in the 1920s

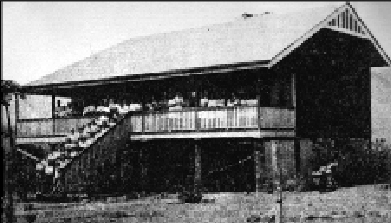
Original Redlynch State School

Redlynch State School opened on 15 February 1932 on Intake Road with an initial enrolment of 80 students. Circa 1994, the school moved to a new site further along Intake Road on a former sugarcane farm, opening with 180 students. In 2007, a secondary school was added to create Redlynch State College.

St Andrew's Catholic College opened in 2001, initially offering Pre-School to Year 4. It had an initial 89 students under founding principal Mrs Lauretta Graham. All Saint's Chapel was opened in 2009.

The Redlynch Central Shopping Centre opened in 2005 and expanded in 2014.

In 2019, a deadly fungus, poison fire coral, was found in a pocket of rainforest in the suburb.

== Demographics ==
In the 2016 census, the suburb of Redlynch had a population of 9,728 people.

In the 2021 census, the suburb of Redlynch had a population of 10,571 people.

== Heritage listings ==
Redlynch has the following heritage listings:

- Xavier and Sadie Herbert's Cottage, 399 Kamerunga Road (16.8873°S 145.697°E)
- Cairns-to-Kuranda railway line, Redlynch to Kuranda (16.9146°S 145.6914°E)

== Education ==
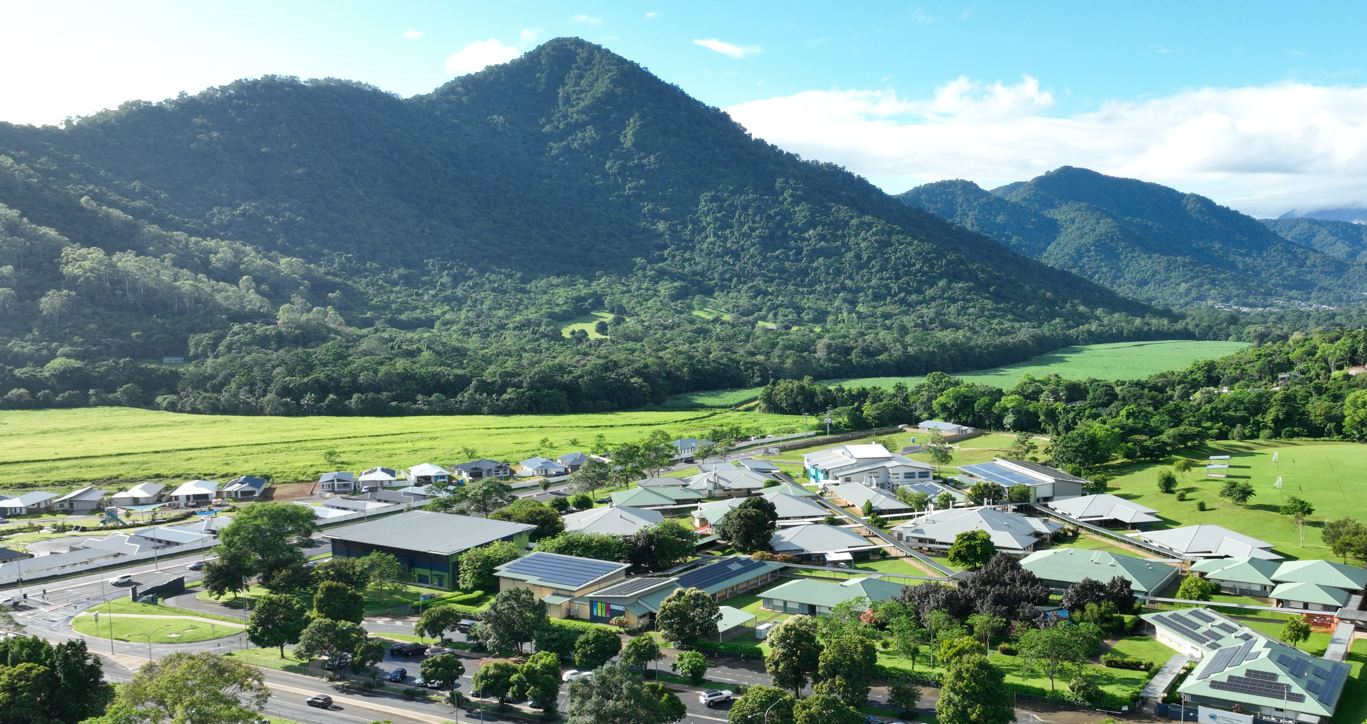
Redlynch State College, 2025

Redlynch State College is a government primary and secondary (Prep–12) school for boys and girls at Jungara Road (16.9092°S 145.6958°E). In 2018, the school had an enrolment of 1,827 students with 152 teachers (141 full-time equivalent) and 73 non-teaching staff (57 full-time equivalent). It includes a special education program.

St Andrew's Catholic College Redlynch Valley is a Catholic primary and secondary (Prep–12) school for boys and girls at 185-205 Intake Road (16.9040°S 145.6992°E). In 2018, the school had an enrolment of 1,682 students with 132 teachers (125 full-time equivalent) and 89 non-teaching staff (54 full-time equivalent).

== Amenities ==
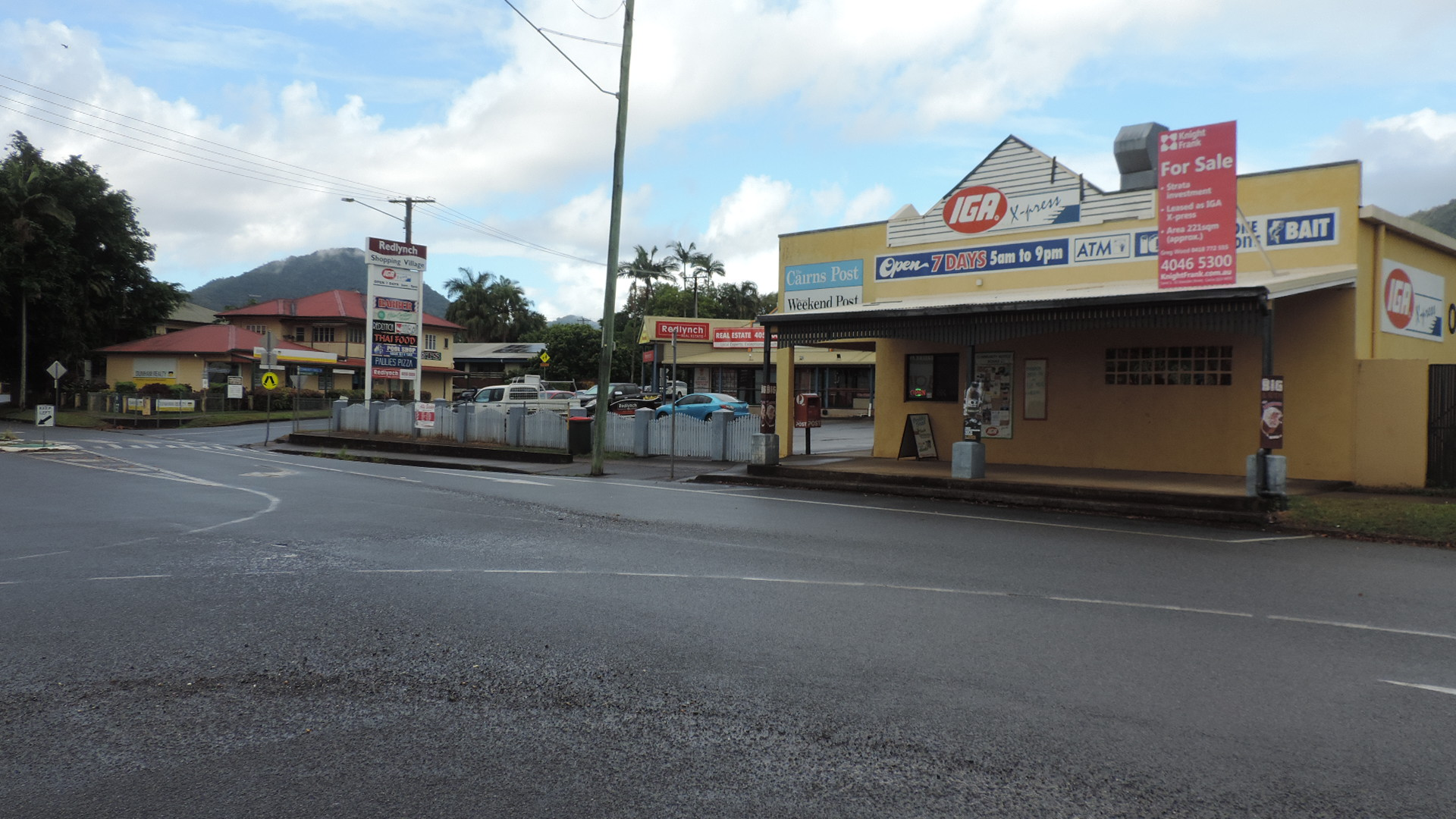
Redlynch Shopping Village, 2018

Redlynch Shopping Village is opposite the hotel and diagonally opposite the railway station on the corner of Redlynch Intake Road and Margaret Street. Redlynch Central Shopping Centre is located in Larsen Road off Redlynch Connection Road.

All Saints' Catholic Chapel is at St Andrew's College at Intake Road. It is within the Northern Beaches Parish of the Roman Catholic Diocese of Cairns.
