= Edge Hill, Queensland =

Edge Hill Queensland
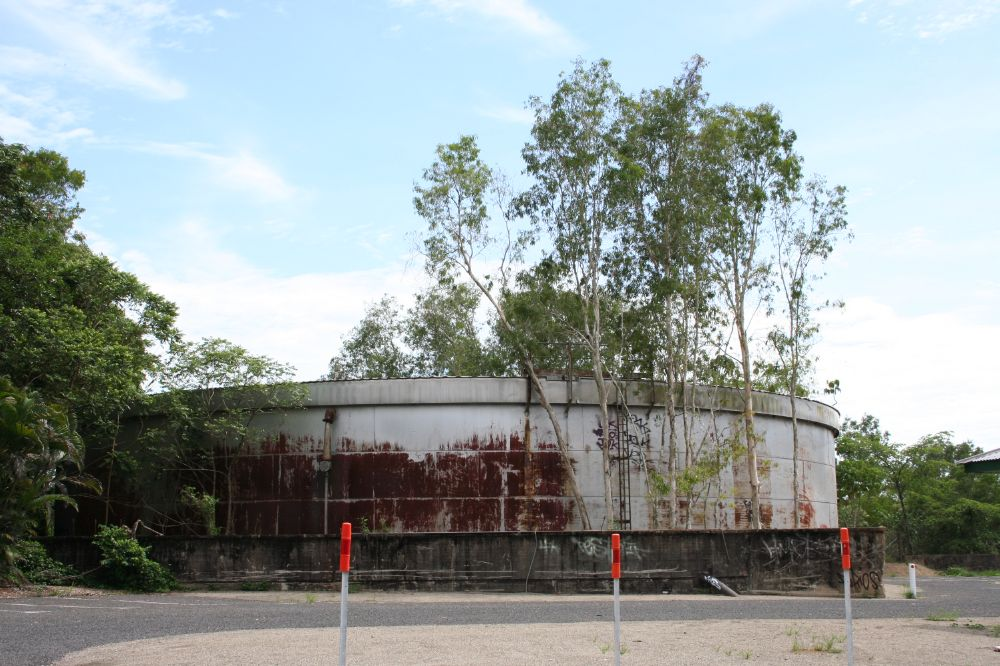
- Former World War II fuel installation, now arts centre, 2008

- Coordinates: 16.9019°S 145.7430°E
- Population: 4,088 (2021 census)
  - Density: 1,572/km^{2} (4,070/sq mi)
- Postcode(s): 4870
- Area: 2.6 km^{2} (1.0 sq mi)
- Time zone: AEST (UTC+10:00)
- Location: 4.3 km (3 mi) NW of Cairns CBD; 348 km (216 mi) N of Townsville; 1,706 km (1,060 mi) NNW of Brisbane
- LGA(s): Cairns Region
- State electorate(s): Cairns
- Federal division(s): Leichhardt
Suburbs around Edge Hill:
Whitfield	Whitfield	Whitfield
Whitfield	Edge Hill	Cairns North
Manoora	Manoora	Manunda

Edge Hill is an inner suburb of the city of Cairns in Far North Queensland, Australia located approximately four kilometres north west of the city centre. In the 2021 census, Edge Hill had a population of 4,088 people.

== History ==
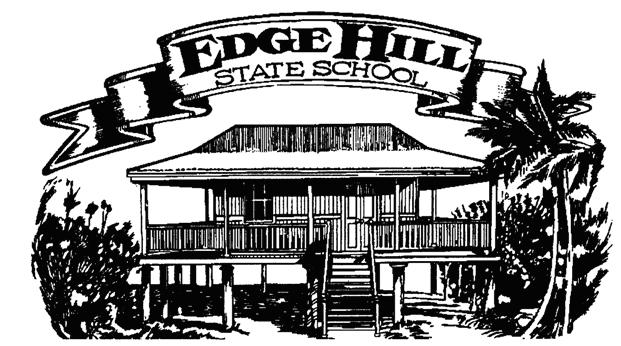
Original one-classroom school building, Edge Hill State School, circa 1940

Edge Hill is situated in the Yidinji traditional Aboriginal country.

The origin of the suburb name is from the name given to the township developed near the historical Edgecliff quarry site. This township became known as Edge Hill because of the location situated on the foothills of Mount Whitfield.

Edge Hill State School opened on 5 February 1940 with one classroom and one teacher.

== Demographics ==
In the 2016 census, Edge Hill had a population of 3,916 people.

In the 2021 census, Edge Hill had a population of 4,088 people.

== Heritage listings ==
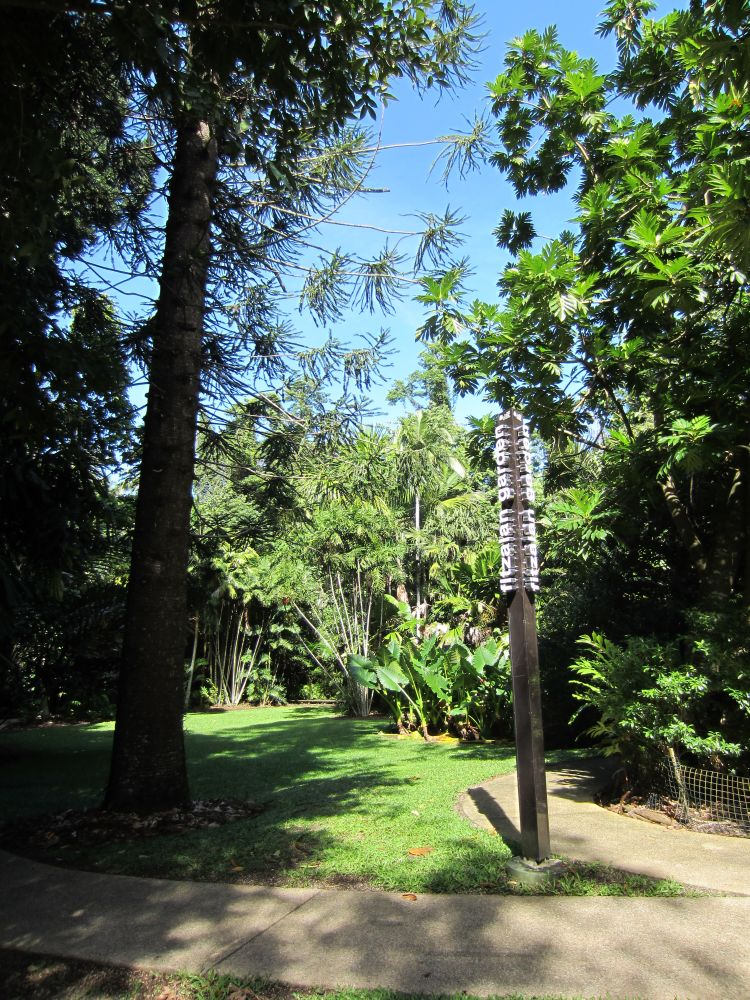
Fleckers Botanic Gardens, 2015

Edge Hill has the following heritage listings:

- Collins Avenue: Flecker Botanical Gardens
- Collins Avenue: WWII RAN Fuel Installation (now the Tanks Arts Centre), a multi-use, contemporary arts facility for the visual and performing arts.

== Education ==
Edge Hill State School is a government primary (Prep–6) school for boys and girls at 254 Pease Street (16.9052°S 145.7424°E). In 2018, the school had an enrolment of 1,158 students with 75 teachers (68 full-time equivalent) and 48 non-teaching staff (30 full-time equivalent). It includes a special education program.

There are no secondary schools in Edge Hill. The nearest government secondary schools are Trinity Bay State High School in neighbouring Manunda to the south-east and Cairns State High School in neighbouring Cairns North to the east.

== Amenities ==
The Church of Jesus Christ of Latter-Day Saints is at 147 Woodward Street (16.9014°S 145.7368°E).

Edge Hill Memorial Bowls Club is a lawn bowls club at 181 Woodward Street (16.9012°S 145.7347°E).

The Serbian Cultural Centre is at 67 Greenslopes Street (16.9040°S 145.7475°E).

There are a number of parks in the area:

- Centenary Lakes (16.9017°S 145.7492°E)
- Flecker Botanic Gardens (16.8990°S 145.7475°E)
- Woodward Park (16.9094°S 145.7400°E)
