= Cairns West State School =

Location
- Cairns, Queensland; Australia; 16.9232°S 145.7424°E

Information
- Type: Public State Primary
- Motto: Learn now to succeed
- Principal: Jason Evert
- Grades: Prep to 6
- Campus: Manunda
- Colours: Green and black
- Website: cairnswestss.eq.edu.au

Cairns West State School is a public, co-educational, primary school, located on Mayers Street, in the Cairns suburb of Manunda, in Queensland, Australia. It is administered by the Department of Education, with an enrolment of 511 students and a teaching staff of 51, as of 2023. The school serves students from Prep to Year 6.

== History ==
The school opened on 28 January 1964.

Throughout 1998 and 1999, the school participated in the Community Access Schools (CAS) program, which provided funding to "enhance the quality of services provided to students, their families and communities." With the school donating a space for community learning to take place; 100 adults completed courses in "computer training, first aid, nutrition, government and administration skills," which led to a significant portion of participants securing employment, some even became school volunteers. Additionally, with the Department of Families, Queensland Health and other local agencies, the school established "The 0-6 Integrated Service Delivery Hub," a collective group working case management for children aged between 0 and 6 years old. Finally, the school participated in a CAS project that engaged with young people who were at risk of participating in crime. The program was called 'Boys to Men.' With the conclusion of this program, a decrease in juvenile crime within the area was seen.

The 50th Anniversary of the school occurred in 2014, and part of the celebrations included opening the schools time capsule, however, no one knew where it was buried. After an approximate 12-month search, the time capsule was found, with the help from a previous groundskeeper and a cable finder.

Between 2014 and 2016, the school received $1,740,000 from the National Partnership Program (NPP) and Gonski funding, "to improve teaching and learning, increase student engagement, well-being and attendance, and build community."

In 2015, the school was one of a number of schools to take part in a program to assist teachers in teaching more effectively to improve student outcomes.

2017 saw an unofficial bus service by volunteers for the school, which saw some student's attendance rates increase from 40% to 86%, which increased grades, and overall attitude towards school.

== Curriculum ==
As of 2017, the school has an entrepreneurship class, where students create their own computer games. The process includes creating the base idea, developing and coding the games, and finally marketing and selling them to the school community.

== See also ==
- List of schools in Far North Queensland
