= Manunda, Queensland =

Manunda
- Suburb
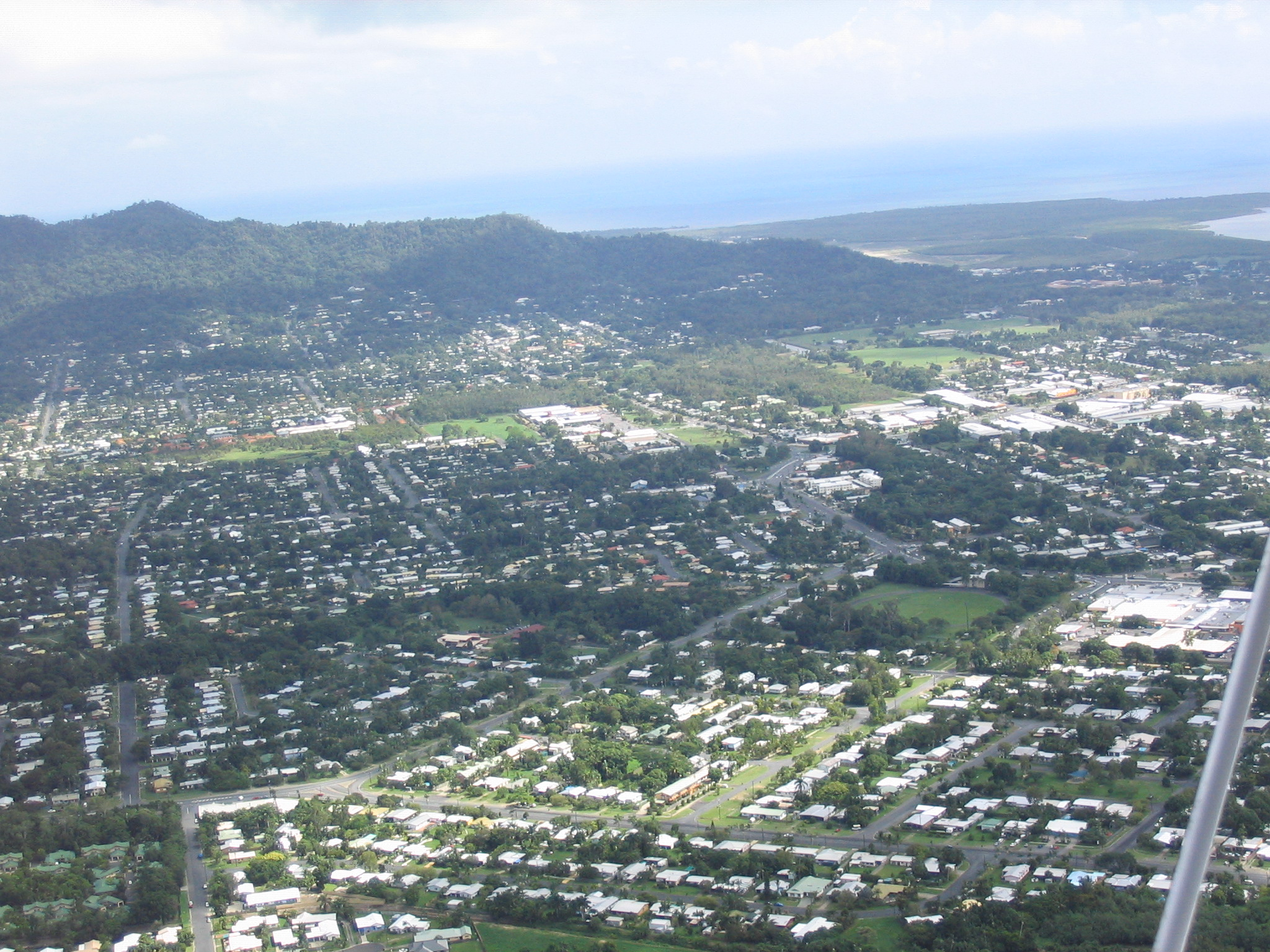
- Aerial view over Manunda.jpg

- Interactive map of Manunda
- Coordinates: 16.9191°S 145.7483°E
- Country: Australia
- State: Queensland
- City: Cairns
- LGA: Cairns Region
- Location: 3.4 km (2.1 mi) W of Cairns CBD; 346 km (215 mi) NNW of Townsville; 1,677 km (1,042 mi) NNW of Brisbane

Government
  - State electorate: Cairns
  - Federal division: Leichhardt

Area
  - Total: 4.2 km^{2} (1.6 sq mi)

Population
  - Total: 5,191 (2021 census)
  - Density: 1,236/km^{2} (3,200/sq mi)
- Time zone: UTC+10:00 (AEST)
- Postcode: 4870
Suburbs around Manunda
Edge Hill	Edge Hill	Cairns North
Manoora	Manunda	Parramatta Park
Mooroobool	Westcourt	Westcourt

Manunda is a suburb of Cairns in the Cairns Region, Queensland, Australia. In the 2021 census, Manunda had a population of 5,191 people.

== Geography ==
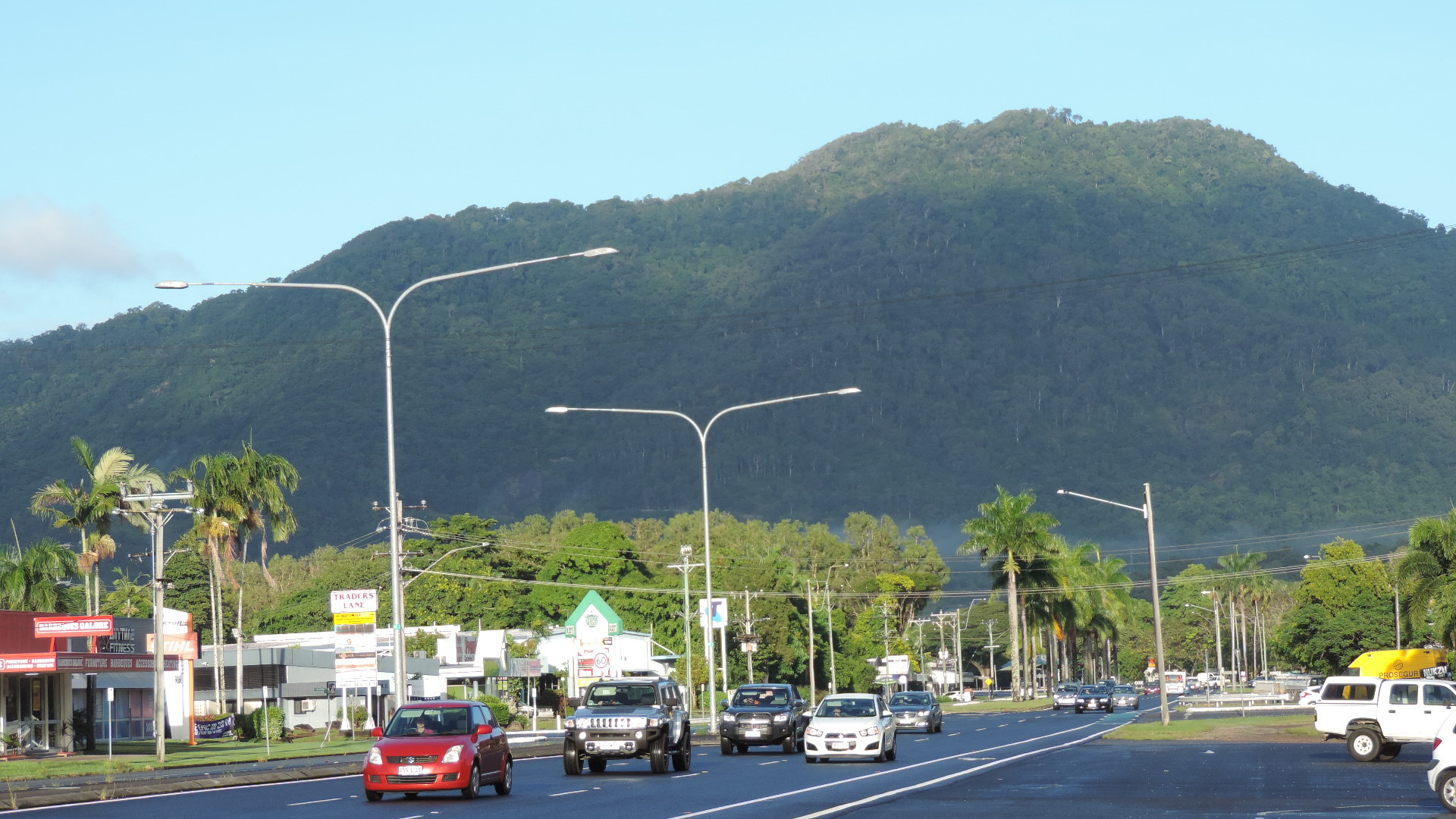
Part of the commercial strip, Anderson Street, 2018

Manunda is a flat suburb (0–10 metres above sea level). The southern part of Manunda is residential while the northern part contains a number of community amenities including sportsgrounds and the Cairns Cemetery (also known as Martyn Street Cemetery). In-between is a commercial/industrial estate flanking Anderson Street.

== History ==
Manunda is situated in the Yidinji traditional Aboriginal country.

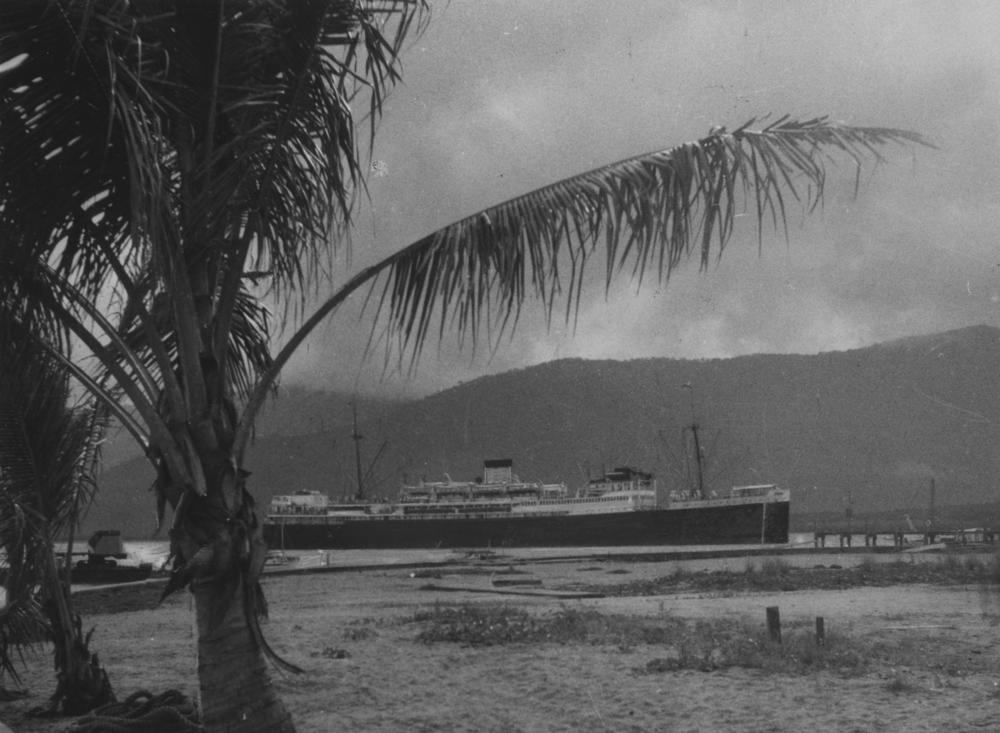
TSMV Manunda entering the harbour at Cairns, 1953

On 11 January 1939 at the Lands Office in Cairns the Queensland Government auctioned 11 town lots of between 30 and 39 perches (760 and 990 m^{2}) between Little Street and the cemetery.

The Cairns Seventh Day Adventist School opened on 6 February 1950 in the Cairns CBD. It later moved to premises at the Cairns Seventh Day Adventist Church at 302 Gatton Street, Manunda. On 27 October 2014, the school moved to purpose-built premises in Gordonvale and was renamed Cairns Adventist College.

Manunda was named by Queensland Place Names Board on 1 September 1973 after TSMV Manunda of the Adelaide Steamship Company which regularly visited Cairns. In 1975 the neighbouring suburb of Manoora was named for Manunda's sister ship HMAS Manoora. The ship was named after an Aboriginal word meaning "place near water".

Trinity Bay State High School opened on 25 January 1960.

Cairns West State School opened on 28 January 1964 with an initial enrolment of 211 students. However, its official opening by Education Minister Jack Pizzey did not take place until 6 February 1965.

St Francis Xavier's Catholic School was established on 23 January 1967 by the Sisters of St Joseph of the Sacred Heart. Although now operated by lay leaders, it maintains the Josephite traditions, including the celebration of feast days for St Joseph, St Francis Xavier, and St Mary MacKillop (the founder of the Sister of St Joseph of the Sacred Heart).

Cairns School of the Air opened in 1972 with 11 students. It provided lessons via HF radio to primary school students in remote locationsto supplement their studies by correspondence with the Correspondence School based in Brisbane. It was located at the Cairns Base of the Royal Flying Doctor Service at Edge Hill. By 1986, it had 280 students being taught by nine teachers. The opening of Schools of the Air in Charters Towers and Longreach reduced the number of remote students being supported from Cairns, but the school's role was expanded to support itinerant students (e.g. children of seasonal workers, carnival workers, etc.). In 1990, it was renamed Cairns School of Distance Education. In 1993, the school moved to a purpose-built facility in Hoare Street, Manunda, and by 1995 had expanded its services to support pre-school students (Prep year not having been introduced in Queensland by that time) and secondary students to Year 10, later expanding to Year 12.

Emmanuel College opened in Manunda on 29 January 1986. In 2001, Emmanuel College closed and became Djarragun College in Gordonvale, a school committed to improving the educational outcomes of Indigenous students in the Cape York Peninsula area.

Manunda Library opened in 1991 and underwent a major refurbishment in 2007.

On 4 February 1991, Trinity Bay Centre for Continuing Secondary Education was established, conducting night classes at Trinity Bay State High School.

Cairns Revival Fellowship Church was built from brick in 1994. It was built from brick.

The Lakes Church of Christ was built in 1995.

Cairns Flexible Learning Centre opened in 2006.

== Demographics ==
In the 2016 census, Manunda had a population of 5,390 people.

In the 2021 census, Manunda had a population of 5,191 people, 16.5% of whom identified as Aboriginal or Torres Strait Islander.

== Education ==
Cairns West State School is a government primary (Prep–6) school for boys and girls at Mayers Street (16.9236°S 145.7422°E). In 2018, the school had an enrolment of 677 students with 58 teachers (54 full-time equivalent) and 42 non-teaching staff (28 full-time equivalent). It includes a special education program and an intensive English language program.

St Francis Xavier's School is a Catholic primary (Prep–6) school for boys and girls at 5 Atkinson Street (16.9238°S 145.7409°E). In 2018, the school had an enrolment of 530 students with 35 teachers and 20 non-teaching staff (13 full-time equivalent).

Cairns School of Distance Education is a government primary and secondary (Early Childhood to Year 12) school for boys and girls at 62 Hoare Street (16.9235°S 145.7507°E). It provides distance education to students without access to local schools in remote areas in Far North Queensland (an area of more than 300,000 square kilometres (120,000 sq mi)). It also supports students who are overseas, travelling, or unable to attend local schools for medical reasons. It also supports students who are attending local schools to study subjects that are not taught at their local school. In 2018, the school had an enrolment of 2,166 students with 123 teachers (114 full-time equivalent) and 45 non-teaching staff (34 full-time equivalent). It includes a special education program.

Cairns Flexible Learning Centre is a specific-purpose primary and secondary (5–10) school at 90 Clarke Street (16.9213°S 145.7500°E). It is one of the Positive Learning Centres aimed at individually-tailored approaches to re-engage with children disengaged from schooling.

Trinity Bay State High School is a government secondary (7–12) school for boys and girls at 26–62 Hoare Street (16.9237°S 145.7524°E). In 2018, the school had an enrolment of 1702 students with 143 teachers (135 full-time equivalent) and 76 non-teaching staff (61 full-time equivalent). It includes a special education program and an intensive English language program.

TAFE Queensland has its Cairns campus at Eureka Street (16.9212°S 145.7543°E). Woree State High School (in Woree) has a SchoolTech campus at the TAFE campus for Years 11 and 12 students (16.9217°S 145.7543°E). It facilitates combining vocational education with senior secondary schooling.

== Amenities ==
Cairns Regional Council operates a library service in Manunda, located in the Raintrees shopping Centre.

St Francis Xavier Catholic Church is on the corner of Atkinson and Mayer Streets. It is within the Cairns West Parish of the Roman Catholic Diocese of Cairns.

Cairns Revival Fellowship Church is at 58 Arthur Street (16.905391°S 145.752°E).

The Lakes Church is part of the Churches of Christ in Australia and is at 102-104 Macnamara St (16.904584°S 145.751°E).

== Notable people buried in Martyn Street Cemetery ==
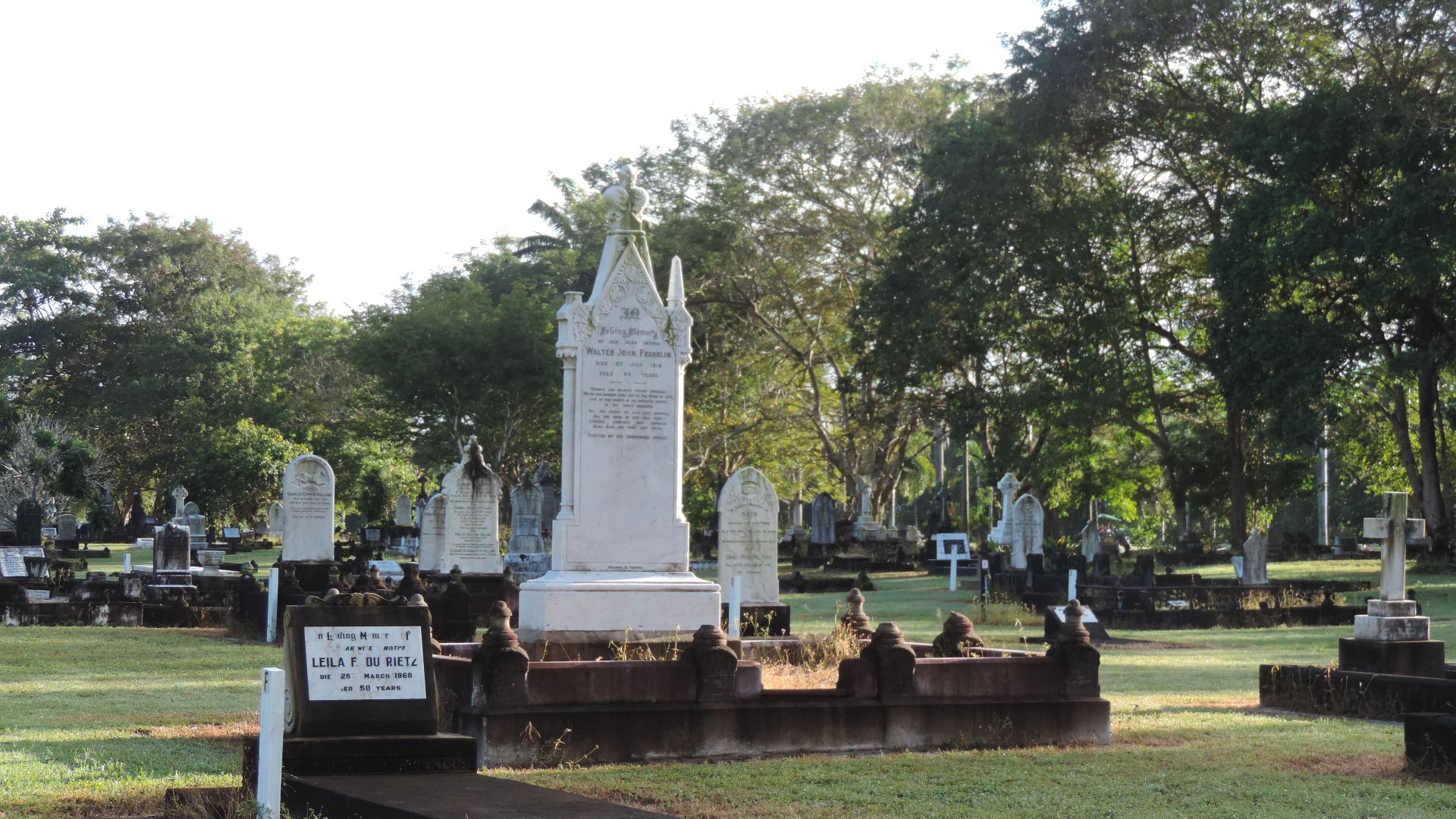
Headstones, Martyn Street cemetery, 2018

- Bunny Adair, Member of the Queensland Legislative Assembly for Cook
- Leonard John Brass, botanist and explorer
- John Heavey, Roman Catholic Bishop of Cairns
- Ray Jones, Member of the Queensland Legislative Assembly for Cairns
- Andrew Leon (also known as Andrew Lee On and Leong Chong), established the first sugar plantation and sugar mill in North Queensland
- John Mann, Member of the Queensland Legislative Assembly for Cairns
- Thomas Nevitt, Member of the Queensland Legislative Council and the Queensland Legislative Assembly for Carpentaria
- Percy Pease, Member of the Queensland Legislative Assembly for Herbert
- Watty Wallace, Member of the Queensland Legislative Assembly for Cairns
