= Trinity Bay State High School =

Location
- Cairns, Queensland; Australia; 16°55′21″S 145°45′09″E

Information
- Type: High school
- Motto: Academic, Innovative, Caring
- Established: 1960
- Principal: Tony Whybird
- Enrolment: 1900+
- Campus: Manunda
- Colours: Green, black and white
- Website: https://trinitybayshs.eq.edu.au

Trinity Bay State High School is a co-educational high school in Manunda, Cairns, Queensland, Australia. In 2024, it had an enrolment of 1788 students across year levels 7 to 12. The school draws from the surrounding “three M” suburbs of Cairns (Manoora, Manunda and Mooroobool), in addition to populations in surrounding mortgage belt suburbs. The student population reflects the multicultural nature of the greater city of Cairns, with 48% of students speaking a language other than English at home. Approximately 35% of students identify themselves as being Indigenous.

The school's motto was formerly "Endeavour", named after the ship on which Captain Cook sailed into Trinity Bay. This was also the name of an incentive scheme at the school, which encouraged the students to set themselves goals and endeavour to achieve them. The current motto is "Academic, Innovative, Caring".

Trinity Bay SHS has a Clontarf academy department on school grounds, helping to engage young Aboriginal and Torres Strait Islander men in their schooling community and employment.

== Excellence programs ==
Trinity Bay State High School offers multiple extra-curricular programs, in the areas of performing arts, visual arts, science, and sports. The performing arts programs, known as the Centre of Artistic Development programs, consist of dance, drama, music and technical theatre. The visual arts program at the school is known as Visual Arts Industries. Trinity Bay's science program is named Science Academy, and only runs from years 7–10. The school also offers both a general athlete program and a rugby league program. The general athlete program, named the Talented Athlete Academy, only runs from years 7–10. The rugby league program is named the Rugby League School of Excellence, and is partnered with both the Northern Pride rugby league club, and the North Queensland Cowboys. The rugby league program also includes the attainment of a Certificate II in Sport – Developing Athlete.

=== AFL Team Achievements ===
==== Junior Male (Years 7-9) ====
- AFL North Queensland Schools Cup

(gold) Champions: 2024

== Notable alumni ==
-Tasia Zalar (graduated 2009)

== See also ==
- List of schools in Far North Queensland
- Queensland state schools
