= Eugene Fitzalan =

Irish-born botanist in Australia

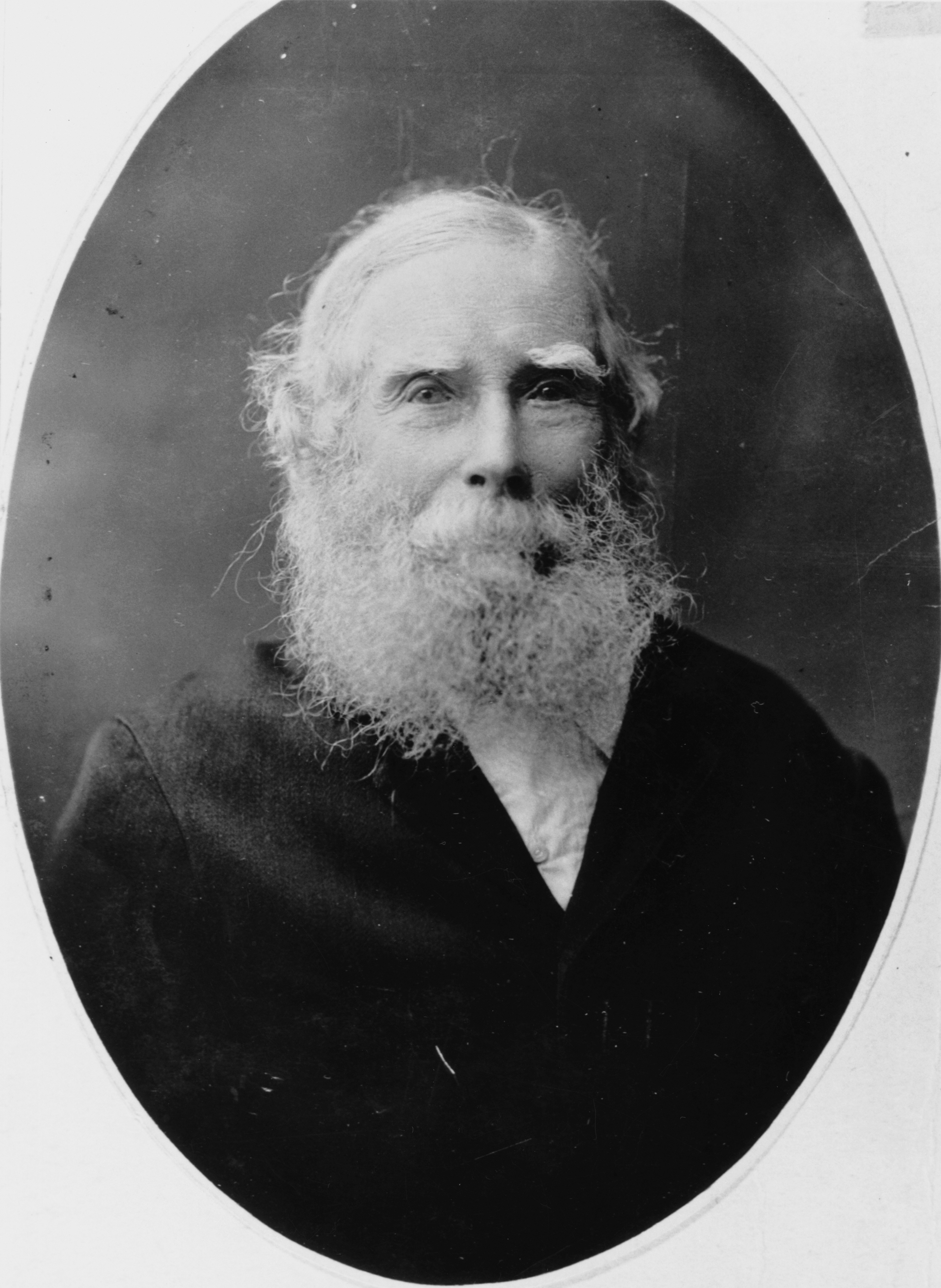
Eugene Fitzalan, botanist on the Dalrymple Expedition of 1861

Eugene Fitzherbert Albini Fitzalan (1830–1911) was an Irish-born botanist in Australia. He made many botanical expedition and discovered numerous new species. He created the first botanical garden in Cairns, Queensland, now the heritage-listed Flecker Botanical Gardens.

== Early life ==
Eugene Fitzherbert Albini Fitzalan was born in Derry, Ireland.

== Botanical and Logging career ==
Fitzalan was a botanical collector in England and Mexico before arriving in Australia in 1849.

He was a keen orchid collector, and on at least one occasion collected with Baron Ferdinand von Mueller, who regarded Fitzalan's specimens very highly. Fitzalan had at least two orchids named after him by Mueller.

He made many botanical expeditions in Victoria and along the Queensland coast on the Spitfire in 1860, at Mount Elliot with botanist John Dallachy in 1863 and in the Daintree area in 1875, before arriving in Cairns in 1886. He developed nurseries in Geelong, Brisbane and Bowen and collected specimens for the Herbarium of Victoria. A number of Fitzalan's specimens were sent to Kew Gardens, London, where they were examined by taxonomist George Bentham for inclusion in the botanical volumes of Flora australiensis.

In 1861 Fitzalan went with his wife and family in the Jeanie Dove with Captain Henry Daniel Sinclair to help to found Bowen, the first town in North Queensland. Fitzalan was awarded an official contract worth £1125 to build government housing in Port Denison (as Bowen was then known). To fulfil this contract, he employed timber workers to fell and prepare the large hoop pine found on the nearby Whitsunday Island. He oversaw the work personally and found it necessary to have his logging camp protected by a detachment of Native Police under the command of Lieut. Powell. Fitzalan chartered the schooner 'Buonaparte' to transport the timber to Port Denison. On one trip, Fitzalan loaded 37,000 feet (11,000 m) of prepared hoop pine and 40,000 shingles. Disagreements between Fitzalan and other local officials over the logging and building contracts saw delays to the actual construction of the buildings. As a result of Fitzalan's logging ventures in the area, several places are named after him, including Fitzalan Island and Fitzalan passage near Whitsunday Island. Fitzalan's interest in developing the area is reflected in his 1872 poem in which he envisions each of the Whitsunday Islands being owned individually by notable Bowen residents who would replace the forests with grand houses and gardens.

In December 1886 the Cairns Municipal Council came to an agreement with Eugene Fitzalan, a trained botanist, to establish an ornamental garden on a recreation reserve (now the Flecker Botanical Gardens), sufficiently attractive to entice the public. In return Fitzalan was permitted to sell refreshments (which would enhance the public appeal of the gardens) and to operate a private commercial nursery from the reserve. He was appointed caretaker of the reserve with a nominal annual salary of £5. Fitzalan developed about 5 acres (2 hectares) in the northeast of the reserve as an ornamental botanic garden (then known variously as Rosebank or Fitzalan's Botanical Gardens), largely on the site of earlier Chinese market gardens. An 1891 survey plan indicates that Fitzalan's early gardens were located on section 75, just south of Collins Avenue, below what is now the Tanks Arts Centre. This was a short distance from the railway line near the cutting at the Three Mile, where the Edge Hill railway station was constructed in 1888–1889. Access to the gardens was made easier in 1887 when a crossing was made over Saltwater Creek.

Between 1887 and 1891 Fitzalan landscaped the ground, planted colourful garden beds and constructed a perimeter fence to keep out goats. He built a small cottage in the garden and established the Edge Hill Nursery, constructing a long shed roofed with coarse canvas in which he raised seedlings and cuttings and in 1887 cut a main garden path, about 9 feet (2.7 m) wide, through the reserve at his own expense, planting specimen and fruit trees along its length. In 1891 this pathway was surveyed as Edge Hill Road (Collins Avenue from 1934). He also formed other paths opening off this track, including a circular walking track through the rainforest.

Among the plants cultivated by Fitzalan were 50 varieties of roses, 11 varieties of hibiscus, orchids, ferns, rain trees, native myrtle and local plants from the adjacent Mt Whitfield Range. He also grew coffee, and grafted orange, lemons and mangoes, which he made available to residents of the area. He exported large numbers of orchids, palms and palm seeds, ferns and other plants to Europe, and received specimens from other parts of Australia to trial in a tropical environment.

== Later life ==
Fitzalan relinquished his caretaker role of the botanical gardens in 1897 due to poor health.

Fitzalan died in Brisbane on 20 June 1911. He was buried in the South Brisbane Cemetery on 21 June 1911.

== Named in his honour ==
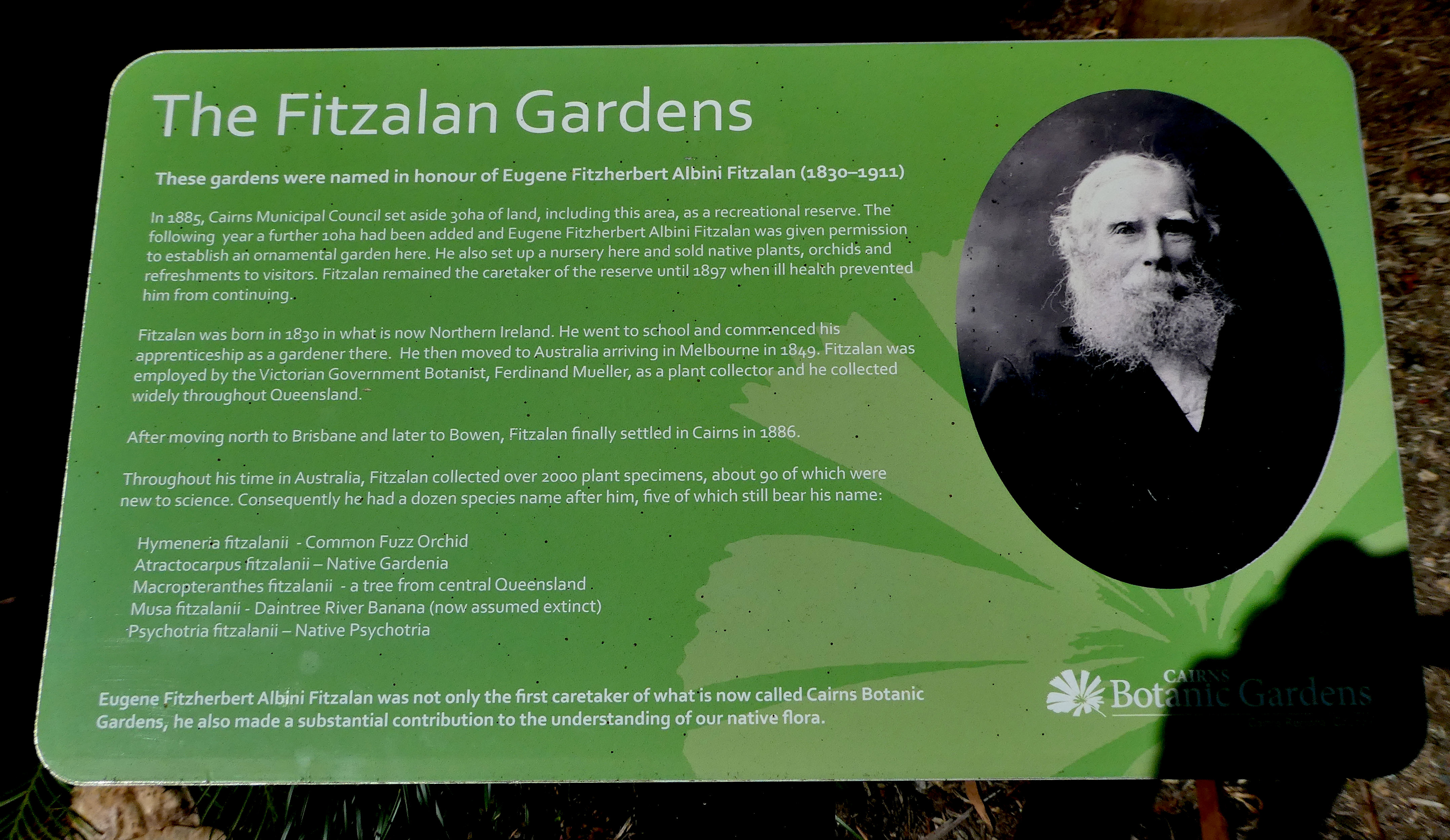
Plaque commemorating Eugene Fitzalan

A number of plant species are named after him, including Randia fitzalanii (now Atractocarpus fitzalanii), Eria fitzalanii (now Pinalia fitzalanii), Eulophia fitzalanii (now Eulophia bicallosa), Lepistemon fitzalanii (now Lepistemon urceolatus), Macropteranthes fitzalanii, Musa fitzalanii, Erythrina fitzalanii (now Erythrina variegata), and Psychotria fitzalanii. The genus Fitzalania (now Meiogyne) is also named for him.

An area within the Cairns Botanical Gardens is named Fitzalan Gardens in his honour. The Fitzalan Gardens consists of three separate gardens, connected by paths and footbridges and feature a water lily pond and giant mature palm trees. There is also a plaque commemorating his achievements.
