= Flecker Botanical Gardens =

Flecker Botanical Gardens (Cairns Botanic Gardens)
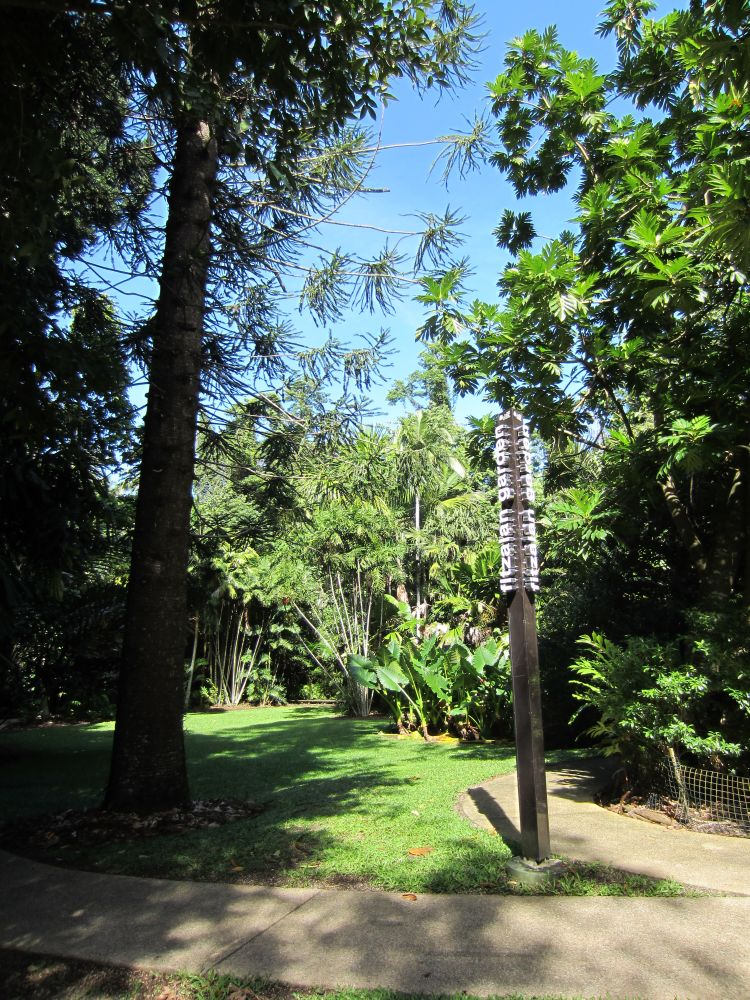
- Fleckers Botanic Gardens, 2015

- Location within Queensland Location within Australia
- 16.8991°S 145.7476°E
- Location: Collins Avenue, Edge Hill, Cairns, Cairns Region, Queensland, Australia

History
- Design period: 1870s–1890s (late 19th century)
- Built: 1886–1960s

Queensland Heritage Register
- Official name: Flecker Botanical Gardens, Cairns Botanic Gardens, Edge Hill Nursery, Fitzalan's Botanical Gardens
- Type: state heritage (landscape, built)
- Designated: 2 February 2007
- Reference no.: 602541
- Significant period: 1880s–1982 (fabric); 1880s–1960s (historical); 1880s– (social)
- Significant components: natural landscape, bridge – foot/pedestrian, paving, wall/s – retaining, gate – entrance, office/administration building, garden – layout, fernery, pathway/walkway, garden – rainforest, trees/plantings, lawn/s, garden – bed/s, road/roadway

Flecker Botanic Gardens is a heritage-listed botanic garden at Collins Avenue, Edge Hill, Queensland, Australia. It was built from 1886 to 1960s. It is now known as Cairns Botanic Gardens. It was added to the Queensland Heritage Register on 2 February 2007.

== History ==
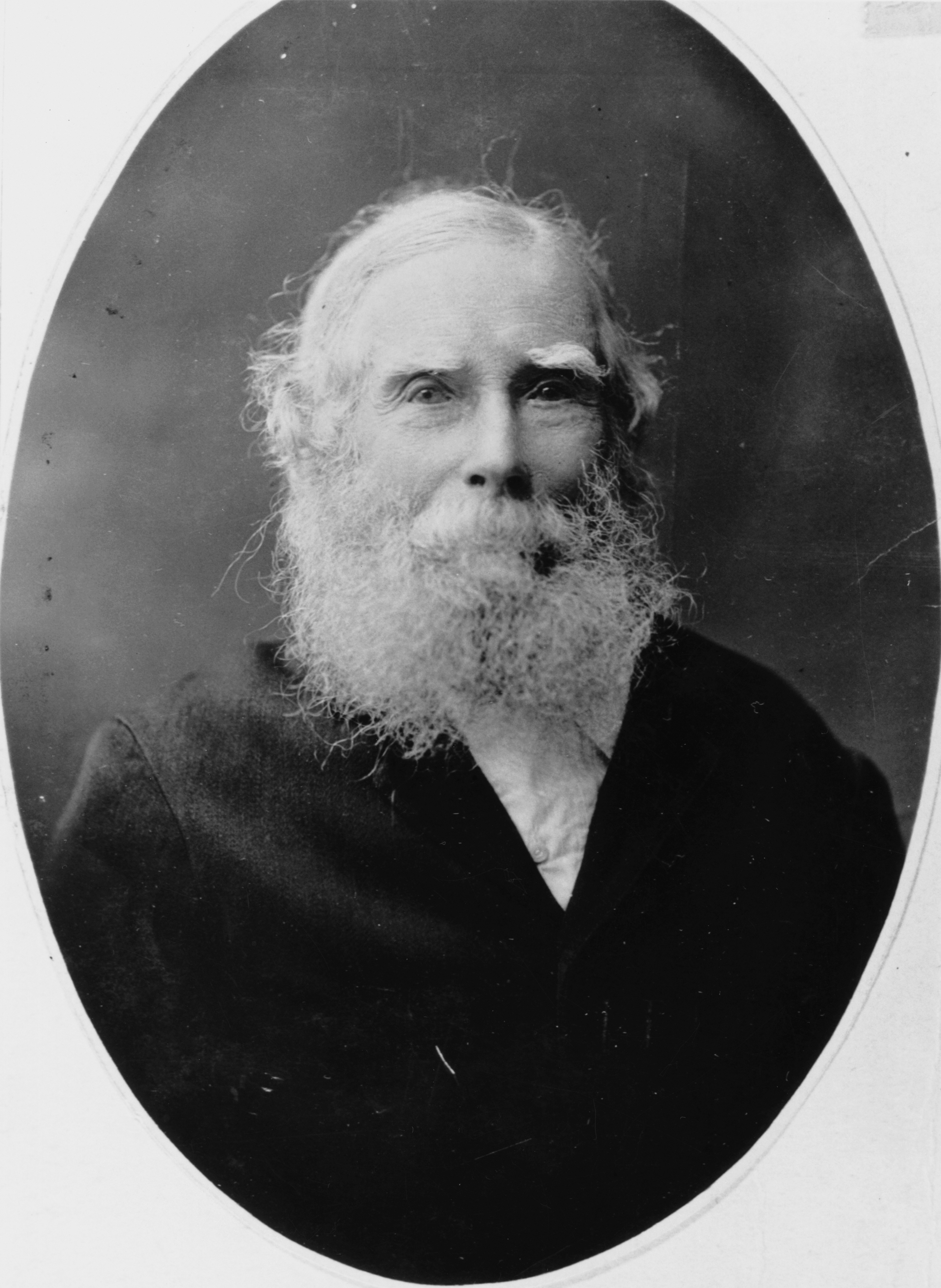
Eugene Fitzalan, botanist on the Dalrymple Expedition of 1861

The Flecker Botanic Gardens, a public reserve south of Mt Islay in the Mt Whitfield Range, was established in the mid-1880s as part of a recreation reserve, just a decade after the town of Cairns was first surveyed in 1876 as a port to service the Hodgkinson goldfield. Although never officially gazetted for botanic garden purposes, botanic gardens were developed in the recreation reserve at its inception. The work of botanist Eugene Fitzalan in the 1880s and 1890s, Cairns City Council nurserymen and curators from the 1920s and naturalist Dr Hugo Flecker from the 1930s to the 1950s, has contributed to the development of the gardens as a significant botanic and recreation space in Cairns. Of cultural heritage significance the garden area is bounded by Collins Avenue and McCormack, Goodwin and McDonnell Streets.

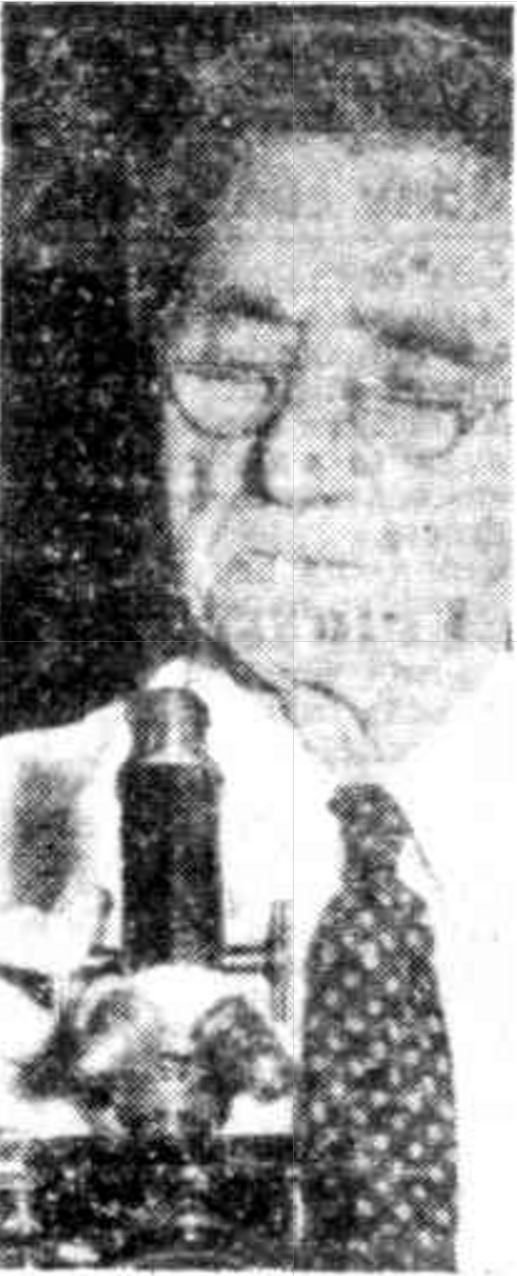
Hugo Flecker, at the microscope in his laboratory, 1953

In 1884 the Cairns Progress Association had advocated for a botanic garden to be established in the vicinity of Cairns. During the 19th and early 20th centuries botanic gardens were considered important for recreation, the preservation of indigenous vegetation, the display of native flora and fauna, and the acclimatisation of economically useful plants. In November 1886 an area of about 71 acres (29 ha) west and south of Mount Islay, comprising suburban sections 71, 74, 75 and 76 (surveyed in 1885), was gazetted as a temporary reserve for recreation under the control of Cairns Municipal Council (established in 1885). This land comprised the southern and western foothills of Mt Islay and a lowland swamp.

Previous non-indigenous use of the land had been restricted to timber cutting, the forming of tracks through the rainforest scrub to assist with timber extraction, and Chinese market garden cultivation in the northeast corner of the reserve. The site was located approximately three miles (4.8 km) from the centre of Cairns adjacent to the recently surveyed Cairns to Kuranda railway right of way, which would make it publicly accessible. In April 1887 suburban section 68 was added, to create a reserve of over 97 acres (39 ha). A further 11 acres (4.5 ha) was added in May 1892, when swampy land lying between the recreation reserve and the railway line was incorporated into the reserve, including an area at the foot of Mount Islay, west of Saltwater Creek, previously cultivated by Chinese market gardeners under special lease.

In December 1886 the Cairns Municipal Council came to an agreement with Eugene Fitzalan, a trained botanist, to establish an ornamental garden on the recreation reserve, sufficiently attractive to entice the public. In return Fitzalan was permitted to sell refreshments (which would enhance the public appeal of the gardens) and to operate a private commercial nursery from the reserve. He was appointed caretaker of the reserve with a nominal annual salary of £5.

Eugene Fitzherbert Albini Fitzalan (1830–1911) was born in Derry, Ireland, and was a botanical collector in England and Mexico before arriving in Australia in 1849. He was a keen orchid collector, and on at least one occasion collected with Baron von Mueller, who regarded Fitzalan's specimens very highly. Fitzalan had at least two orchids named after him by von Mueller. He made many botanical expeditions in Victoria and along the Queensland coast on the Spitfire in 1860, at Mount Elliot with botanist John Dallachy in 1863 and in the Daintree area in 1875, before arriving in Cairns in 1886. He developed nurseries in Geelong, Brisbane and Bowen and collected specimens for the Herbarium of Victoria. A number of Fitzalan's specimens were sent to Kew Gardens, London, where they were examined by taxonomist George Bentham for inclusion in the botanical volumes of Flora australiensis. At least nine plant specimens were named after him: Pinalia fitzalanii, Eulophia fitzalanii, Lepistemon fitzalanii, Macropteranthes fitzalanii, Musa fitzalanii, Psychotria fitzalanii, and Atractocarpus fitzalanii. The last of these is a native gardenia that has been extensively planted as a street tree in Cairns.

Fitzalan developed about 5 acres (2.0 ha) in the northeast of the reserve as an ornamental botanic garden (known variously as Rosebank or Fitzalan's Botanical Gardens), largely on the site of earlier Chinese market gardens. An 1891 survey plan indicates that Fitzalan's early gardens were located on section 75, just south of Collins Avenue, below what is now the Tanks Arts Centre. This was a short distance from the railway line near the cutting at the Three Mile, where the Edge Hill railway station was constructed in 1888–1889. Access to the gardens was made easier in 1887 when a crossing was made over Saltwater Creek.

Between 1887 and 1891 Fitzalan landscaped the ground, planted colourful garden beds and constructed a perimeter fence to keep out goats. He built a small cottage in the garden and established the Edge Hill Nursery, constructing a long shed roofed with coarse canvas in which he raised seedlings and cuttings and in 1887 cut a main garden path, about 9 feet (2.7 m) wide, through the reserve at his own expense, planting specimen and fruit trees along its length. In 1891 this pathway was surveyed as Edge Hill Road (Collins Avenue from 1934). He also formed other paths opening off this track, including a circular walking track through the rainforest.

Among the plants cultivated by Fitzalan were 50 varieties of roses, 11 varieties of hibiscus, orchids, ferns, rain trees, native myrtle and local plants from the adjacent Mt Whitfield Range. He also grew coffee, and grafted orange, lemons and mangoes, which he made available to residents of the area. He exported large numbers of orchids, palms and palm seeds, ferns and other plants to Europe, and received specimens from other parts of Australia to trial in a tropical environment. Fitzalan relinquished his caretaker role in 1897 due to poor health. In 1906 the Cairns Council Nursery was established. The function of this nursery was the propagation of plants and shrubs to supply municipal needs.

Fitzalan's garden and nursery continued on this site under the curatorship of James Morgan (1897–1900) and Charles Gurd (1901–1906) until it was moved to its current site in 1906. Charles Gurd continued as curator until 1923 when Les Wright was appointed nurseryman.

In December 1921 the reserve was declared a permanent recreation reserve of 109.5 acres (44.3 ha) under the trusteeship of Cairns Town Council. In 1923 Les Wright was appointed as Council's nurseryman a position he held until 1947. Wright was permitted to construct a house (no longer standing) on the reserve, adjacent to the nursery.

From the early 1930s there were community calls for the establishment of a formal botanical garden within the recreation reserve. Momentum came largely from Dr Hugo Flecker (1884–1957) and the North Queensland Naturalist Club, which he founded in 1932. Melbourne-born Flecker was a radiologist with a strong interest in natural history, especially toxic plants and animals. He undertook valuable work on the Queensland Finger Cherry and the Tar Tree and identified the deadly box jelly, Chironex fleckeri. From 1935 he contributed a weekly column to the Cairns Post on behalf of the Naturalist Club, in which he publicly advocated the establishment of a botanic garden at the recreation reserve.

In 1933, with encouragement from the Queensland Government Botanist, Cyril White, Flecker established the North Queensland Naturalists' Club Herbarium in the grounds of the council's nursery in the recreation reserve. The club's collection grew from around 1,600 specimens in 1937 to about 5,000 in 1950 and an estimated final collection size of around 10,680 specimens. The collection proved popular with visitors, enhancing their experiences of the gardens. Until 1949 specimens were housed at the gardens in a storeroom supplied and erected by the Cairns City Council, then the collection was moved to the former Kuranda Barracks on the Cairns Esplanade. It returned briefly to the Cairns Botanic Gardens from 1967 to 1971, but is now fully incorporated in the general collection at the CSIRO Division of Forest Research at Atherton.

In 1934–35 a significant advance was made with around 25 acres (10 ha) of the reserve on the lower slopes of Mt Islay cleared of heavy undergrowth and planted with young trees. The mayor of Cairns advised that the reserve would be planted with "permanent trees which are noteworthy for their ornamentation and their regularity of design, planted at pre-determined distances, so that they will provide permanent avenues of great beauty." Trees and shrubs of a less "permanent" nature were to be removed and relocated to other parts of the reserve allowing for the development of avenues lined with pine, acacia, palms, Poinciana and others. This project continued until 1940 when part of the recreation reserve (suburban section 74, north of the council nursery) was converted to a Quarry Reserve for war purposes and part of the 1930s gardens work was destroyed by quarrying. It appears that oil palms, poincianas, hoop pines, two rubber trees, a Dillenia, a Schizolobium, an Indian mango, a Wongi plum, a Terminalia and a Malay Apple were planted during this period by Les Wright.

As part of the re-development and in common with formal Botanic gardens, in 1936 the Cairns City Council established a zoological garden in the reserve, to display native birds and animals. This enhanced the appeal of the gardens to visitors, locals and tourists alike, and was popular with American and Australian soldiers during World War II. Les Wright was appointed curator. Succeeding curators continued to build up the collection but the zoo was closed in 1953 for economic reasons.

Following Wright's death in 1947, Tom Mitchell was appointed to the curator's position. He held this position until his death in 1953. A red brick house was built for Mitchell in the early 1950s. This house today houses the Garden's information centre and administration offices. Mitchell died in 1953 and the position was taken up by Jim Gould until 1966.

In 1966, Cairns City Council appointed Vince Winkel as Curator of Parks, Gardens and Reserves, a position he held until 1984, and in March 1967 adopted a five-year plan to develop 8 acres (3.2 ha) in the northwest of the Edge Hill reserve as a small botanical gardens. Collins Avenue and McCormack, Goodwin and McDonnell streets bordered the site. Winkel designed the new garden, laying out a figure-of-eight walkway. The site was cut diagonally by a small creek over which a bridge was erected, and the banks of the creek were planted with various trees including Cassia, Bauhinias, Parka, Caesalpina, Tabebuia and Semecarpus australiensis, known as the Tar tree.

Galvanised pipe railings were placed as needed and where necessary banks were retained with a variety of materials, predominantly small concrete slabs. Garden beds and path edges were built up and retained with flat and smooth river stones. A variety of materials were used for paving in this area: bricks, broken concrete slabs set into the path, and concrete "crazy paving". Walking areas such as footbridges and steps were rendered "non-slip" with the application of exposed aggregate concrete.

The focal point in the centre of the figure of eight was a fernery, constructed in 1968 to house the fern collection of the early and influential Munro-Martin family. It featured a miniature waterfall and pond with water lilies and fish. Near the fernery was the Curator's office which housed the Flecker Herbarium, a grass hut used as a shelter shed, and a picnic area with swings and a large dug out canoe for children to play in.

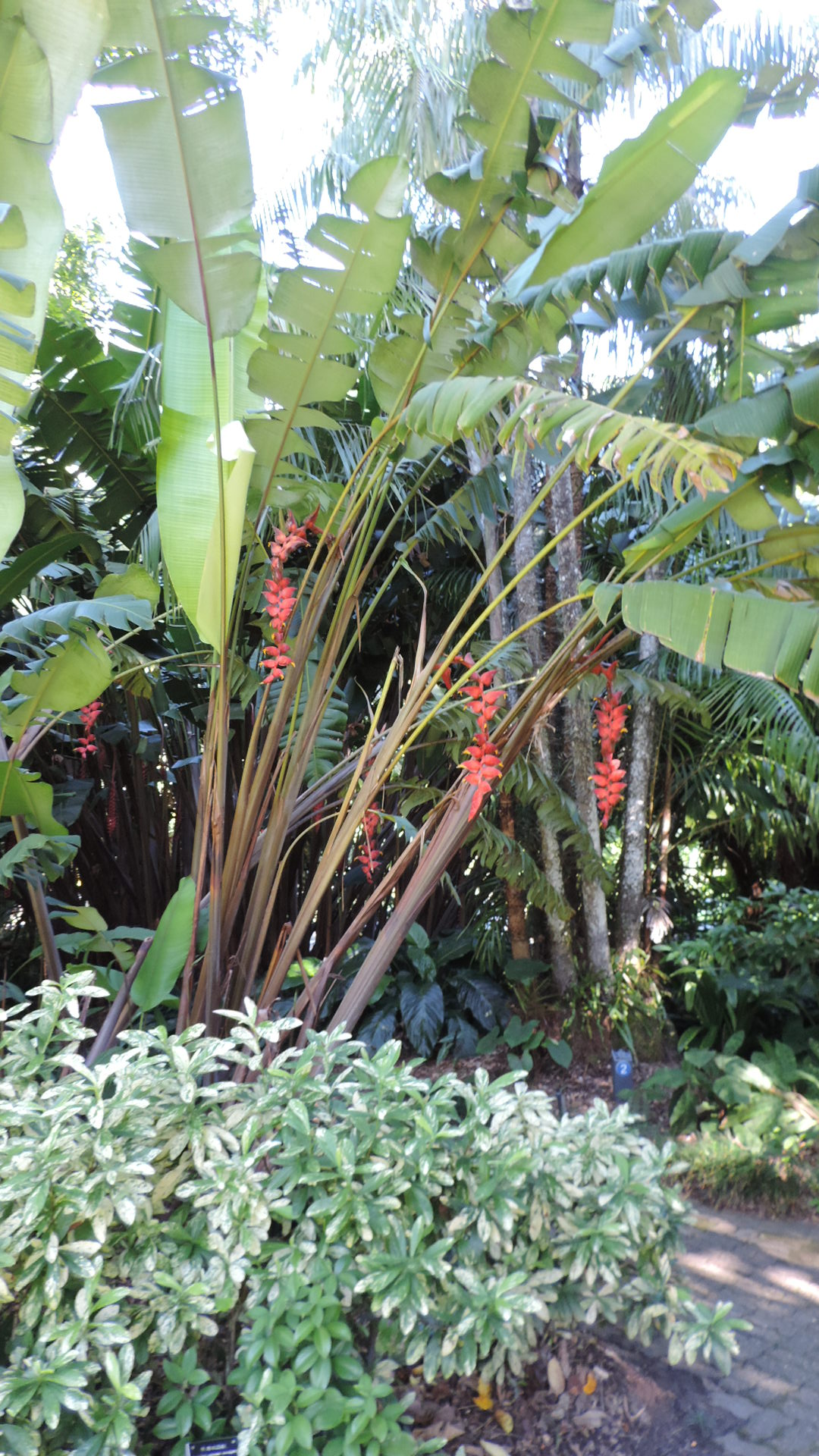
Botanic Gardens, 2018

In 1971, the Cairns City Council named its new garden the Flecker Botanic Gardens to commemorate Dr Flecker's contribution to botany. (The name has since been applied to the whole of the recreation reserve). At this time there was a collection of over 100 different species of native orchids growing on a line of palms, and over 100 species of palms including oil palms and royal palms in the area facing Collins Avenue. North of this area and facing McCormack Street was a densely wooded area containing earlier plantings. After 1966 this area was cleared of lantana and undergrowth and pathways established. Among the plantings at this time were coffee, tea, cocoa, turmeric, ginger, curry leaf and other medicinal plants including Taraktogenos from Burma. The largest tree in this area at this time was the Samanea saman or Rain Tree from South America, and well advanced were two Hevea brasiliensis, a source of rubber, ready for tapping. A "fine specimen" of breadfruit was growing in front of the curator's office in 1973.

In 1974, the Flecker Botanic Gardens was listed in the International Directory of Botanical Gardens, following an invitation received from the Association of Botanical Gardens (now The Botanic Gardens Conservation International) in Edinburgh. At this period the gardens held an amazing variety and quantity of ferns, some of which were exceptionally rare. Flecker Botanic Gardens remains a member of this Association.

During the 1970s the Flecker Botanic Gardens contributed to plant exchanges with overseas agencies, the acclimatisation of plants, and cataloguing plants for ready reference. Visitor experience and enjoyment was enhanced with the addition of aviaries in 1974 to house pheasants, peacocks and bush turkeys, and the children's playground was extended with the installation of a tree house.

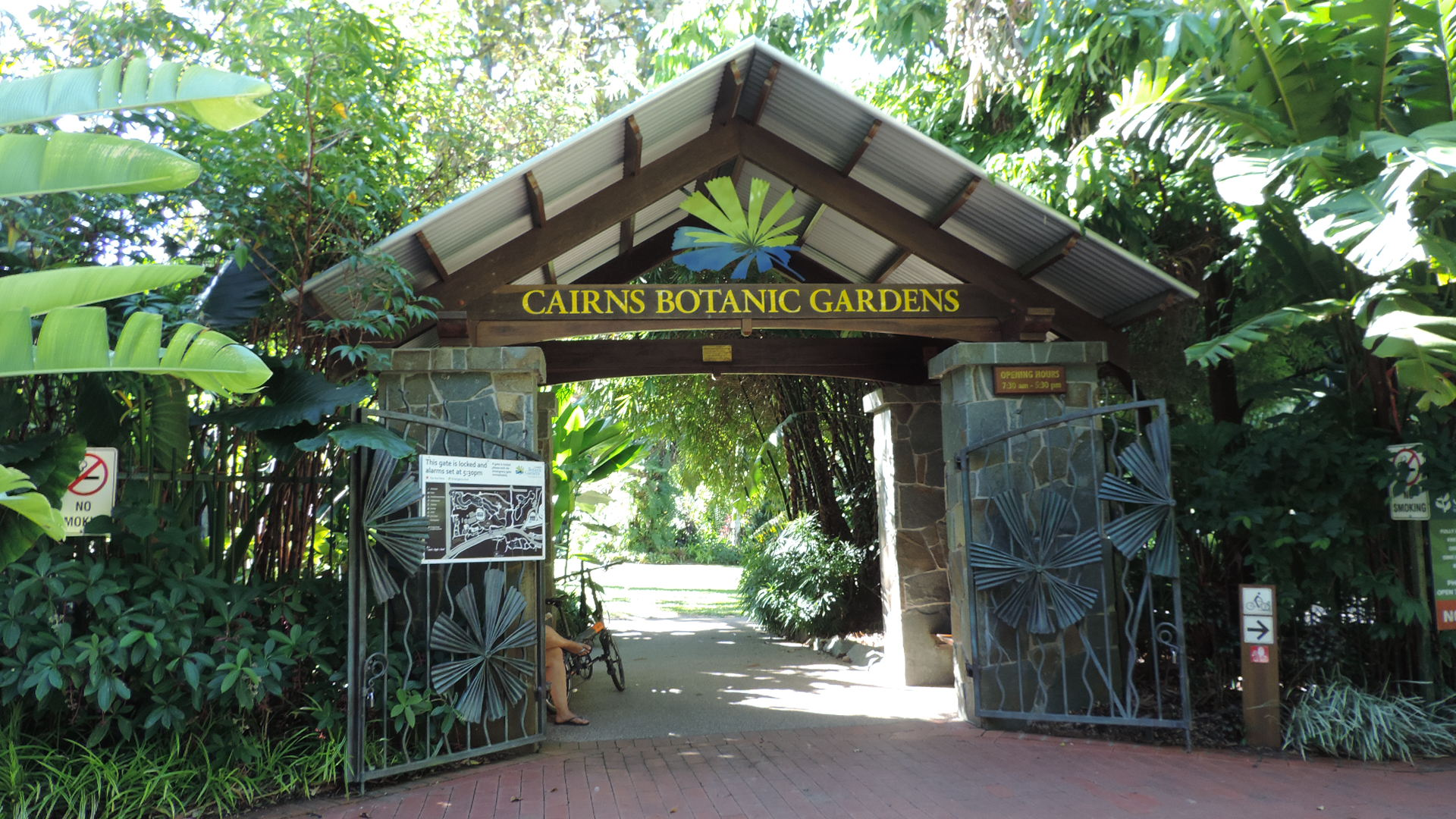
Entrance, 2018

In 1982, new entrance gates were erected at the 1971 Flecker Botanic Gardens to commemorate the 50th anniversary of the founding of the North Queensland Naturalists' Club.

Cyclones have had a significant and devastating effect on the flora of the botanical gardens. In February 1986 Cyclone Winifred caused extensive damage and many trees, some nearly 100 years old, were severely damaged. A number of plants were lost at this time to theft.

Following the cyclone a three-year plan was implemented by Cairns City Council to upgrade the gardens. This included the redevelopment of the Munro-Martin Fernery and the orchid propagation house; tree labelling including Braille tree labels; continuation of botanic records; construction of paving; and an Aboriginal wild food walk. A restaurant was constructed near the curator's office, opening in January 1987. At this time tourist operators considered the Flecker Botanic Gardens the third most popular tourist attraction in the region, with a visitor rate of 100,000 per annum.

Public awareness of the gardens increased with the formation of the Friends of the Botanical Gardens in 1989. During the 1990s the educative function of the botanic garden was emphasised. Interpretative services and guided walks were introduced and an annual Botanical Garden Festival introduced.

Flecker Botanic Gardens continues its important botanic role, extending its collection of endangered species from the Wet Tropics World Heritage Area and providing assistance to both national and international scientific work. The garden maintains national and international memberships such as the Royal Australian Institute of Parks and Recreation, and Botanic Gardens Conservation International, and is noted nationally and internationally for its collections of palms, gingers and aroids.

== Description ==
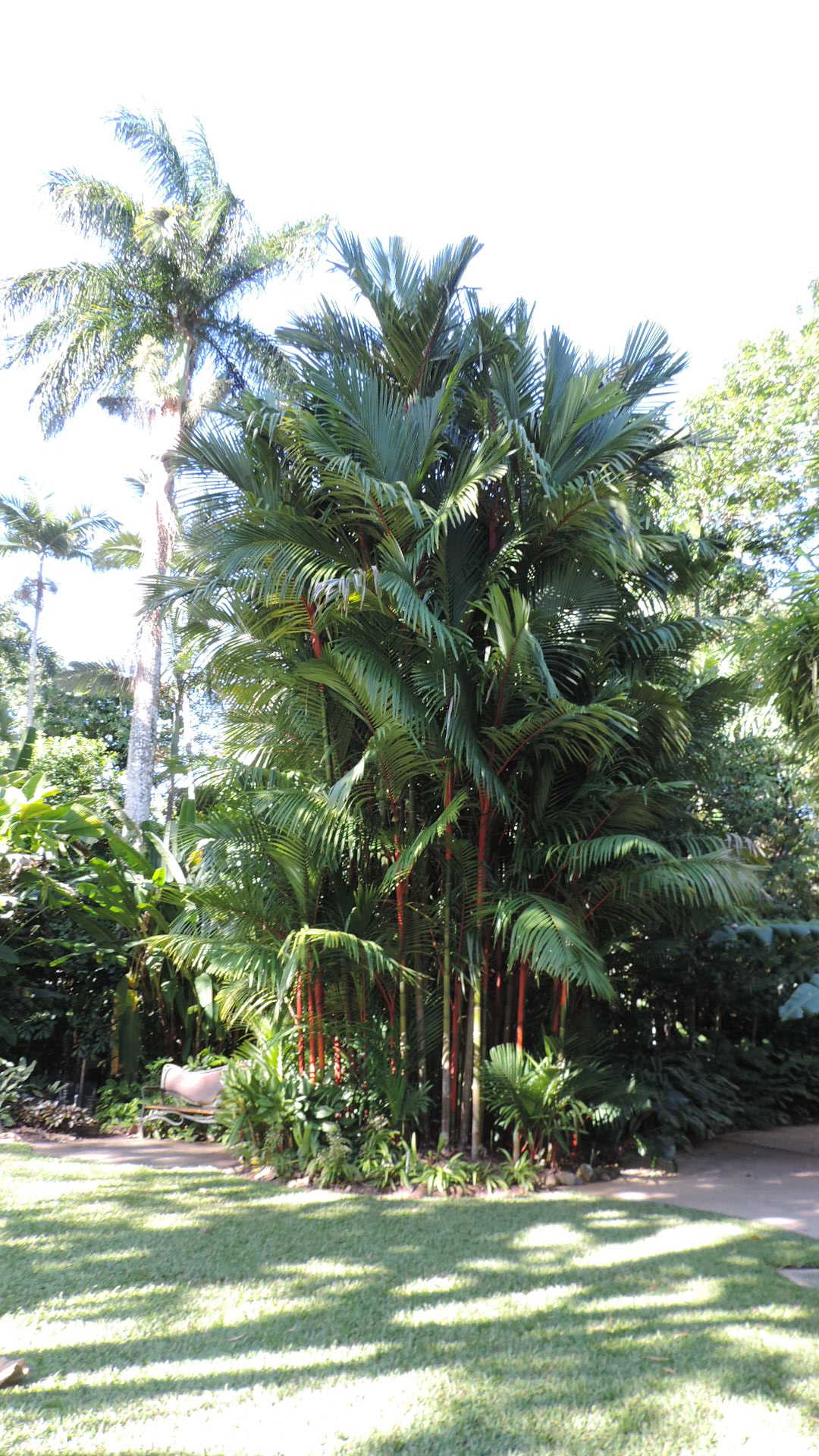
Botanic Gardens, 2018

The Flecker Botanic Gardens is bounded by Collins Avenue and McCormack, Goodwin and MacDonnell streets. Some plantings in this area need to be considered with respect to their possible age. The corner of Collins Avenue and McCormack Street along the western boundary has a group planting including two very large hoop pines Araucaria cunninghamii, a Cook pine Araucaria columnaris, a sausage tree Kigelia pinnata, and a large fig tree Ficus spp. The association of these species in botanical gardens was not uncommon in the late 19th century, as at Queens Park, Maryborough.

Further north of this group of plants, towards Goodwin Street, the association of a particularly large rain tree with a blue quandong, a damson plum, a clump of bamboo of the same species as that in the Fitzalan Gardens and mature mangoes, is seen.

Rainforest understorey plants line the creek bank and pathways in this area and again the association of a blue quandong, paperbarks and a Leichhardt tree is seen. The 1960s figure-of-eight walkway has persisted and Fitzalan Creek is crossed by two footbridges. The southern portion of the gully area has the oldest paving. A variety of paving materials are used, including bricks, concrete slabs and concrete "crazy paving." Retaining walls reflect this pattern: log retaining walls and concrete stone pitching in southern parts give way to block walls in northern areas.

The materials used in this work are simple in contrast to the workmanship evident in its execution, which is of an outstanding quality. Railings made of galvanised pipe are placed as needed. Over time a number of these have been replaced with timber railings. Where necessary banks are retained with a variety of materials, predominantly small concrete slabs approximately 75 millimetres (3.0 in) high x 300 millimetres (12 in) long x 250 millimetres (9.8 in) deep, laid into the banks. Garden beds and path edges are built up and retained with flat and smooth rivers stones, generally the size (but not the shape) of lawn bowls balls, bedded horizontally.

Walking areas such as footbridges and steps are rendered "non-slip" with the application of exposed aggregate concrete utilising large river-washed pebbles approximately 20 to 20 to 50 millimetres (0.79 to 1.97 in) in diameter.

Understorey plantings in the Fitzalan Creek gully area have no doubt changed over time. Today aroids, gingers and Asian species dominate the head of the gully and a variety of tropical ground cover species enjoy the canopy provided in the lower area of the gully by remnant vegetation including impressive specimens of the paperbark Melaleuca leucadendron, damson plum and Leichhardt trees.

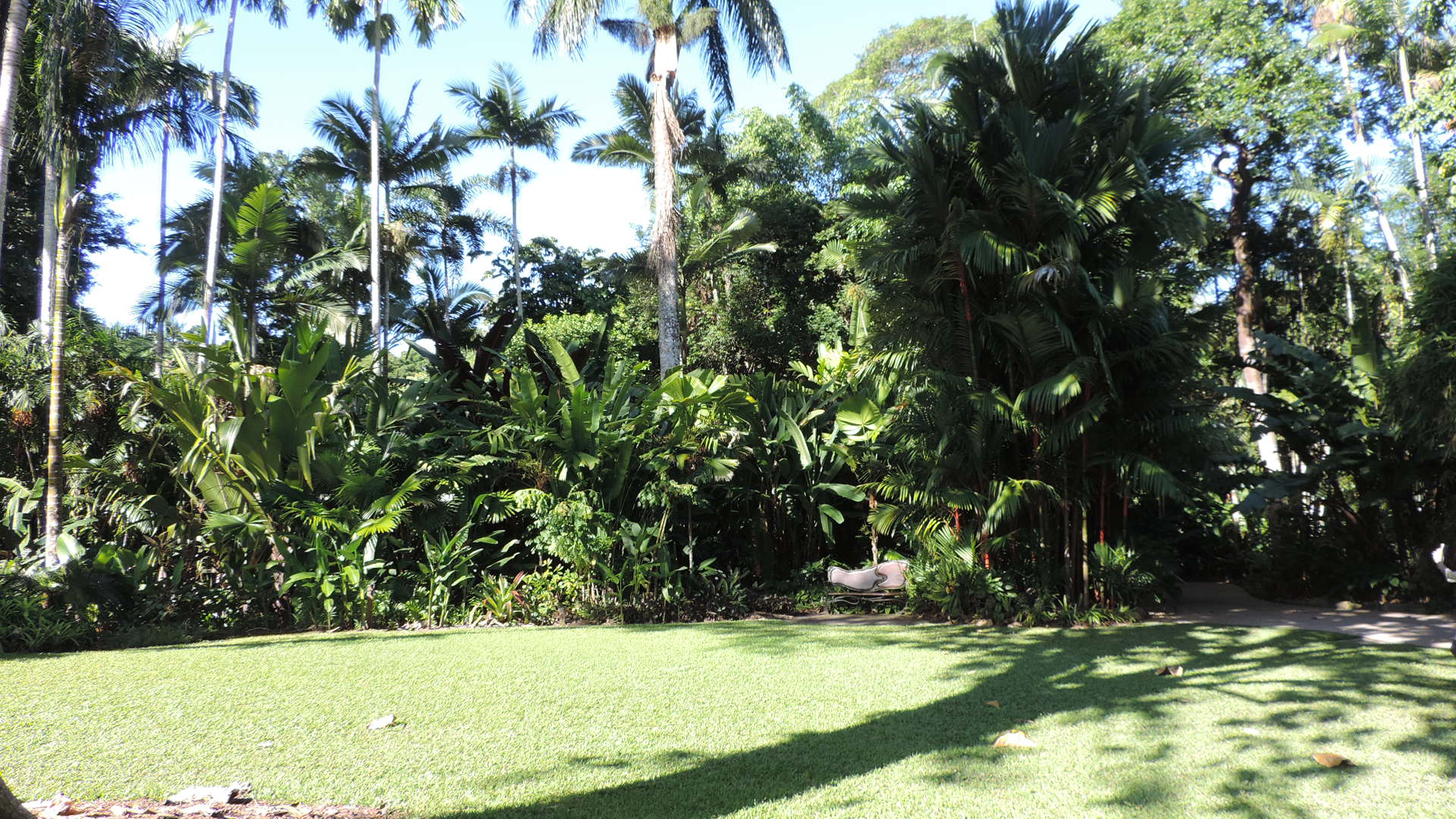
Botanic Gardens, 2018

There are three open lawn areas within the Flecker Botanic Gardens: an area immediately adjacent to the main entry off Collins Avenue; a large open space used for open-air performances and large gatherings in the northeast area of the site adjacent to McDonnell Street; and a tree and shrub lined linear space along Goodwin Street. The main entry lawn has a large teak tree Tectona grandis, planted in 1946, as the centre lawn specimen and the remnants of a large yellow poinciana Peltophorum pterocarpum to the northeast of this. The latter tree shows the scars of significant storm damage over time and today provides the support for a collection of epiphytic plants.

Along the MacDonnell Street boundary and immediately adjacent to the open-air performance area, are a number of very large and mature trees including a Bayur tree Pterospermum acerifolium, a multi-trunked mock orange Murraya exotica, a Cassia javanica, and a multi-trunked Tar tree. These specimens are particularly mature and are species that could well have been used in earlier planting schemes.

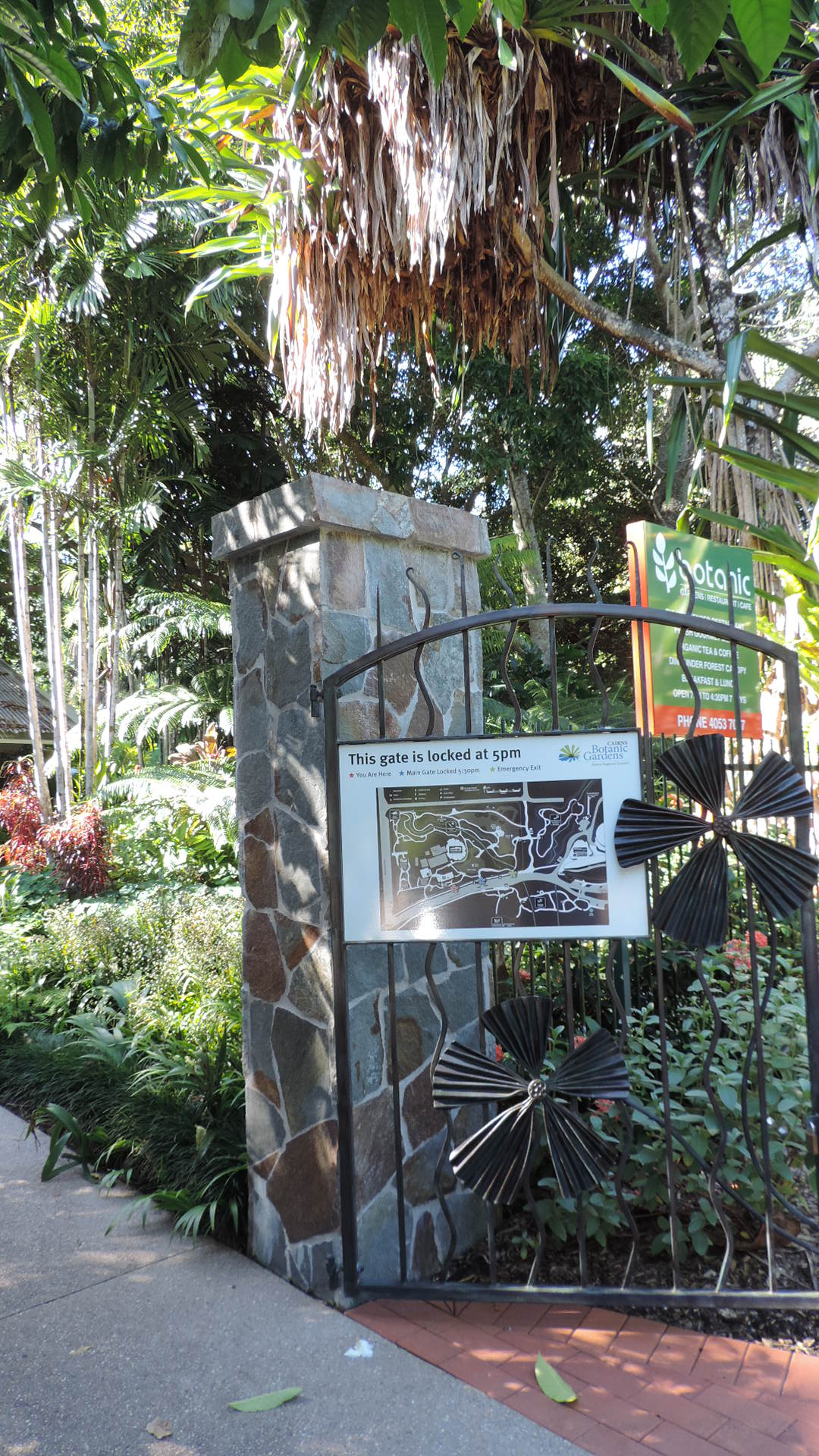
Botanic Gardens, 2018

Buildings have a minimal visual presence on this site. The 1968 Munro-Martin Fernery is constructed of galvanised pipe framing approximately 50 millimetres (2.0 in) in diameter with a central barrel vault and side aisle areas sheeted with galvanised steel mesh and enclosed externally with shade cloth. Timber lattice panels flank the front entrance. The fernery is in clear view across the lawn from the main entrance gate to the Flecker Botanic Gardens. Adjoining the Munro-Martin Fernery to the west is the George Watkins Orchid House (1986) constructed from similar materials but on a smaller scale. Neither of the structures housing the fernery or the orchid collection is considered to be of cultural heritage significance. The commemorative entrance gates (1982) are constructed with decorative stonework.

Other built elements in this area of the gardens lie buried under the exuberant foliage and are "discovered" when wandering the various pathways. These include the red brick curator's office and information centre (1950s), a restaurant (1987) and two toilet blocks. The placement and scale of these buildings on the site is significant, rendering them unobtrusive in the landscape. However, the structures themselves are not considered to be of high cultural heritage significance. Fencing around this area of the gardens is not significant.

== Heritage listing ==
Flecker Botanical Gardens was listed on the Queensland Heritage Register on 2 February 2007 having satisfied the following criteria.

The place is important in demonstrating the evolution or pattern of Queensland's history.

The place demonstrates the development and continued management of a botanic garden in a regional city as a theme in the evolution and pattern of Queensland's history. The Flecker Botanic Gardens (earlier Cairns Botanical Gardens) was established in 1886 as part of a recreation reserve. From the 1930s the Flecker Botanic Gardens has fulfilled the traditional functions of a botanical gardens, including increasing horticultural knowledge about local plants with a view to developing their economic potential, sharing of this knowledge and seed stock with like-minded institutions nationally and internationally, providing an attractive and educative venue for public recreation, and in some instances providing plant material to the public.

The place is important in demonstrating the principal characteristics of a particular class of cultural places.

The place is important in demonstrating the principal characteristics of a substantial wet tropics public botanical gardens that has evolved over time, including early groupings of exotic and indigenous plantings (early to mid 20th century) and the botanical display garden, designed and developed by curator Vince Winkel in the 1960s. Important characteristics also include: infrastructure associated with displaying the gardens, especially that dating from the 1960s-1980s (including the figure-of-eight walkway, other pathways, retaining walls, footbridges, paving, railings, drainage systems, and raised and built up garden beds); the provision of specialist displays; specimen plantings of trees and shrubs; and the incorporation of open lawn areas within the design. The current Gardens, developed during the 1960s demonstrate plantings, displays, plant collections, bridges and visitor facilities similar in concept to other regional botanic gardens.

The place is important because of its aesthetic significance.

The visual display of the plant material in the Flecker Botanic Gardens captures the exuberant ambience associated with imagery of the "lush tropics". Large trees, both native to this habitat and exotic, provide the planting structure and canopy framework for the understorey collection and display of colourful orchids, gingers, aroids and ferns. The natural topography of gentle foothill and slopes, creek, gully and swampland has been sensitively incorporated into the design of the display. The aesthetic of the site has quietly evolved with, and emerged from, its natural environment rather than being designed to dominate and overpower its space in the landscape. This contributes to the enduring charm of the place as a recreational venue.

The place has a special association with the life or work of a particular person, group or organisation of importance in Queensland's history.

The place has a special association with the work of naturalist Dr Hugo Flecker in the mid-20th century. The North Queensland Naturalist Club was established in 1932 by Dr Flecker. He housed its extensive herbarium collection in the gardens from 1933 until 1949. This collection returned to the Flecker Botanic Gardens briefly from 1967 to 1971. It is now incorporated into the CSIRO collection. Since the 1930s, the place has had a special association with the work of the Cairns City Council in developing and promoting the Botanic gardens as a place of recreation and, since the 1960s, as an internationally recognised source of scientific information and education in the wet tropics of Australia.
