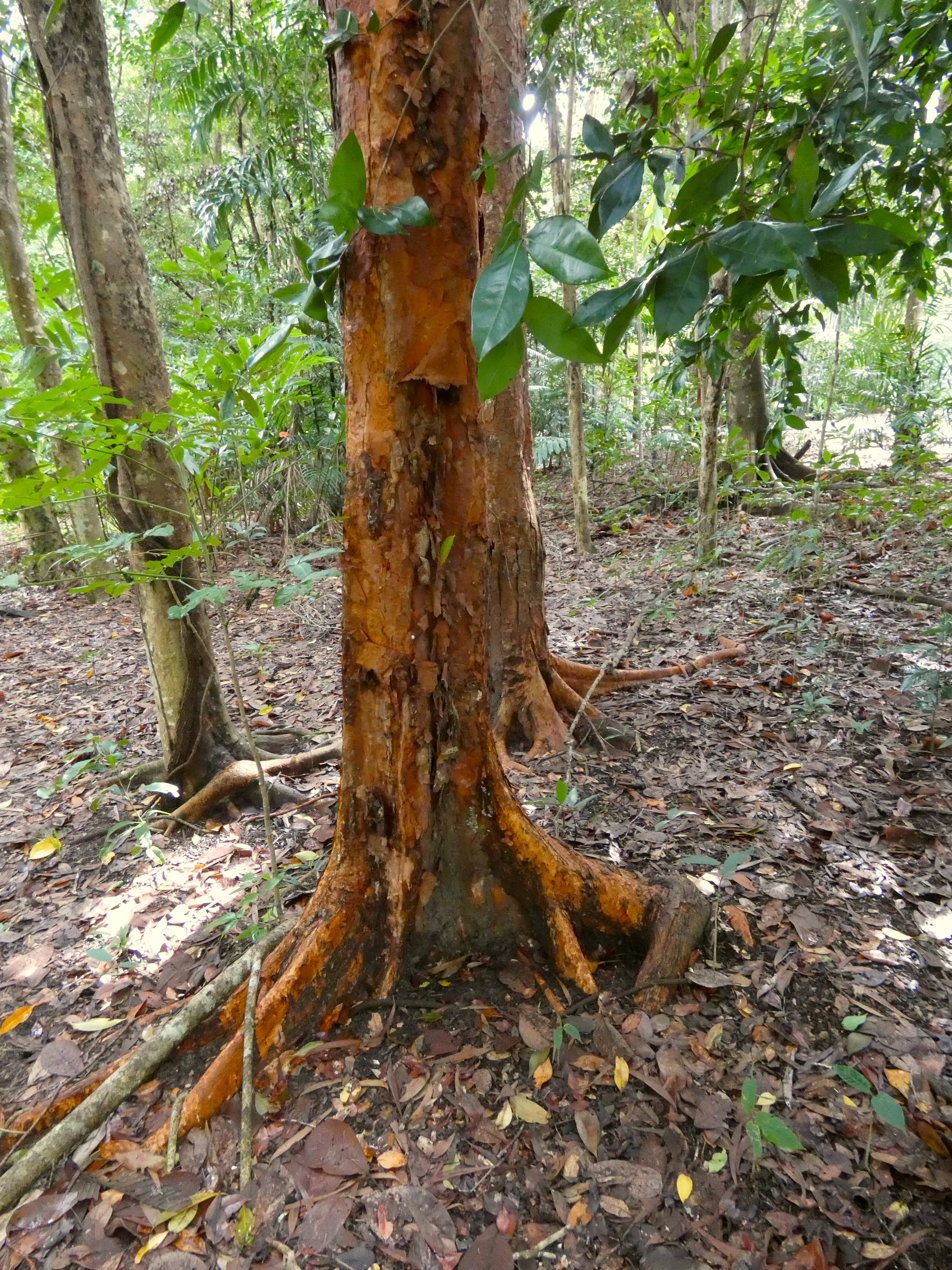
- Growing in the Cairns Botanic Gardens

Conservation status
- Least Concern (NCA)

Scientific classification
- Kingdom: Plantae
- Clade: Tracheophytes
- Clade: Angiosperms
- Clade: Eudicots
- Clade: Rosids
- Order: Myrtales
- Family: Myrtaceae
- Genus: Syzygium
- Species: S. bungadinnia

Binomial name
- Syzygium bungadinnia (F.M.Bailey) B.Hyland

Synonyms
- Eugenia bungadinnia F.M.Bailey

= Syzygium bungadinnia =

Species of flowering plant

Syzygium bungadinnia, commonly known as bungadinnia satinash, is a species of plant in the clove and eucalyptus family Myrtaceae. It is endemic to Cape York Peninsula, Queensland, Australia, where it grows in rainforest and gallery forest. It was first described in 1898.

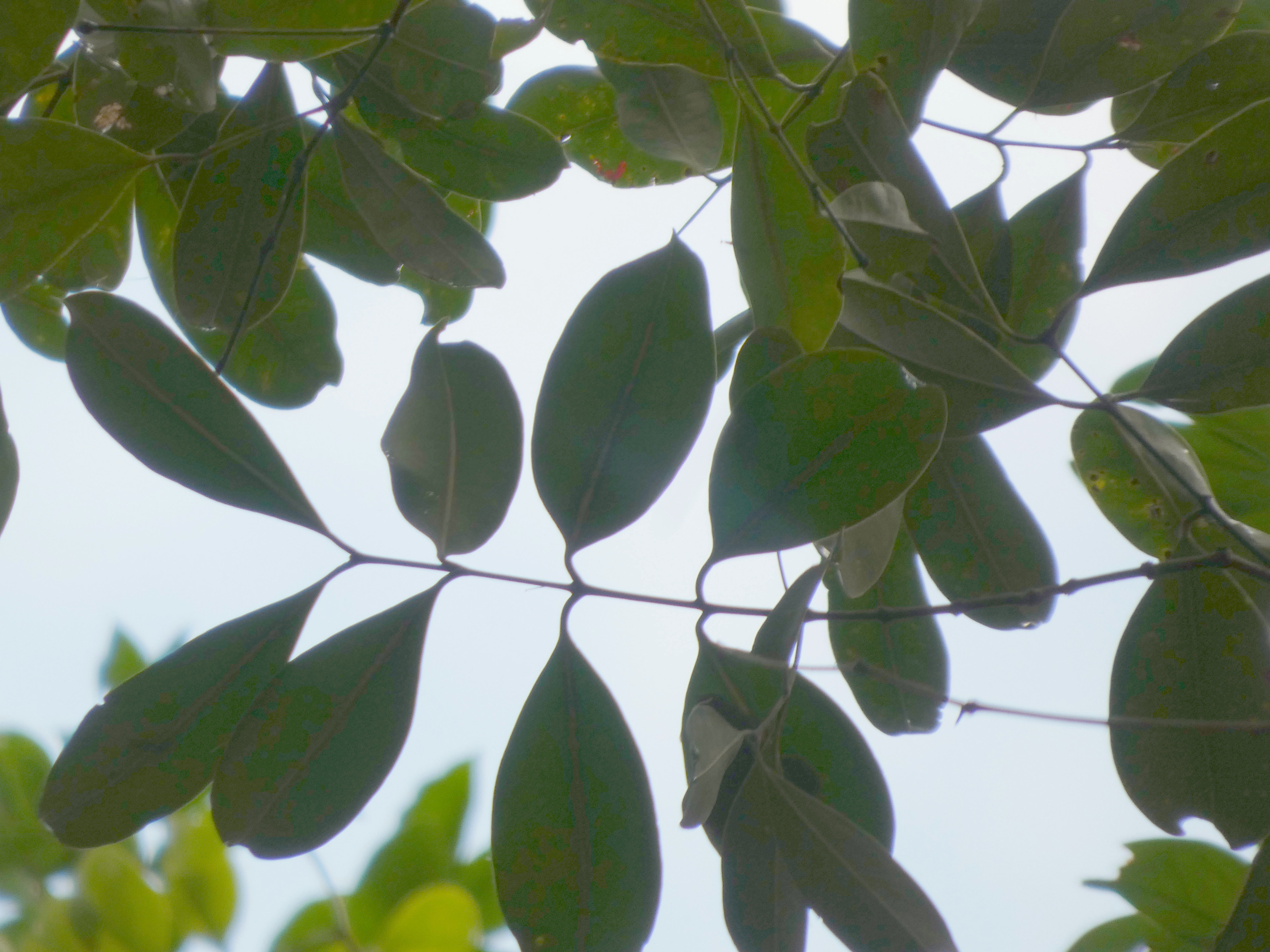
Foliage

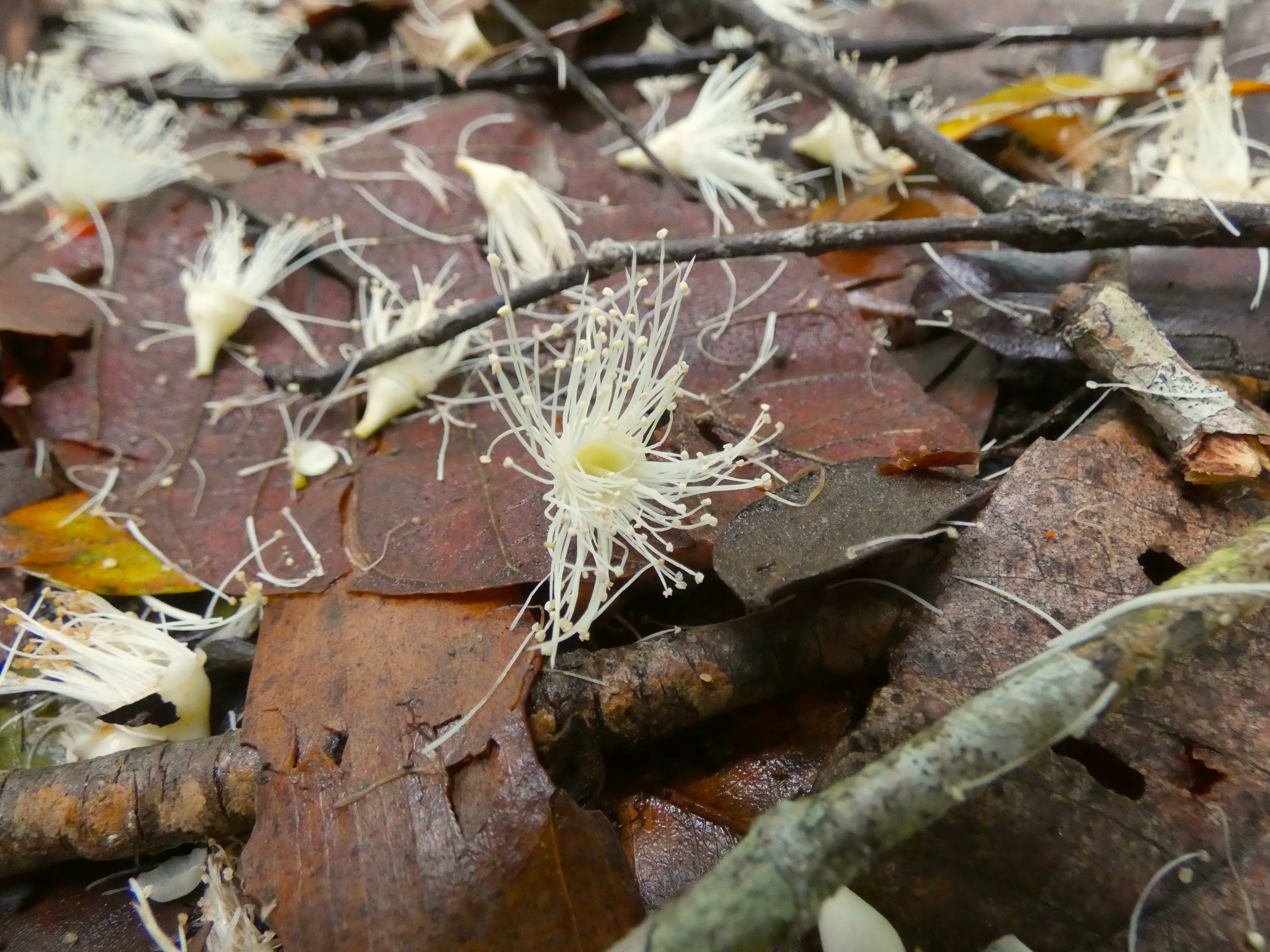
Flowers

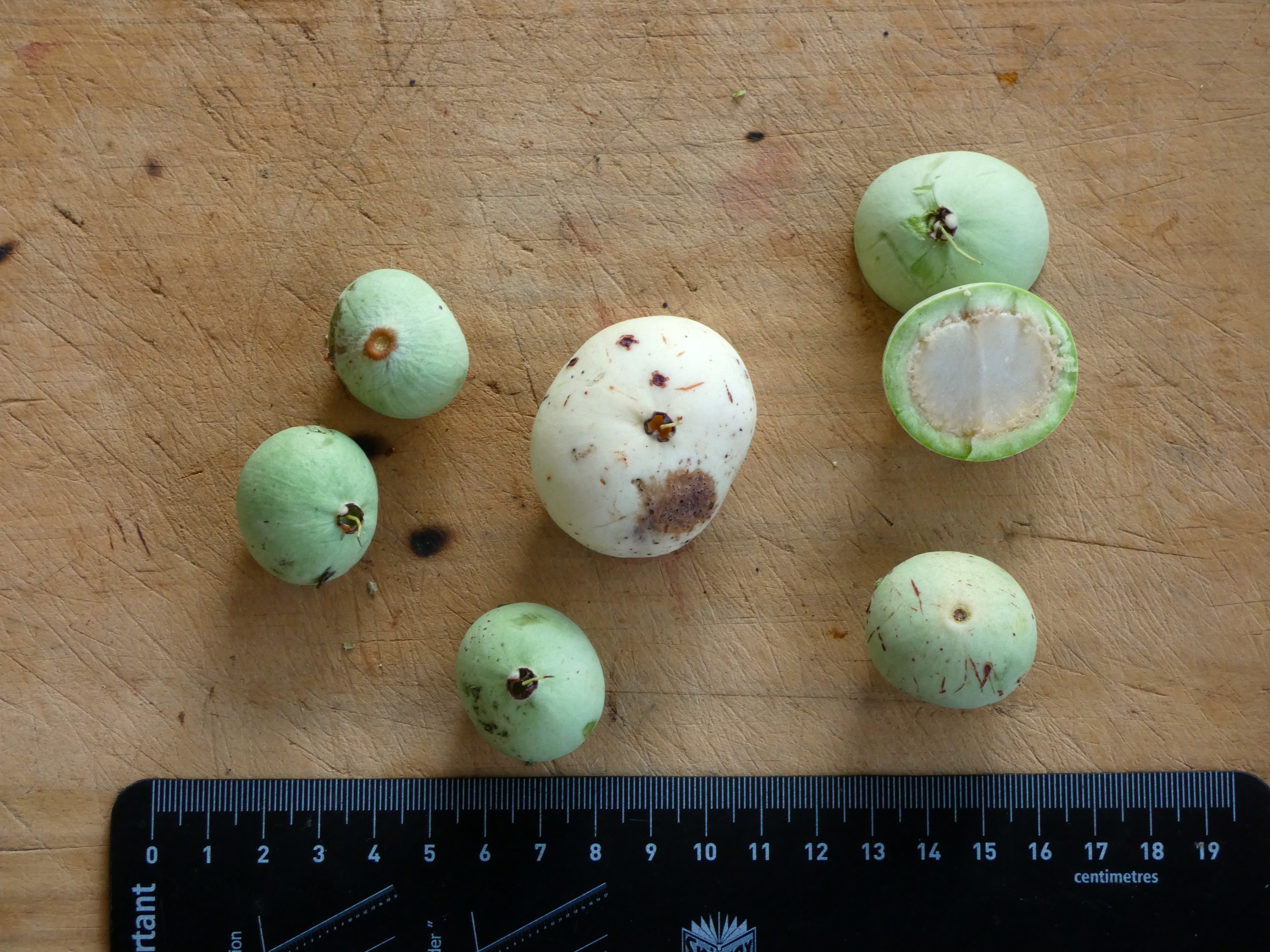
Fruit
