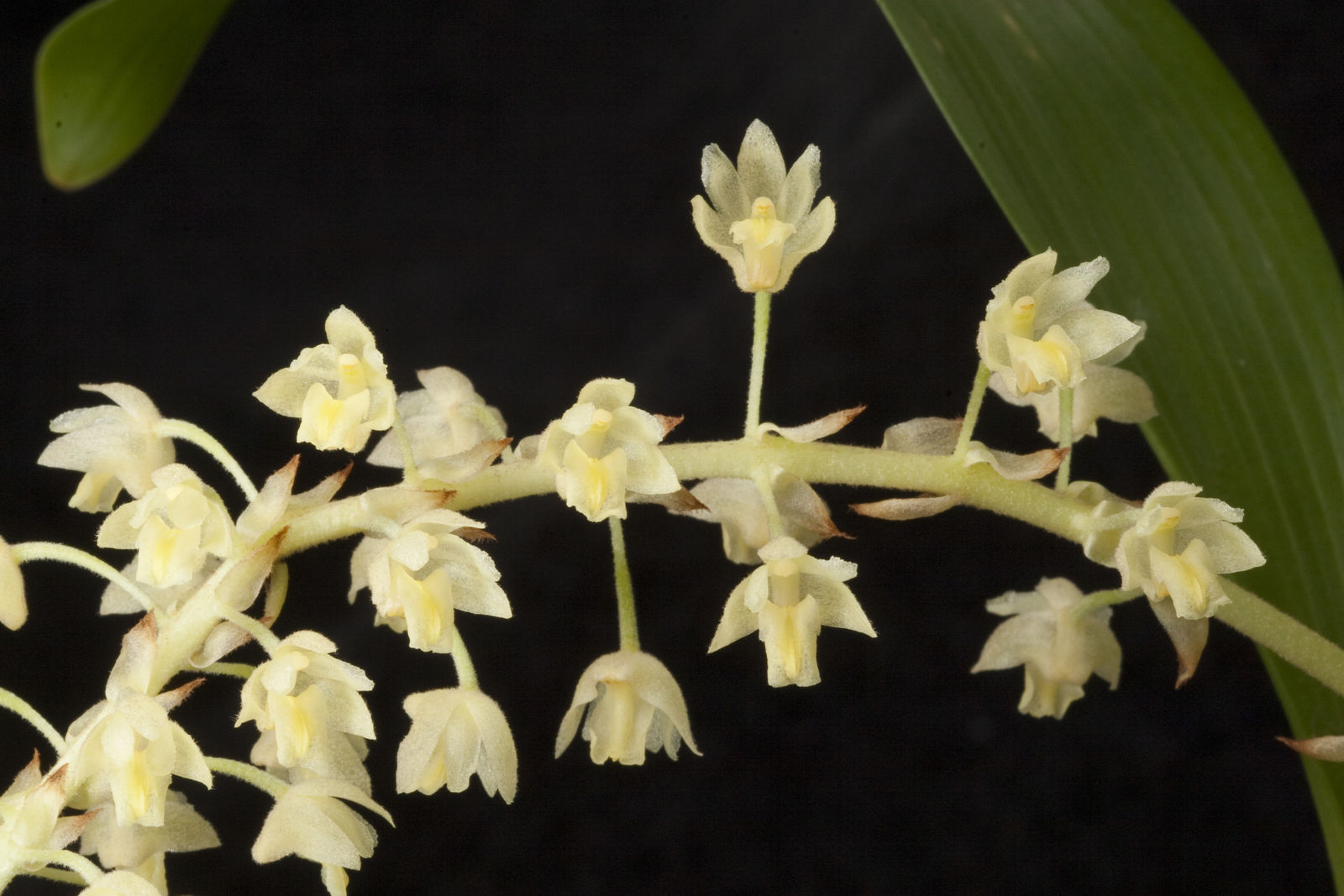
- Cultivated in Kew Gardens

Scientific classification
- Kingdom: Plantae
- Clade: Tracheophytes
- Clade: Angiosperms
- Clade: Monocots
- Order: Asparagales
- Family: Orchidaceae
- Subfamily: Epidendroideae
- Genus: Pinalia
- Species: P. fitzalanii

Binomial name
- Pinalia fitzalanii (F.Muell.) Kuntze

Synonyms
- Eria fitzalanii F.Muell.; Hymeneria fitzalanii (F.Muell.) M.A.Clem. & D.L.Jones); Bryobium indivisum (Schltr.) J.J.Wood; Eria hollandiae J.J.Sm.; Eria indivisa Schltr.; Eria solomonensis Rolfe

= Pinalia fitzalanii =

Species of orchid

Pinalia fitzalanii, commonly known as the common fuzz orchid, is a plant in the orchid family and is a clump-forming epiphyte or lithophyte. It has crowded pseudobulbs, each with three or four stiff, egg-shaped leaves sheathing the pseudobulb and up to thirty five creamy yellow flowers with soft hairs on the outside. It is found in moist habitats in New Guinea, the Solomon Islands and tropical North Queensland.

== Description ==
Pinalia fitzalanii is an epiphytic or lithophytic, clump-forming herb with crowded, oval pseudobulbs 150–200 mm (5.9–7.9 in), 30–40 mm (1.2–1.6 in) wide and covered with papery brown bracts. Each pseudobulb has three or four thin, stiff, egg-shaped leaves 200–300 mm (7.9–12 in) and 40–50 mm (1.6–2.0 in) wide. Between five and thirty five resupinate, creamy yellow flowers, 12–15 mm (0.47–0.59 in) long and wide are borne on a flowering stem 150–300 mm (5.9–12 in) long. The flowers have soft hairs on the outside, and open widely at first, before becoming cup-shaped. The lateral sepals are 6–8 mm (0.24–0.31 in) long and about 4 mm (0.16 in) wide, the dorsal sepal slightly narrower. The petals are 5–7 mm (0.20–0.28 in) long and about 2.5 mm (0.098 in) wide. The labellum is 6–8 mm (0.24–0.31 in) long and 4–5 mm (0.16–0.20 in) wide with a more or less square-cut tip and three ridges along its midline. Flowering occurs between August and October.

== Taxonomy and naming ==
The common fuzz orchid was first formally described in 1882 by Ferdinand von Mueller who gave it the name Eria fitzalanii and published the description in Southern Science Record. The type specimen was collected near the Mulgrave River by Eugene Fitzalan. In 1891, Otto Kuntze changed the name to Pinalia fitzalanii. The specific epithet (fitzalanii) honours the collector of the type specimen.

== Distribution and habitat ==
Pinalia fitzalanii grows on rocks and on trees in humid places in forest and woodland. It is found in the Solomon Islands, in New Guinea and on the Cape York Peninsula in Queensland as far south as Townsville.
