= WWII RAN Fuel Installation, Edge Hill =

WWII RAN Fuel Installation
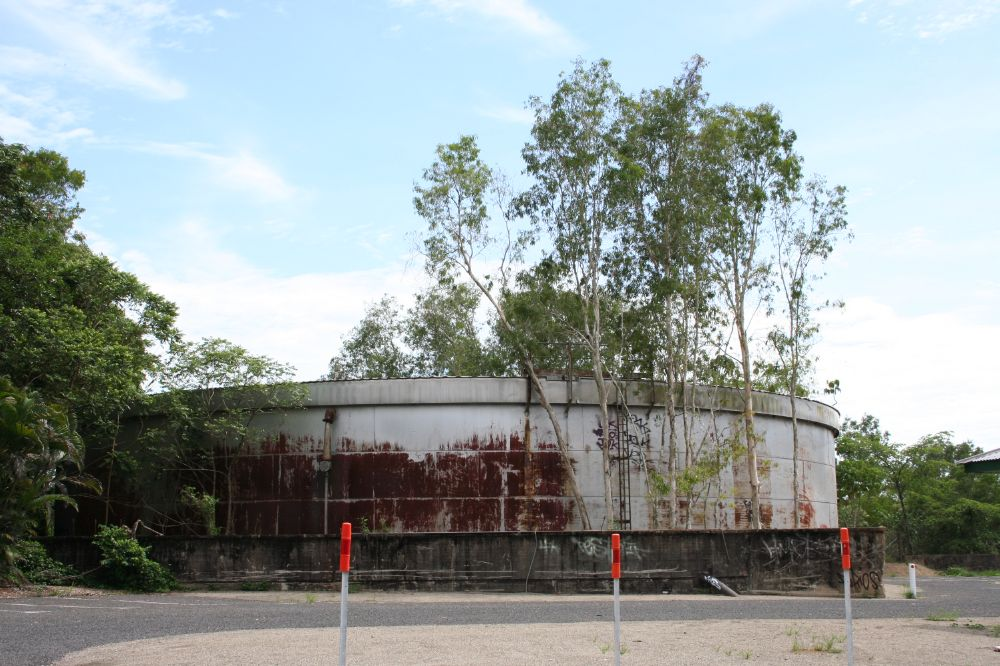
- WWII RAN Fuel Installation, Edge Hill, 2008

- Location within Queensland Location within Australia
- 16.8988°S 145.7519°E
- Location: Collins Avenue, Edge Hill, Cairns, Cairns Region, Queensland, Australia

History
- Design period: 1939–1945 (World War II)
- Built: 1943

Queensland Heritage Register
- Official name: WWII RAN Fuel Installation
- Type: state heritage (built, landscape)
- Designated: 2 February 2007
- Reference no.: 602605
- Significant period: 1880s, 1940s (fabric, historical)
- Significant components: tank – storage, trees/plantings, embankment – railway, garage, bund/s, pump house

WWII RAN Fuel Installation is a heritage-listed former fuel depot and now arts centre at Collins Avenue, Edge Hill, Cairns, Cairns Region, Queensland, Australia. It was built in 1943. It was added to the Queensland Heritage Register on 2 February 2007.

The building is now home to the Tanks Arts Centre, a multi-use, contemporary arts facility for the visual and performing arts.

== History ==
The former Royal Australian Navy (RAN) Fuel Installation at Edge Hill, about five kilometres north of the Cairns city centre, was constructed in 1943 in response to the increased military presence associated with the Pacific war effort during World War II. The installation comprised five large fuel storage tanks, earth and concrete bunds around the tanks, auxiliary buildings and an underground pipeline from the tanks to Cairns wharves. Most of these structures have been incorporated into the Flecker Botanical Gardens, a recreational precinct at the southern foothills of the Mount Whitfield range. Tanks 3–5 have been adaptively re-used as the Tanks Arts Centre, a performance and display space.

Cairns was established in late 1876 as a port to service the Hodgkinson goldfield. In the mid-1880s the Cairns to Herberton railway line was surveyed through the Mt Whitfield range and in 1885 the low swamp lands south of Mt Islay were surveyed into large suburban sections. In December 1886 four of these were gazetted as a temporary recreation reserve of over 71 acres (about 29 hectares). This was extended in 1887 to comprise an area of over 97 acres (about 40 hectares), and by 1892 contained 108.5 acres (approximately 44 hectares). The recreation reserve was gazetted permanently in 1921, as 109.5 acres (just over 44 hectares).

In 1886 an area of 31.5 acres (about 12.75 hectares) on Mt Islay, just north of the recreation reserve and adjacent to the railway, was gazetted as a quarry reserve for the Cairns Municipal Council. This was used for only a few years, the rock being considered too shaly and soft for road fill. In 1908 the gazettal was rescinded.

Cairns' position as the principal access port to the hinterland mining districts was consolidated following completion in 1891 of the Cairns to Kuranda section of the Cairns to Herberton railway. A stopping place, railway siding (for municipal quarry purposes) and shelter shed were constructed a Mt Islay at the three-mile in 1888–89, and was named Edge Hill. In 1911 the line was moved 300 metres (980 ft) east to the other side of Saltwater Creek where a new Edge Hill railway station was erected. The former Edge Hill Railway Station stood where RAN fuel tanks 1 and 2 were constructed in 1943. For some years the Cairns Town Council continued to transport quarry material from Edge Hill to Cairns via its own tramway, using the former railway alignment, but this was abandoned by 1923.

In 1940 about 10 acres (4 hectares) at Mt Islay, above the recreation reserve, again was gazetted as a municipal quarry, this time for land reclamation purposes. The base of Mt Islay lay within the recreation reserve and from 1940 the slope adjoining the gazetted quarry was excavated as part of the quarry workings.

During World War Two Cairns became an important military base in the Pacific region. From September 1942, military personnel began to arrive for deployment. Providing the infrastructure to support the allied war effort at Cairns became a priority, and the decision to build Royal Australian Navy fuel storage tanks in Cairns was given under the highest level of National Security.

Early planning positioned the fuel installation behind wharf no.8 at the dockyards on Trinity Inlet, but as both the Australian and United States navies intended to expand warehouse storage facilities in this area, an alternative site was sought. Two Australian Navy staff visited Cairns in late 1942 and approved a site at Edge Hill that could be camouflaged from the air and would be difficult for an aerial enemy force to attack. It was also sufficiently distant from the wharf precinct to be of little danger to the port if there was enemy action.

The site chosen was on the southern slopes of the Mt Whitfield Range (Mt Islay), adjacent to the recreation reserve. Part of the site was located within a quarry reserve (R.903), part within the recreation reserve (R.267 - now known as Flecker Botanical Gardens) and part on a disused railway reserve. Three large concrete and two large steel fuel tanks were built and commissioned for use by the Royal Australian Navy and the United States Navy in 1943. Up to eight tanks were planned but only five were constructed.

The Allied Works Council, established in February 1942 to co-ordinate civilian construction of Allied military defence facilities in Australia, undertook site preparation and construction of the tanks, auxiliary buildings, bunds and underground pipeline.

The first two tanks were built on the former railway reserve on the north side of Collins Avenue. This land had been leased privately prior to the war and two small buildings were demolished to make way for Tank 2, which lay on the former railway alignment. Tank 1 was constructed on the site of the former Edge Hill railway station. Because these tanks were intended to hold dieseline they were constructed in plate steel, sourced from Broken Hill Pty Ltd. There were significant delays during construction, with correspondence between Queensland Main Roads, Allied Works Council and the Australian Navy revealing the frustration of all concerned in a project that was considered vital to the Allied war effort. Confusion as to where the steel tanks were to be sited, a lack of graders and poor planning hindered construction. Adjacent to tanks 1 and 2 a small pump house was constructed and an underground fuel pipeline was laid from the pump house along the former Cairns-Herberton railway embankment and under the streets of North Cairns to Trinity Wharf.

South of Collins Avenue, opposite Tanks 1 and 2 and on the former railway alignment, a fire station (garage) and foam tank were constructed.

Tanks 3–5 were sited further west, on the former quarry located partly within the recreation reserve and partly within a quarry reserve. This area was already part excavated. Further excavation, including removal of a rocky outcrop, was undertaken during the second half of 1943 to create a level site for tanks 3–5.

Tanks 3–5 were sited away from the first two tanks for several reasons. Firstly the landscape was prohibitive and part of the hill had to be removed, with the core left for camouflage, before all five tanks could be constructed. Secondly, having tanks 3–5 located at some distance from tanks 1–2 decreased risk to the whole installation. Thirdly, existing mature trees and the topography could be capitalised on to camouflage tanks 3–5 (tanks 1 and 2 relied on heavy steel cables and netting material as camouflage).

Because tanks 3–5 were intended for the storage of crude oil they were constructed in reinforced concrete. This was hand-poured by a team of contractors from Melbourne, with some workers inscribing their names in the concrete bunds surrounding the tanks. A second pump house was constructed adjacent to tanks 3–5, and an underground fuel pipeline was laid from this pump house south east across the adjacent recreation reserve to join the pipeline from tanks 1 and 2 along the disused railway embankment. The former fuel pipeline still runs under north Cairns.

In March 1944 the Commonwealth government requisitioned part of the quarry reserve above tanks 3–5 to establish an observation and communications post for the protection of the fuel storage tanks below.

After the war the Commonwealth removed the structures associated with the observation post on Mt Islay, but decided to retain the fuel storage tanks for their intended purpose. In the late 1940s and early 1950s the Commonwealth formalised its occupation of the land, gaining title to Lot 346 (tanks 1–2), Lot 348 (fire station and foam tank) and Lot 349 (tanks 3–5) and taking up an easement over the pipeline (Lot 95A) as far south as Little Street. The tanks continued to be used for fuel storage by the Australian Navy and private fuel companies. Tank 1 was leased to Caltex from 1957 and the Australian Meat and Grazing Company leased tank 2 from November 1958, to store molasses.

In 1964 work was undertaken on Tank 2 to repair damage from the molasses and Tank 1 was reconstructed. A new roof, supported on four extra steel poles, was constructed over the original, which is still visible from inside the tank. The original timber pole supports also survive in situ.

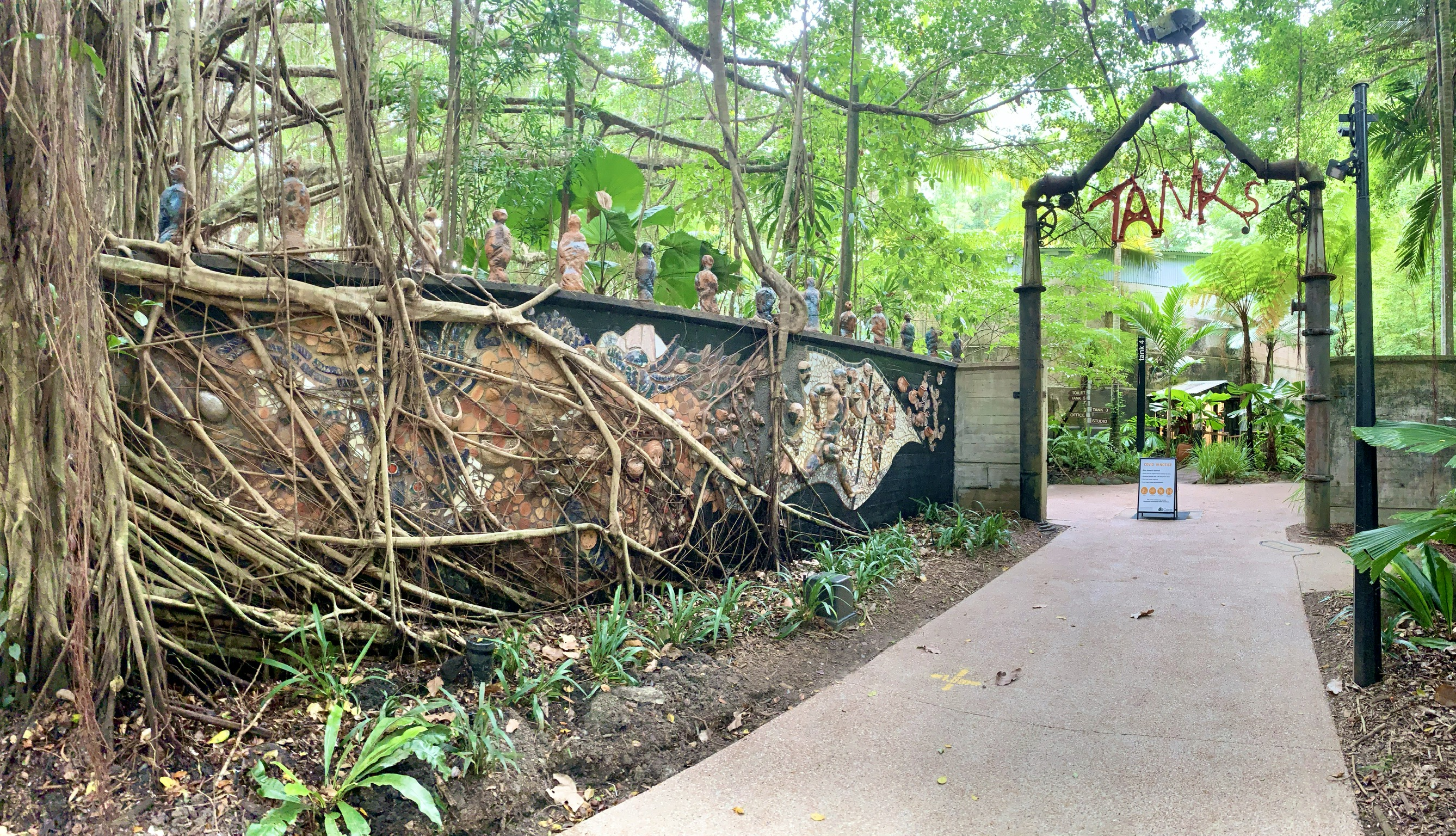
Tanks Art Centre, Cairns

Tank 4 became inoperable in 1976 when it began leaking crude oil. Caltex continued use of at least one of the tanks until 1983 and the Australian Navy used the remainder until 1987.

In 1991 Cairns City Council purchased all 5 tanks, but not the pipeline, from the Australian Government, and the land was transferred to the council. In 1995 tanks 3–5 were refurbished as the Tanks Arts Centre, hosting art exhibitions, performing artists, children's workshops and markets. The Tanks Arts Centre is a unit of the Cairns Regional Council and is situated adjacent to the Cairns Botanic Gardens. The centre's facilities include a contemporary art gallery, music space and a theatre space. Programs include concerts, theatre programs, art exhibitions, adult and children's workshops, films and comedy events.

== Description ==
The former WWII RAN Fuel Installation at Edge Hill is located 5 kilometres (3.1 mi) north of the original port of Cairns, in the foothills of the Mt Whitfield Range. The installation, built into the side of Mt Islay, comprises five large fuel tanks (three in concrete, two in steel), earth and concrete bunds, two pump houses, a fire station (garage), foam tank and part of a disused railway embankment, located within three non-contiguous land parcels. Associated with the installation is a fuel pipeline owned by the Australian Government, which cannot be included in the Queensland Heritage Register entry for the former WWII RAN Fuel Installation.

=== Site 1: Tanks 1 and 2 (Lot 346 on RP711610) ===
Land parcel 346/RP711610 is located on the north side of Collins Avenue near the eastern entrance to the Flecker Botanical Gardens, on a former railway reserve. It contains tanks 1 and 2, a pump house, an earth bund and a concrete bund.

Tanks 1 and 2 are welded steel circular structures set on concrete foundations. Tank 1 has external steel stairs and pipe fixtures have been removed. Floor panels, roof cladding and steel roof framing have been replaced. Air vents and a doorway have been cut into the side of the tank.

Tank 2 is the northernmost tank and remains relatively intact. The outlet service pipes and internal timber uprights and ceiling are intact. The primary modification is the replacement of the roofing with "Spandex" cladding and the addition of a galvanised or Zincalume "collar" immediately blow the roofline.

There is a bund of formwork concrete, approximately 1.5 metres (4 ft 11 in) in height, around Tank 1. This is topped with three strands of barbed wire strung between angled metal posts. Tank 2, which is situated on higher land than tank I, has an earth bund faced around the base with dry-stone rubble, roughly coursed. To the west/south west of the tanks a pump house is situated close to the Collins Avenue road alignment, outside the bunds. This is a small, single-storeyed, in rendered masonry building with a gambrel roof clad in corrugated iron and steel sheeting (possibly replacing corrugated fibrous cement sheeting). The structure rests on a concrete slab. In the front wall there are windows and a pair of large double doors opening to Collins Avenue.

=== Site 2: Support structures (Lot 1 on RP17796) ===
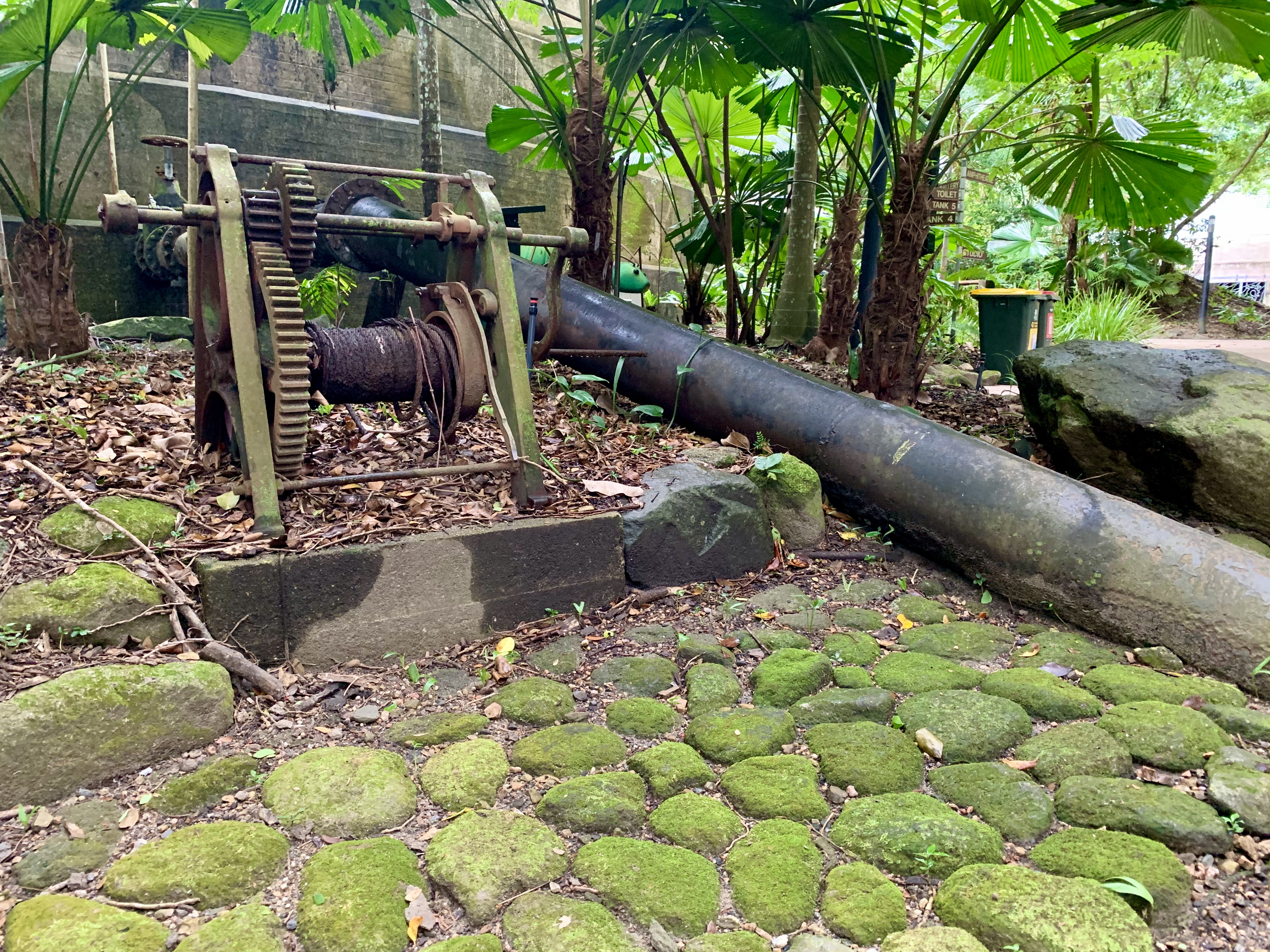
Fuel Installation pipe connected to one of the tank

Land parcel 1/RP17796 is located on the south side of Collins Avenue, opposite Tanks 1 and 2, on part of the original Cairns-Herberton Railway alignment. It contains two small former support structures associated with the WWII RAN Fuel Installation: a fire station (garage) and foam tank.

The former fire station is located on the western side of this allotment close to the Collins Avenue road alignment. It is a small, singled-storeyed, gable-roofed garage clad with fibrous-cement sheeting on the walls and corrugated fibrous-cement sheeting on the roof. It has a skillion-roofed side extension, the walls of which are clad in corrugated steel and the roof in corrugated galvanised iron. The whole rests on a concrete slab. The front elevation principally comprises three sets of double garage doors -one in the gabled section and two in the skillion side extension - opening onto Collins Avenue. The former fire station was demolished in late 2006 to make way for the realignment of Collins Avenue.

Also on this land parcel, but separated from the fire station by the former railway embankment, is the former foam tank. The tank is rectangular is shape, of pressed metal with a flat galvanised iron roof supported on timber framing. The whole rests on a brick base that in turn sits on a concrete slab. At the rear the slab extends beyond the current structure, where there are the brick base remnants of other partitions. A metal pipe is connected to the top of one of the walls of the tank and extends into the ground. It has a tap and stop- cock mid-way along its length.

=== Site 3: Tanks 3, 4 and 5 (Lot 349 on RP715416 and Lot 402 on SP201236) ===
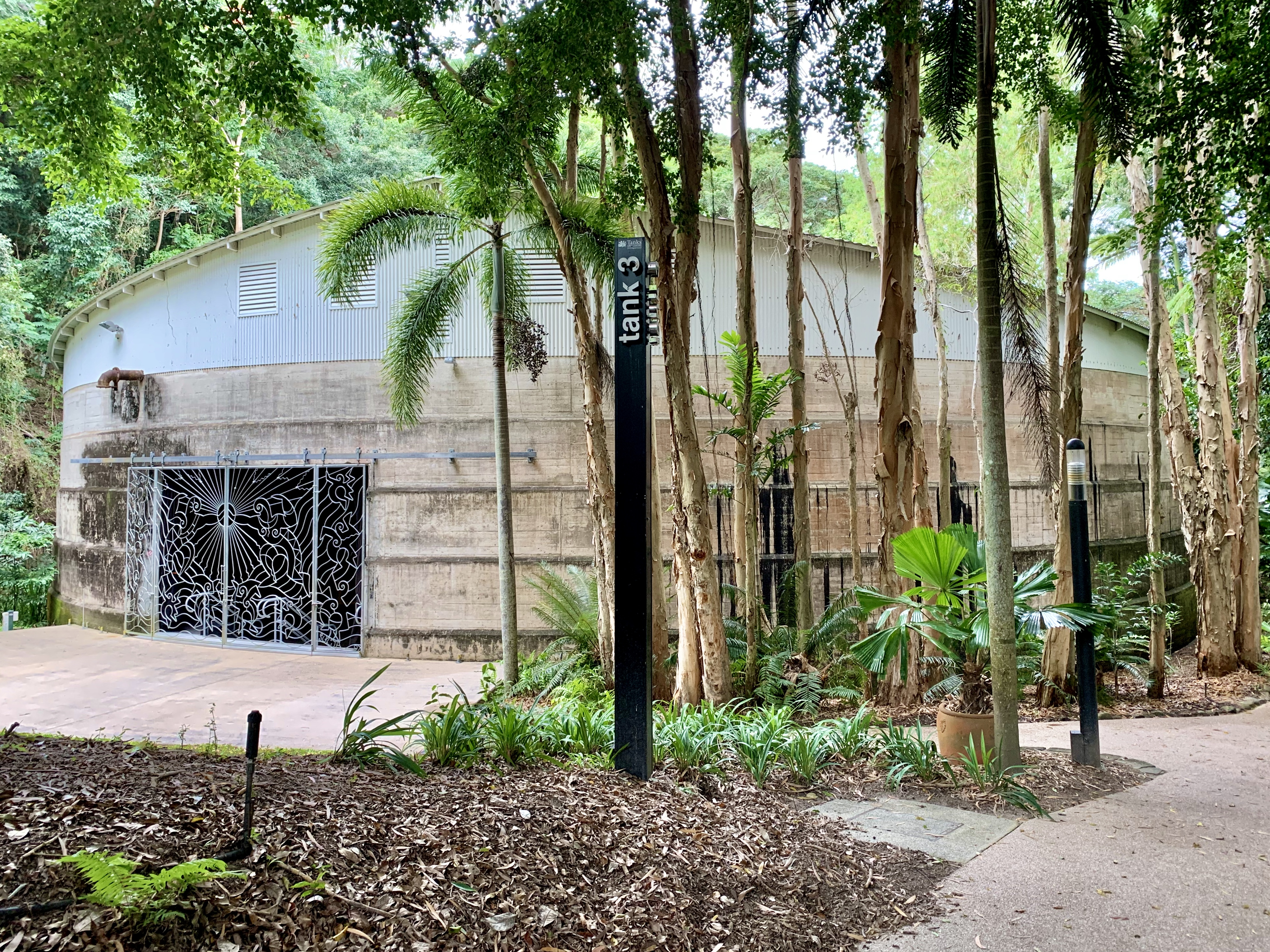
Tank 3, Tanks Art Centre

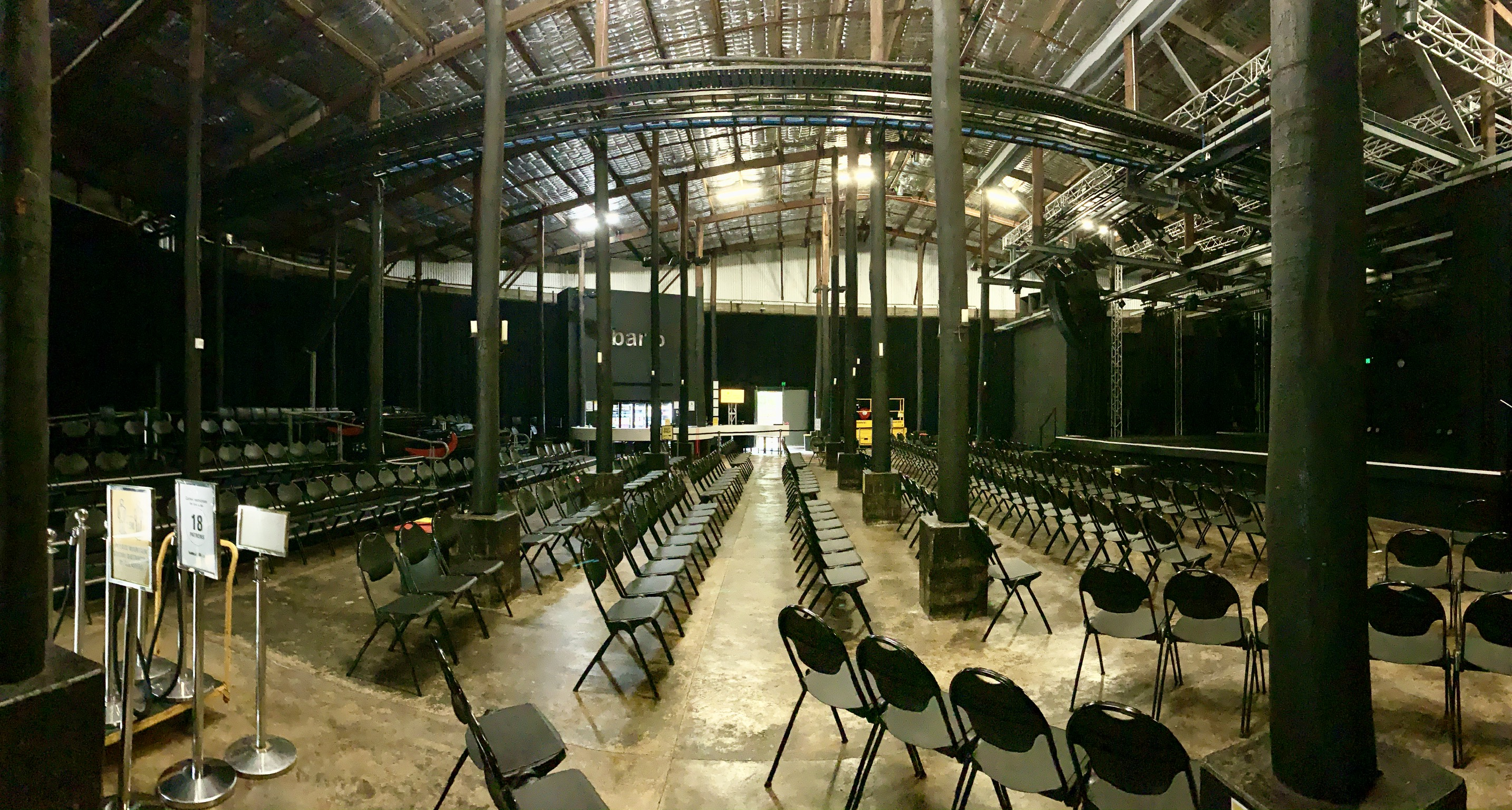
Performing arts venue inside the tank

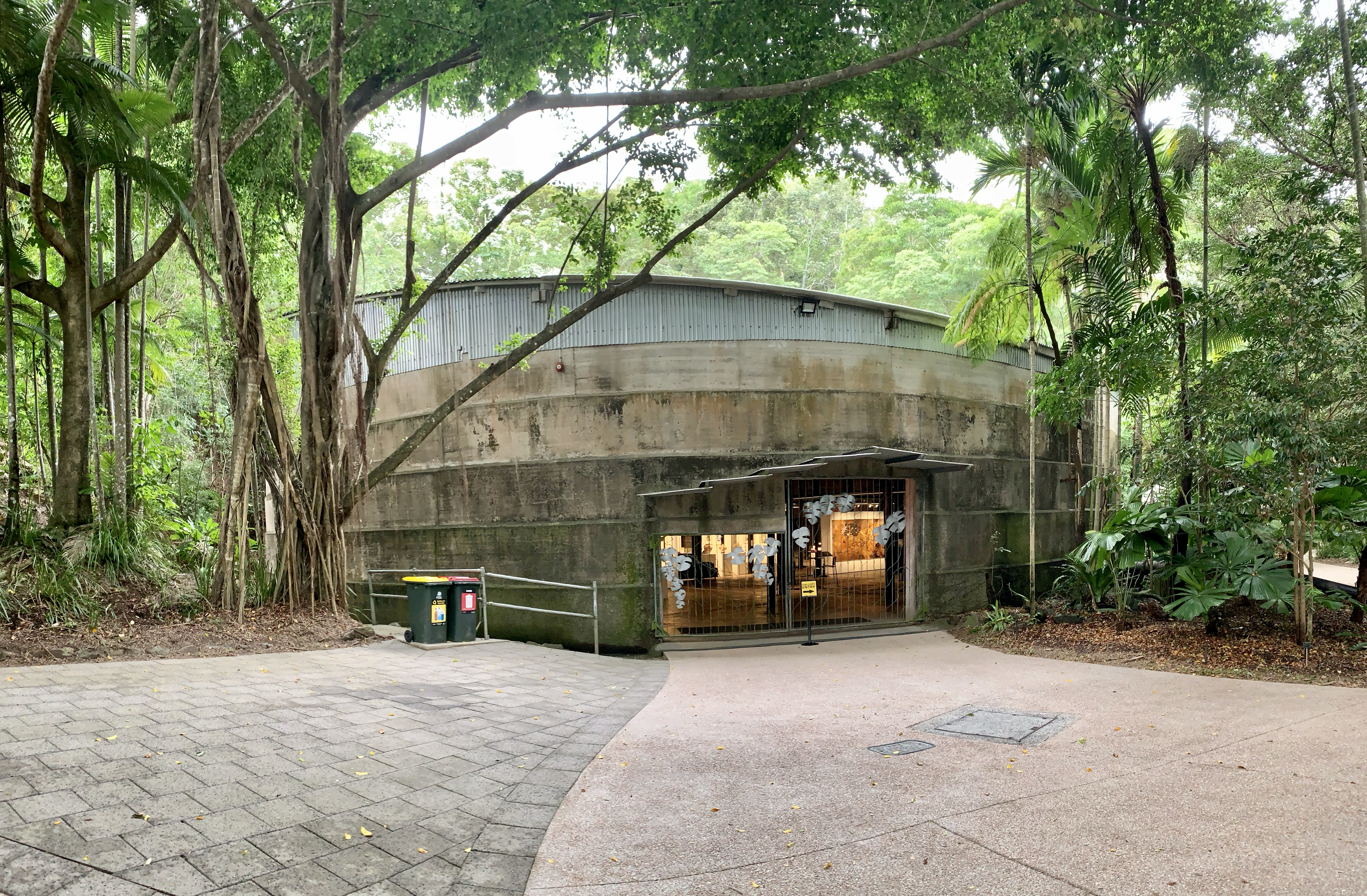
Tank 4 gallery entrance

Land parcel 349/RP715416 is located on the north side of Collins Avenue approximately 500 metres (1,600 ft) west of tanks 1 and 2, on a former quarry site. It contains tanks 3, 4 and 5, a concrete bund, a former foam shed and a former pump house. This site has been redeveloped as the Tanks Art Centre. Tanks 3, 4 and 5 are reinforced concrete structures on concrete slabs. Tank 3 is easternmost and is used for performing arts. Large holes have been cut into the walls of the tank, one for access and one opening onto an outside stage facing a grassed amphitheatre. Roofing materials and internal fittings have been replaced.

Tank 4 is located in the centre of the site, facing the gated entrance to the Tanks Art Centre. It is used as a gallery and has recent interior wall partitions to facilitate art displays. Doors and ventilation holes have been cut into the walls of the tank. Part of the early Trinity Wharf has been placed inside the tank as a sculptural feature. The fabric consists of heavy timber logs with oyster encrustations and industrial scale links and chain. This sculpture forms a tangible link between Trinity Wharf and the naval fuel storage tanks, reflecting the physical link via the underground pipeline.

Tank 5 is westernmost and has had similar modifications to tanks 3 and 4. It has openings for ventilation and access cut into the walls and has had roofing materials replaced.

A bund of formwork concrete about 1.5 metres (4 ft 11 in) in height extends along Collins Avenue for the length of the Tanks Arts Centre, overgrown with vegetation such as trees and orchids. Large figs (Ficus spp.) and other tropical species contribute to the landscape within the Tanks Art Centre.

Just outside the bund, close to the Collins Avenue road alignment and just to the east of the entrance to the Tanks Arts Centre, is a former pump house of similar construction to the pump house associated with tanks 1 and 2. It is a small, single-storeyed building in rendered masonry, with a gambrel roof clad in corrugated fibrous-cement sheeting. It functions as the administration building for the arts centre.

A second foam shed is located in the south western corner of Lot 349 just outside the bund wall and facing Collins Avenue. Sharing the same dimensions as the foam shed on Lot 1 RP17796, and resting on a brick base sitting on a concrete slab, this shed has been modified over time. Double doors have been created in the western wall to allow the shed to be used for storage purposes.

== Heritage listing ==
WWII RAN Fuel Installation was listed on the Queensland Heritage Register on 2 February 2007 having satisfied the following criteria.

The place is important in demonstrating the evolution or pattern of Queensland's history.

The former WWII RAN Fuel Installation is important in demonstrating the impact of WWII on far north Queensland. Its construction was given the highest priority under National Security regulations. Its strategic location in the foothills of the Mt Whitfield Range, 5 kilometres (3.1 mi) from the port and with dense surrounding vegetation, demonstrates the importance of selecting a secure location for the storage of naval fuel supplies during times of war.

The place demonstrates rare, uncommon or endangered aspects of Queensland's cultural heritage.

The installation is a rare surviving purpose-built WWII Naval fuel storage facility associated with the Pacific war and located in an urban setting.

The place is important in demonstrating the principal characteristics of a particular class of cultural places.

The installation, which comprises five large fuel tanks, two pump houses, concrete and earth bunds and ancillary structures (including a fire station and foam tank), is important in demonstrating the principal characteristics of its type. The complex reveals information about construction techniques, materials, form, design and location of structures specifically designed for storage of naval fuel in 1943. Because of its relative intactness, Tank 2 is particularly noted for this criterion.

The place is important because of its aesthetic significance.

The tanks in particular demonstrate elements of form, scale and material that contribute to the aesthetic significance of the site. Tanks 1 and 2 contain aesthetic value as industrial ruins in an urban environment; the scale, circular form and rusting exteriors form the main aesthetic elements. Tanks 3, 4 and 5 contain high aesthetic values as industrial ruins in a heavily vegetated urban environment. Vegetation such as Ficus spp. and orchids contribute to the aesthetic values of the place.

The place has a special association with the life or work of a particular person, group or organisation of importance in Queensland's history.

The installation has a special association with the work of the Allied Works Council, which made a substantial contribution to the construction of defence facilities in Queensland, particularly in northern Queensland and often in difficult terrain, during WWII.
