= Psychotria fitzalanii =

Conservation status
- Least Concern (NCA)

Scientific classification
- Kingdom: Plantae
- Clade: Tracheophytes
- Clade: Angiosperms
- Clade: Eudicots
- Clade: Asterids
- Order: Gentianales
- Family: Rubiaceae
- Genus: Psychotria
- Species: P. fitzalanii

Binomial name
- Psychotria fitzalanii Benth.

Species of flowering plant

Psychotria fitzalanii is a species of shrub or small tree in the coffee family Rubiaceae that is endemic to Queensland in Australia.

== Habitat & distribution ==
The species can be found along the eastern seaboard in rainforest and wet schlerophyll forests in North Queensland up to the tip of the Cape York Peninsula, with most records confirming the presence of the species in four distinct clusters in or near the settlements of Airlie Beach, Townsville, Cairns and Cooktown.

== Description ==
It can grow as a shrub or tree to a height of 6 metres. The species has a perennial life cycle and is hermaphroditic. The species flowers from February to November and fruits from May to August. The species features fleshy, indehiscent and drupaceous fruit. The species is evergreen. The length of the leaves is 105 millimetres and the width of the leaves is 40 millimetres.

== Conservation ==
Under the Nature Conservation Act 1992 in Queensland it has been classified as Least Concern.
