= Musa fitzalanii =

Conservation status
- Extinct (1875) (IUCN 3.1)

Scientific classification
- Kingdom: Plantae
- Clade: Embryophytes
- Clade: Tracheophytes
- Clade: Spermatophytes
- Clade: Angiosperms
- Clade: Monocots
- Clade: Commelinids
- Order: Zingiberales
- Family: Musaceae
- Genus: Musa
- Section: Musa sect. Callimusa
- Species: †M. fitzalanii

Binomial name
- †Musa fitzalanii F.Muell.

Species of flowering plant

Musa fitzalanii was a species of wild banana (genus Musa), which was native to north-east Queensland, Australia, but is now believed to be extinct. The type specimen was collected in the 19th century, from the vicinity of 'Daintree's River' most likely by Eugene Fitzalan, an Irish collector who apparently worked with Ferdinand von Mueller, the first describer of the species. Along with M. acuminata and M. jackeyi, it was one of the three species native to Australia. It was placed in section Callimusa (now including the former section Australimusa).
