= Edmonton, Queensland =

Edmonton
- Town
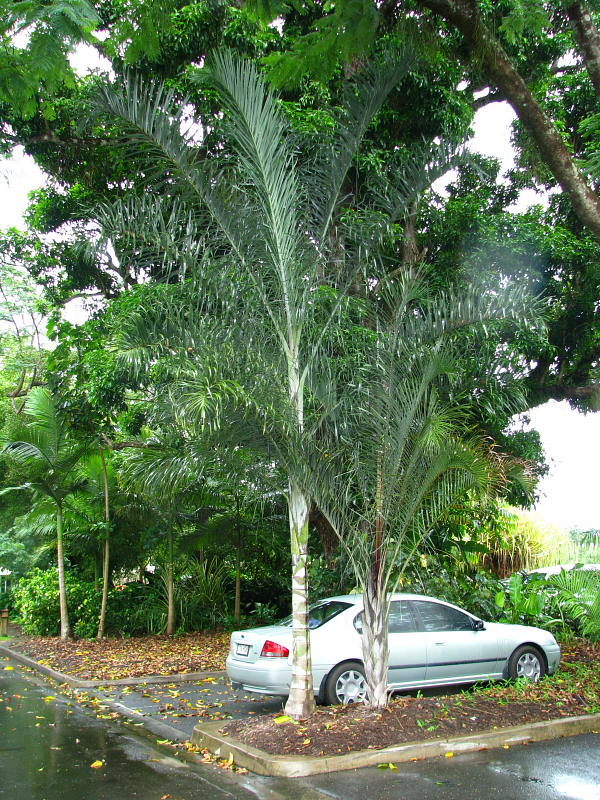
- Triangle palms at SugarWorld, Edmonton, 2008

- Interactive map of Edmonton
- Coordinates: 17.0188°S 145.7444°E
- Country: Australia
- State: Queensland
- City: Cairns
- LGA: Cairns Region
- Location: 13.7 km (8.5 mi) SSW of Cairns CBD; 335 km (208 mi) NNW of Townsville; 1,666 km (1,035 mi) NNW of Brisbane

Government
  - State electorate: Mulgrave
  - Federal division: Kennedy

Area
  - Total: 20.5 km^{2} (7.9 sq mi)
- Elevation: 16.8 m (55 ft)

Population
  - Total: 11,409 (2021 census)
  - Density: 556.5/km^{2} (1,441/sq mi)
- Time zone: UTC+10:00 (AEST)
- Postcode: 4869
Localities around Edmonton
Bentley Park	White Rock	Portsmith
Lamb Range	Edmonton	Wrights Creek
Lamb Range	Mount Peter	Wrights Creek

Edmonton is a town and suburb in the Cairns Region, Queensland, Australia. In the 2021 census, the suburb of Edmonton had a population of 11,409 people.

== Geography ==
Edmonton is located 13.1 kilometres (8.1 mi) by road south-southwest of the Cairns CBD. It is within the Cairns Region local government area.

The Bruce Highway passes from the south (Mount Peter / Wrights Creek) to the north (Mount Sheridan / White Rock) through the centre of the suburb and the North Coast railway line passes from south to north through Edmonton parallel and to the east of the highway. The suburb is served by Edmonton railway station (17.0197°S 145.7450°E) and Queerah railway station (17.0047°S 145.7447°E). A cane tramway network delivers harvested sugarcane to the Mulgrave Sugar Mill at Gordonvale.

The average elevation of Edmonton, Cairns is 16.8 metres (55.1 feet) above sea level.

== History ==
Edmonton is situated in the Yidinji traditional Aboriginal country.

Originally known as Hambledon, then Hambledon Junction, Edmonton began as a group of sugarcane plantations selected in 1883 by Thomas Swallow.

Blackfellow's Creek Provisional School opened in 1887 with 23 students, becoming Blackfellow's Creek State School in 1903. In 1910, it was relocated to its current site and renamed Hambledon State School.

There was a railway station known as Hambledon Junction from 1897, but in 1911 the Queensland Railways Department took over the Cairns-Mulgrave Tramway from the Cairns Divisional Board and renamed it Edmonton, probably after Edmonton, London, England. The town then took this name.

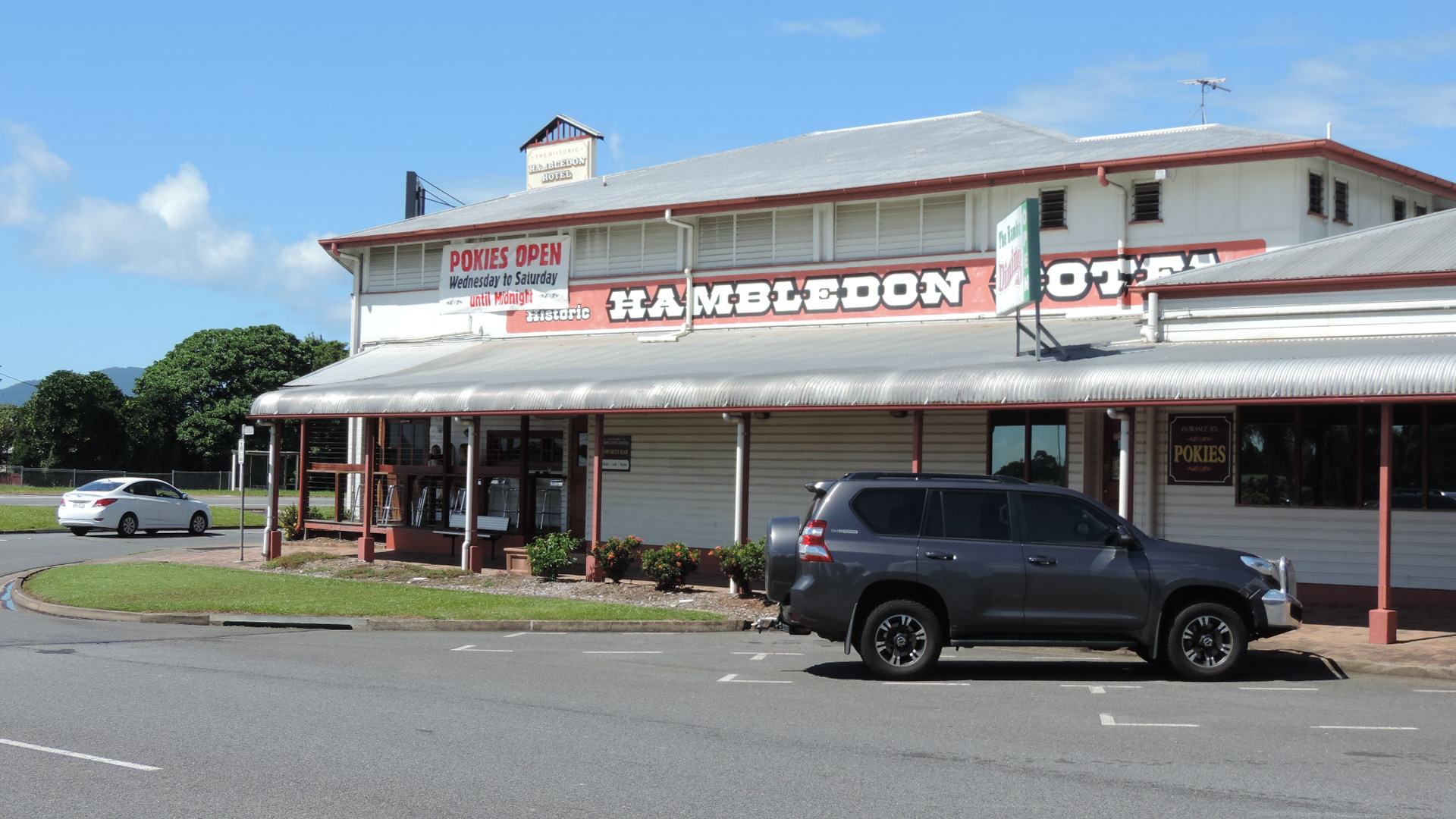
The Historic Hambledon Hotel, 2018

The Hambledon Hotel was built in 1907. It burned down in 1918 but was rebuilt in 1919. It is now known as the Historic Hambledon Hotel.

On 20 April 1916, the Cane Beetles March commenced at Mooliba (now Mirriwinni). It was a snowball march to recruit men into the Australian Imperial Force during World War I at a time when enthusiasm to enlist had waned after the loss of life in the Gallipoli campaign. The march began at Mooliba with 4 men, passing through Babinda, Aloomba, Gordonvale, and Edmonton, and ending in Cairns 60 kilometres later with 29 recruits.

After some years of fund raising, in September 1924, the Anglican community in Edmonton called for tenders to erect a church building. A stump-capping ceremony was held on Saturday 8 November 1924. The new church was opened and dedicated on Christmas Day, 25 December 1924. In 2000, the Anglican Church sold the church building. It was at 32 Queen Street (17.0213°S 145.7466°E). It has been converted into a private residence.

Queerah railway station was originally called Wahwon, an Aboriginal name meaning scrub turkey and on 8 September 1925 was renamed Queerah, an Aboriginal word, meaning a cyclone.

The Edmonton Catholic School was established on 29 April 1929 by the Sisters of Mercy with an initial enrolment of 30 pupils. In 1965 it was renamed St Therese's School. As suburban development increased around Edmonton, the rising number of students made it necessary to relocate the school to neighbouring Bentley Park in 1995. Although now under lay leadership, St Therese's School continues to operate in the Mercy tradition.

The Edmonton parish of the Roman Catholic Diocese of Cairns was established in 1965. Its only church, St Theresa's, is at 135 Robert Street in neighbouring Bentley Park.

The Edmonton public library building opened in 1975.

The primary industry in Edmonton was traditionally growing sugarcane, but as Edmonton has grown, it has become an outer suburb of Cairns. Edmonton has experienced rapid growth in new housing estates in recent years resulting in consequent population growth.

On 20 October 1983, the first Sikh temple in Queensland, the Guru Nanak Gurudwara, was opened at 289 Djarragun Way (just off the Bruce Highway) but is now within the present-day boundaries of neighbouring Mount Peter.

Edmonton Uniting Church opened in 1998.

In March 2006, Tropical Cyclone Larry hit Edmonton causing minimal damage. The centre of the cyclone passed through the town of Innisfail, 75 kilometres (47 mi) south of the suburb.

Isabella State School opened on 29 January 2007.

The Autism Queensland Education & Therapy Centre opened on 29 January 2019.

In 2023, Blackfellow's Creek was renamed Bana Gindarja Creek. The community was divided over the name change.

== Demographics ==
In the 2016 census, the suburb of Edmonton had a population of 10,753 people.

In the 2021 census, the suburb of Edmonton had a population of 11,409 people.

== Education ==
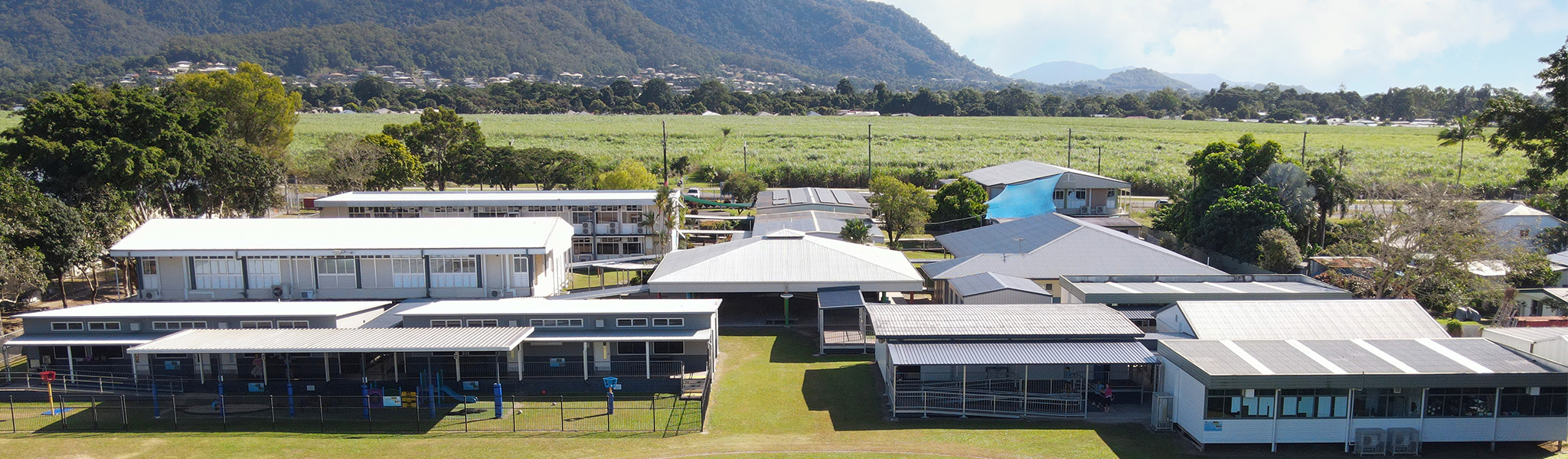
Hambledon State School, 2023

Hambledon State School is a government primary (Prep-6) school for boys and girls at 77-83 Stokes Street (17.0212°S 145.7356°E). In 2016, the school had an enrolment of 774 students with 66 teachers (57 full-time equivalent) and 38 non-teaching staff (24 full-time equivalent). In 2018, the school had an enrolment of 694 students with 63 teachers (52 full-time equivalent) and 44 non-teaching staff (28 full-time equivalent). It includes a special education program.

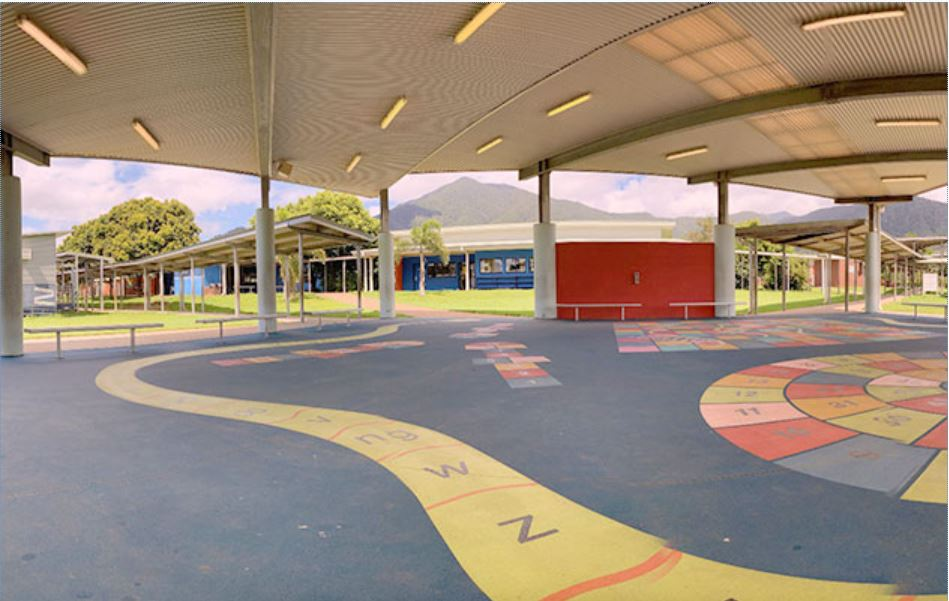
Isabella State School, 2023

Isabella State School is a government primary (Prep-6) school for boys and girls on Walker Road (17.0156°S 145.7231°E). In 2016, the school had an enrolment of 625 students with 45 teachers (40 full-time equivalent) and 37 non-teaching staff (21 full-time equivalent). In 2018, the school had an enrolment of 600 students with 43 teachers (39 full-time equivalent) and 36 non-teaching staff (22 full-time equivalent). It includes a special education program.

The Autism Queensland Education & Therapy Centre is an infants (Prep-2) special education school for boys and girls 15-17 Marr Street (17.0233°S 145.7373°E). It provides 2 days per week of specialist autism programs and the children attend regular schools for the rest of the week.

There are no secondary schools in Edmonton. The nearest government secondary school is Bentley Park College in neighbouring Bentley Park to the north-west.

== Communications ==
As a suburb of Cairns, Edmonton is served by the city's broadcasting media outlets and the Cairns Post newspaper. The Southern Herald is the local independent monthly suburban newspaper which is delivered to homes in Edmonton.

== Amenities ==
The Cairns Regional Council operates the Edmonton Library at 175 Bruce Highway (17.0173°S 145.7438°E).

Edmonton Community Hall is in Pyne Street (in Down Park, 17.01951°S 145.74716°E). It is capable of seating up to 80 people and is operated by the Cairns Regional Council.

Edmonton Uniting Church is at 2-6 Ravizza Close (17.0179°S 145.7429°E). It is part of the Presbytery of North Queensland of the Uniting Church in Australia.

== Attractions ==
Edmonton is home to a mid-sized water park/recreation area named Sugarworld in Hambledon Drive (17.0216°S 145.7259°E). The park is on the site of the former Hambledon sugar mill and includes some relics and century-old trees from the mill.

Cairns International Raceway is at 1308 Fisherman Road (17.0019°S 145.7661°E). It offers a wide range of motorsport competitions.

== See also ==
- List of tramways in Queensland
