= Wrights Creek, Queensland =

Wrights Creek
- Suburb
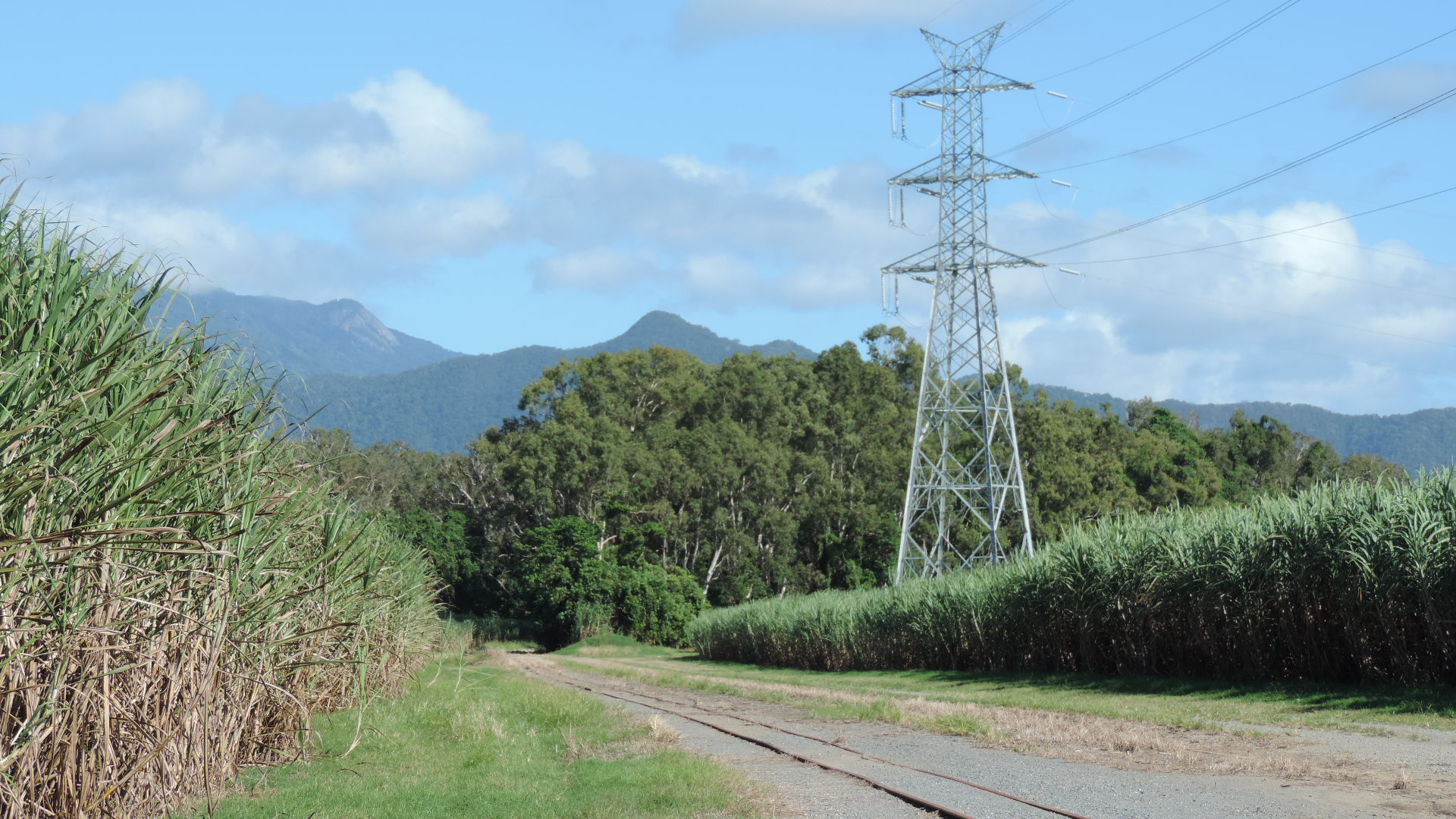
- Looking west along the cane trameway to the Mulgrave Sugar Mill from Hill Road, Wrights Creek, 2018

- Interactive map of Wrights Creek
- Coordinates: 17.0211°S 145.7738°E
- Country: Australia
- State: Queensland
- LGA: Cairns Region
- Location: 5.7 km (3.5 mi) SE of Bentley Park; 7.1 km (4.4 mi) N of Gordonvale; 16.4 km (10.2 mi) S of Cairns CBD; 1,683 km (1,046 mi) NNW of Brisbane

Government
  - State electorate: Mulgrave
  - Federal divisions: Kennedy; Leichhardt

Area
  - Total: 22.7 km^{2} (8.8 sq mi)

Population
  - Total: 160 (2021 census)
  - Density: 7.05/km^{2} (18.3/sq mi)
- Time zone: UTC+10:00 (AEST)
- Postcode: 4869
Suburbs around Wrights Creek
Edmonton	Portsmith	Packers Camp
Edmonton	Wrights Creek	Packers Camp
Mount Peter	Mount Peter	Gordonvale

Wrights Creek is a rural locality in the Cairns Region, Queensland, Australia. The origin of the suburb name is from the Wright brothers who brought cattle to Wrights Creek in the year 1878. In the 2021 census, Wrights Creek had a population of 160 people.

== Geography ==
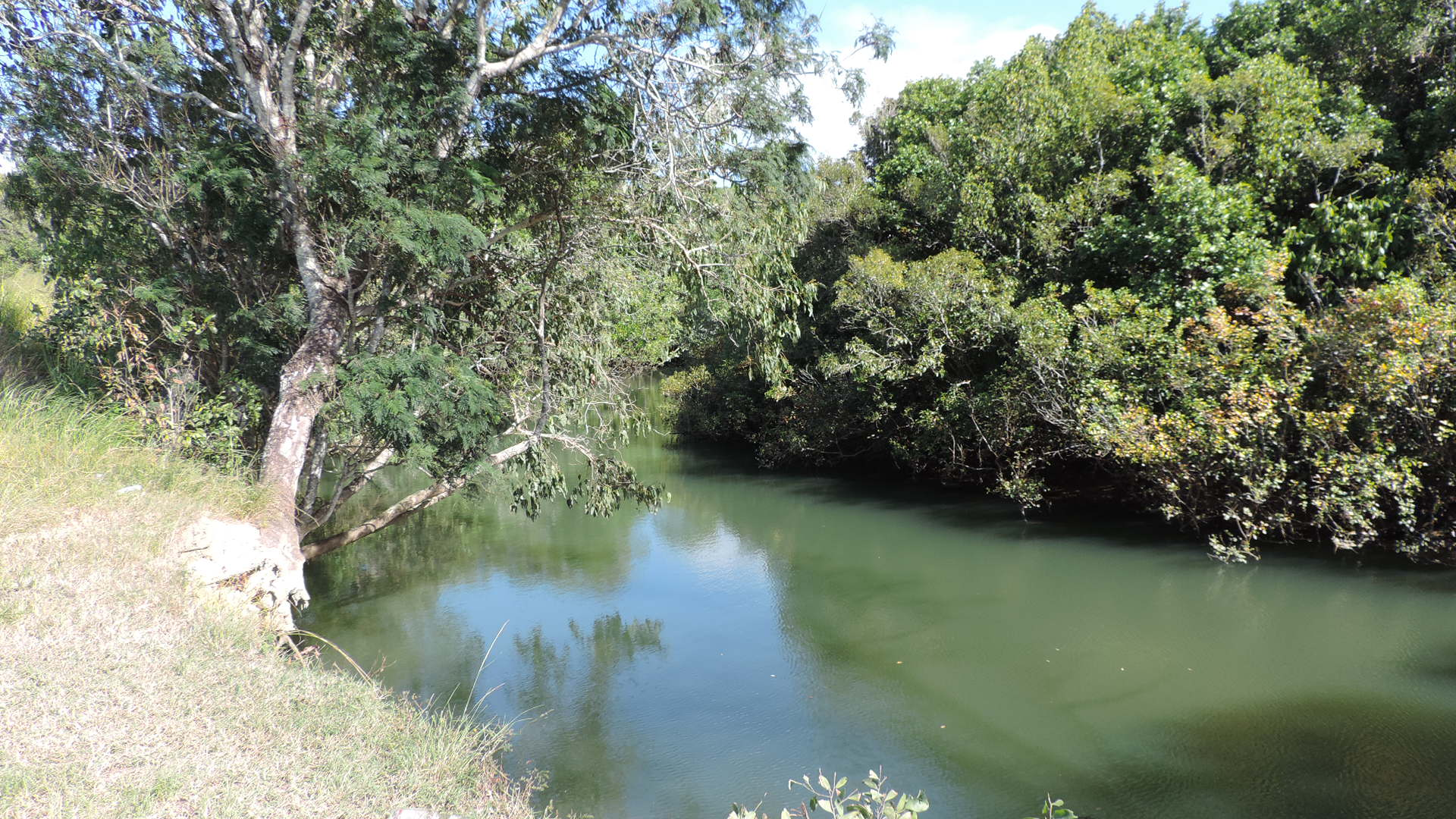
Wrights Creek (the watercourse) at the northern end of Hill Road, 2018

The locality is mostly low-lying flat land (approx 10 metres above sea level) with a small area of mountainous area in the south-west of the locality rising to an unnamed peak of 200 metres above sea level. The Trinity Inlet (aka Smith Creek) is the northern boundary of the locality while Wrights Creek (the watercourse from which the locality takes its name) and Mackey Creek form parts of the eastern and western boundaries of the locality. Warner Road is the southern boundary. The northern part of the locality is undeveloped wetlands and the mountainous region is also undeveloped. However, apart from these undeveloped areas, the land use is farming (predominantly grwowing sugarcane).

The Bruce Highway and North Coast railway line pass through the south-western part of the locality with Kamma railway station (17.05222°S 145.76889°E) on the boundary with neighbouring Gordonvale serving the local area. There is also a network of cane tramways to transport the harvested sugarcane to the Mulgrave Sugar Mill.

== History ==
Wrights Creek is situated in the Yidinji traditional Aboriginal country.

Wright's Creek Provisional School opened on 8 October 1894, becoming Wright's Creek State School on 1 January 1909. It closed in September 1953. It was on the north-eastern side of the railway line south of Harris Road (approx 17.04016°S 45.76575°E).

The locality was formerly serviced by now-abandoned Yatee railway station (17.0397°S 145.7618°E).

== Demographics ==
In the 2016 census, Wrights Creek had a population of 156 people.

In the 2021 census, Wrights Creek had a population of 160 people.

== Education ==
There are no schools in Wrights Creek. The nearest government primary schools are Hambledon State School in neighbouring Edmonton to the west and Gordonvale State School in neighbouring Gordonvale to the south-east. The nearest government secondary schools are Bentley Park College in Bentley Park to the north-west and Gordonvale State High School in Gordonvale.

== Development ==
As part of the Wrights Creek development plan, a trade, enterprise, freight and industry zone has been proposed in the southern part of Wrights Creek nearby Gordonvale to diversify the economy of the Cairns region and to provide employment opportunities. The development plan utilises the location of the Bruce Highway and North Coast railway line transport corridors. Significant portions of land would be retained for the purpose of sugarcane farming in the area and environmental management purposes. The local council supported the state development area on the basis that existing private businesses in the region would not be impacted by competition.

As part of the Bruce Highway Southern Access Corridor development project, the construction of an off-road cycling path and an upgrade of the Bruce Highway has been funded by the state and federal governments, with construction expected to be completed from 2021–2023.
