= Mount Peter, Queensland =

Mount Peter
- Suburb
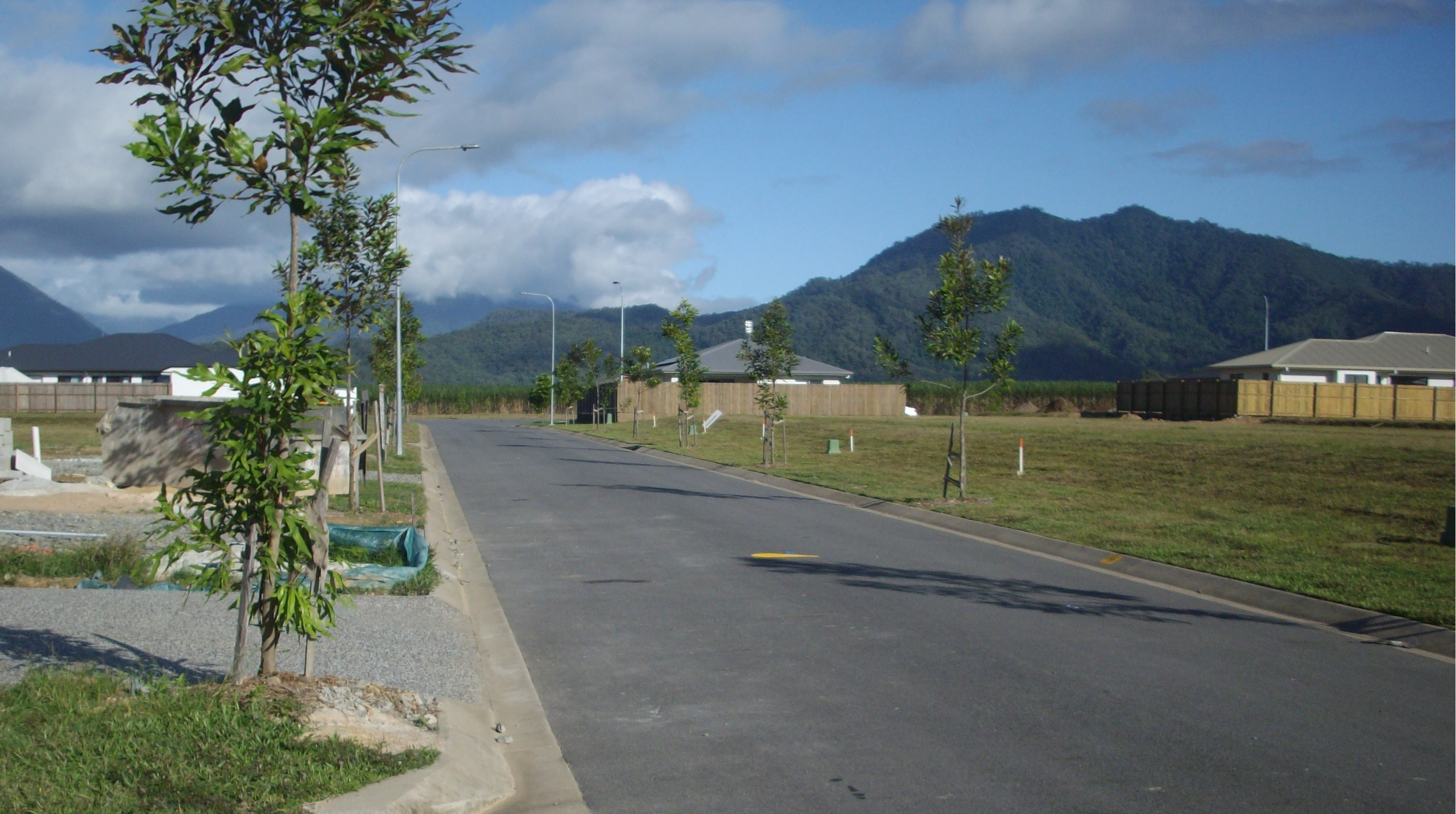
- Suburban development in Mount Peter, 2020

- Interactive map of Mount Peter
- Coordinates: 17.0627°S 145.7372°E
- Country: Australia
- State: Queensland
- LGA: Cairns Region
- Location: 6.5 km (4.0 mi) S of Edmonton; 11.6 km (7.2 mi) NW of Gordonvale; 18.8 km (11.7 mi) S of Cairns CBD; 1,696 km (1,054 mi) NNW of Brisbane

Government
  - State electorate: Mulgrave
  - Federal division: Kennedy

Area
  - Total: 17.8 km^{2} (6.9 sq mi)

Population
  - Total: 689 (2021 census)
  - Density: 38.71/km^{2} (100.3/sq mi)
- Time zone: UTC+10:00 (AEST)
- Postcode: 4869
Suburbs around Mount Peter
Lamb Range	Edmonton	Wrights Creek
Lamb Range	Mount Peter	Gordonvale
Lamb Range	Lamb Range	Gordonvale

Mount Peter is a mixed-use locality in the Cairns Region, Queensland, Australia. In the 2021 census, Mount Peter had a population of 689 people.

== Geography ==
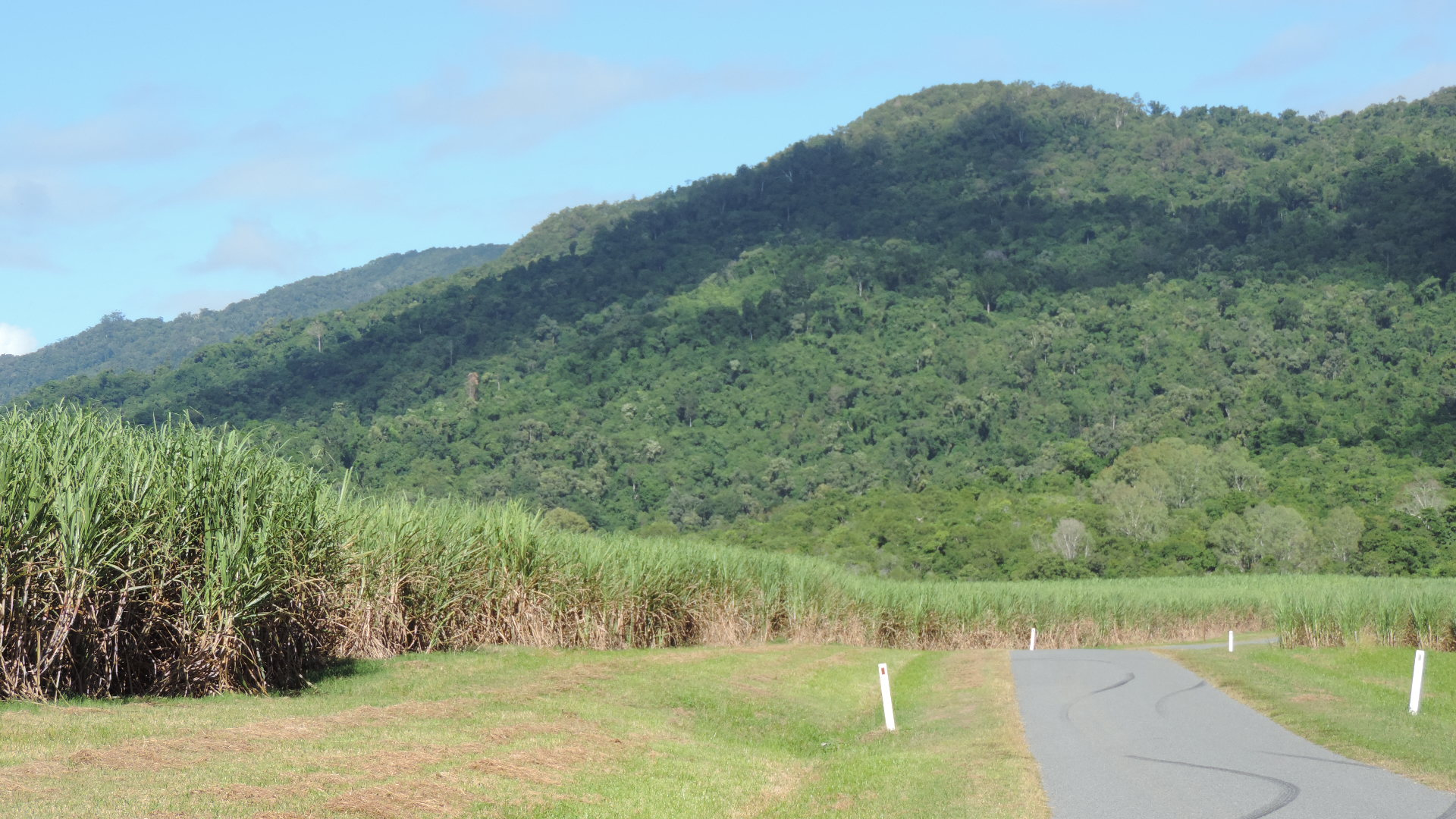
Rural view, looking south-west along Cooper Road, Mount Peter, towards the Lamb Range, 2018

Despite its name, the locality of Mount Peter is predominantly flat farming land (30–40 metres) nestled in the foothills of the Great Dividing Range in the south and western edge of the locality. The principal crop is sugarcane. There is also a quarry in the southern part of the locality.

The Bruce Highway and the North Coast railway line (immediately parallel and north-east of the highway) form the north-east boundary of the locality. A cane tramway delivers harvested sugarcane to the Mulgrave Sugar Mill in neighbouring Gordonvale; the tramway is part of north–south corridor through the Cairns urban area enabling sugarcane grown in the Barron River delta north of Cairns to reach the mill.

Due to continuing population growth in Cairns, Mount Peter has been identified as a priority urban growth corridor for Cairns with a master plan developed for 1582 hectares of land for development as 18,500 homes for approximately 40,000 people.

== History ==
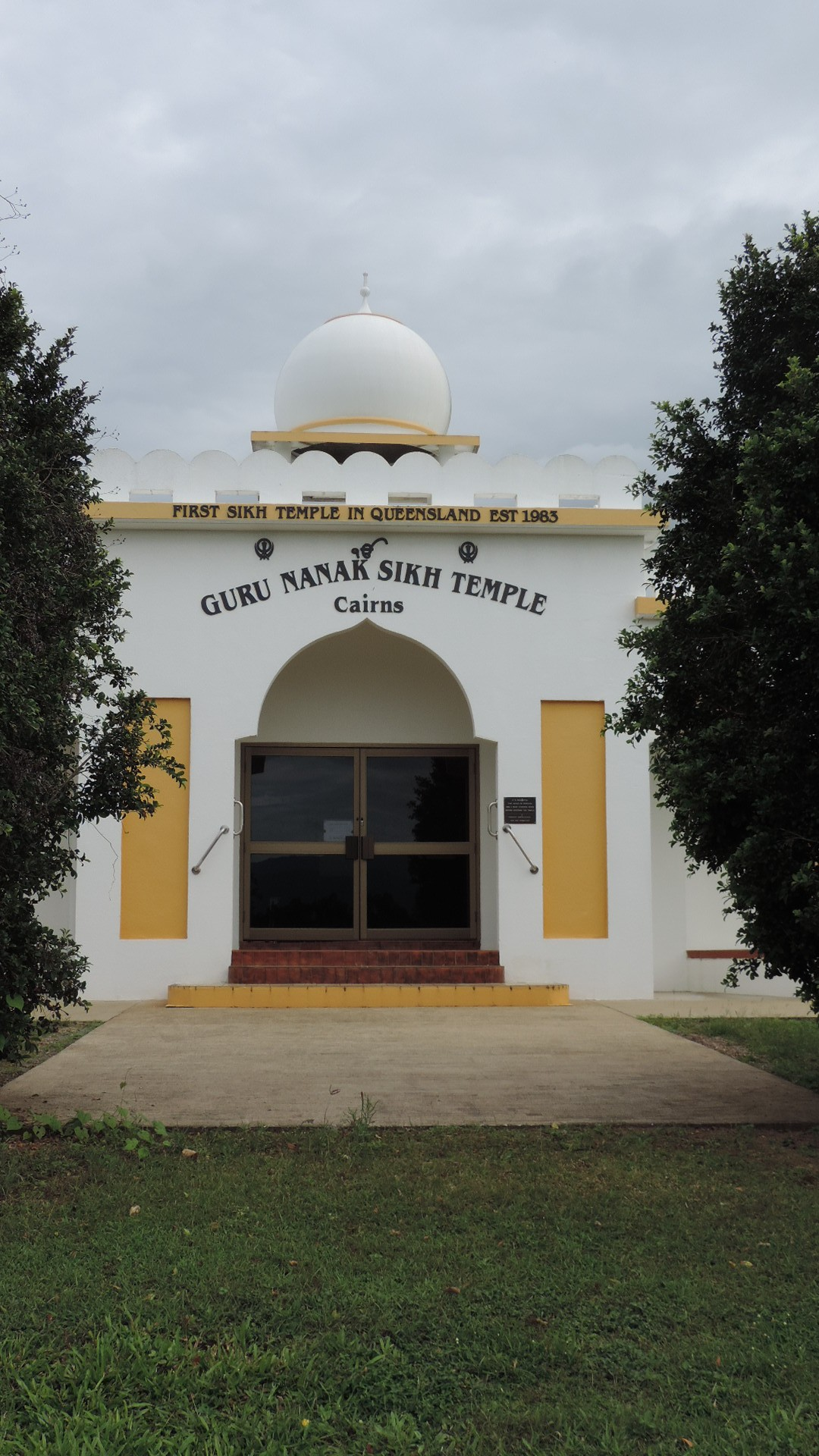
Guru Nanak Sikh Temple, 2016

Mount Peter is situated in the Yidinji traditional Aboriginal country.

The locality of Mount Peter is presumably named from the mountain of the same name in neighbouring Lamb Range, which in turn may have been named after Peter Petersen who established a sugarcane plantation in the area in about 1897. In May 1904, Petersen and his son Henry discovered gold on their property. They managed to mine the gold and keep it secret until 1915. By 1932, there were 40 people mining the gold field. The last mine to close was the Talisman Mine in 1985.

On 20 October 1983, the first Sikh temple in Queensland, the Guru Nanak Gurudwara, was opened at 289 Djarragun Way (just off the Bruce Highway) in Edmonton (now in Mount Peter, 17.03880°S 145.75824°E).

Mackillop Catholic College opened in 2016 for students in Prep to Year 3, planning to expand from Prep to Year 12 in a number of years. Year 7 secondary schooling commenced in 2019 with the first Year 12 cohort expected to graduate in 2025.

== Demographics ==
In the 2016 census, Mount Peter had a population of 92 people.

In the 2021 census, Mount Peter had a population of 689 people, reflecting the growth of suburban development within the locality.

== Education ==
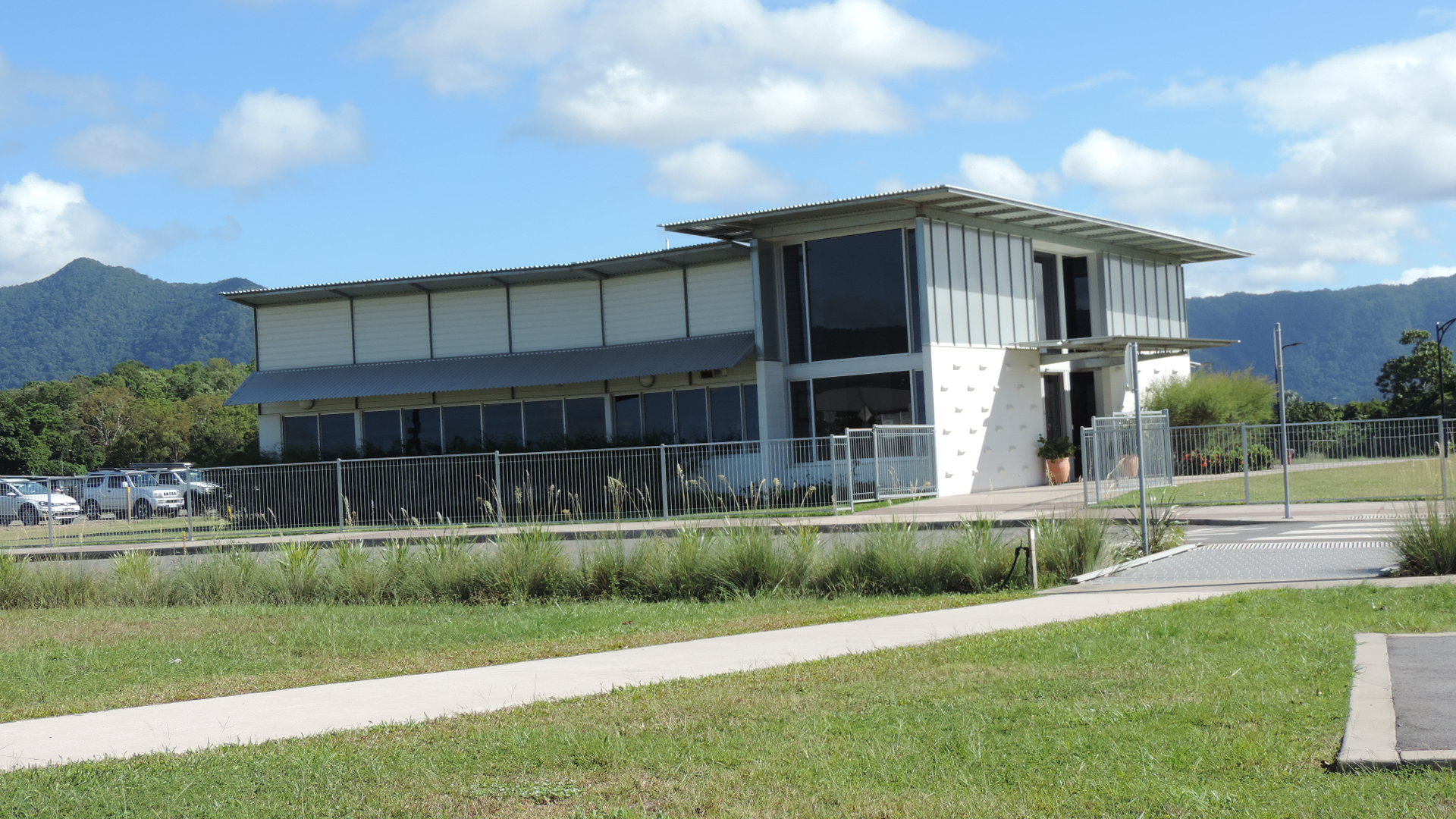
MacKillop Catholic College, 2018

MacKillop Catholic College is a private primary and secondary (Prep-12) school at 1 Mackillop Road (corner of Mt Peter Road, 17.0403°S 145.7404°E). As at 2022, the school was offering education from Prep to Year 9 with 486 primary students and 298 students secondary students (total 784 students) with 65 teachers (60.6 full-time equivalent) and 52 non-teaching staff (43.1 full-time equivalent).

There are no government schools in Mount Peter. The nearest government primary school is Hambledon State School in neighbouring Edmonton to the north. The nearest government secondary schools are Bentley Park College in Bentley Park to the north and Gordonvale State High School in neighbouring Gordonvale to the east.
