= Packers Camp =

- Suburb
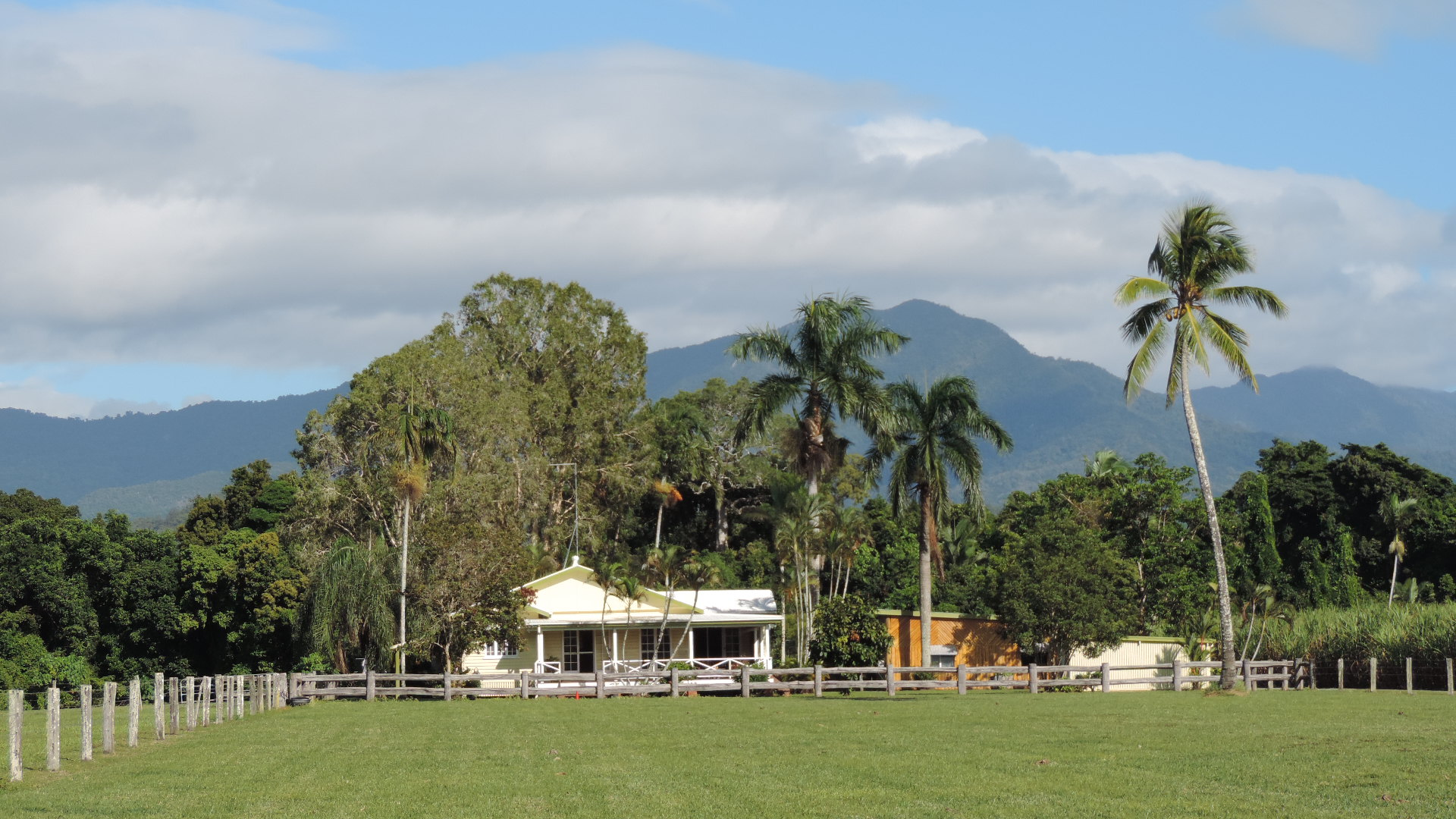
- Rural house, Packers Camp, 2018

- Interactive map of Packers Camp
- Coordinates: 17.0258°S 145.7991°E
- Country: Australia
- State: Queensland
- LGA: Cairns Region
- Location: 11.2 km (7.0 mi) NNE of Gordonvale; 27.0 km (16.8 mi) S of Cairns CBD; 334 km (208 mi) NNW of Townsville; 1,695 km (1,053 mi) NNW of Brisbane

Government
  - State electorate: Mulgrave
  - Federal division: Kennedy

Area
  - Total: 12.7 km^{2} (4.9 sq mi)

Population
  - Total: 136 (2021 census)
  - Density: 10.71/km^{2} (27.74/sq mi)
- Time zone: UTC+10:00 (AEST)
Suburbs around Packers Camp
Wrights Creek	East Trinity	Green Hill
Wrights Creek	Packers Camp	Green Hill
Wrights Creek	Gordonvale	Green Hill

Packers Camp is a rural locality in the Cairns Region, Queensland, Australia. In the 2021 census, Packers Camp had a population of 136 people.

== Geography ==
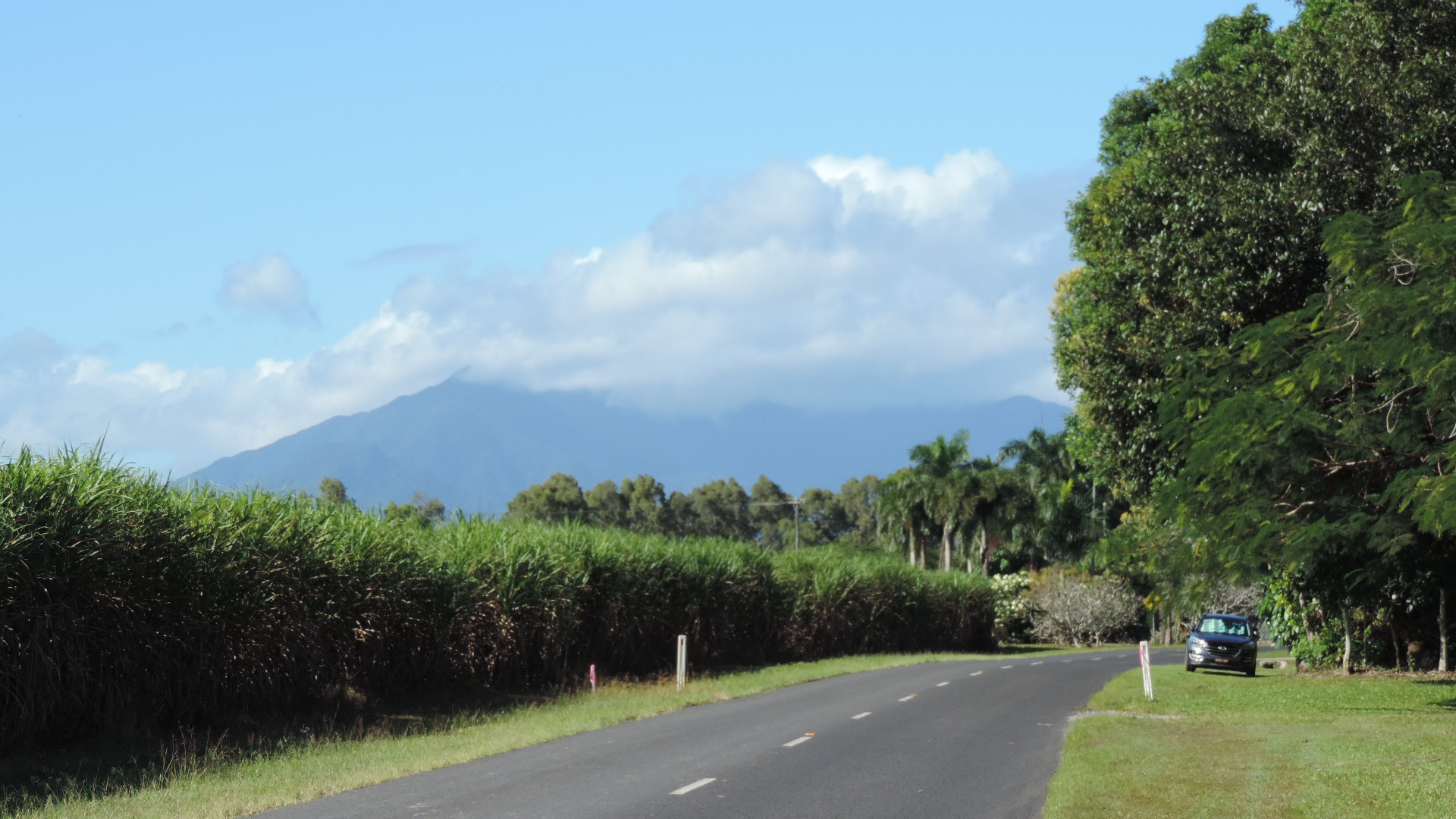
Sugarcane growing along Redbank Road, 2018

Pine Creek forms the northern boundary of the locality; Pine Creek Yarrabah Road forms the eastern and southern boundary of the locality; the Mackey Creek forms the western boundary. Simmonds Creek traverses the locality from south to north. All of these creeks become tributaries of the Redbank Creek which flows into Trinity Inlet and then to the Coral Sea at Cairns City.

Redbank Road runs from north to the south within the locality, connecting at the south to Wrights Creek and Gordonvale and through them to the Bruce Highway.

The land is flat and low-lying (less than 10 metres above sea level) and almost entirely freehold. The land is principally used for agricultural, mostly for growing sugarcane, with some scattered rural residences, mostly along Redbank Road. There is a cane tramway passing through the locality to transport the harvested sugarcane to the Mulgrave Sugar Mill.

== History ==
Packers Camp is situated in the Yidinji traditional Aboriginal country.

The locality was originally known as Highclere but its name changed to Highleigh in 1896. Later it became known as Packer Camp as it was the place where the horse, mule and bullock teams were loaded for the trip over the range to the goldfields.

A postal receiving office in 1895 but closed in 1898. In 1951 the Packers Creek post office opened, closing in 1971.

== Demographics ==
In the 2016 census, Packers Camp had a population of 106 people.

In the 2021 census, Packers Camp had a population of 136 people.

== Education ==
There are no schools in Packers Camp. The nearest government primary school is Gordonvale State School in neighbouring Gordonvale to the south. The nearest government secondary school is Gordonvale State High School, also in Gordonvale.

== Amenities ==
There is a boat ramp and floating walkway at Pine Creek Road into Mackey Creek (17.0107°S 145.7966°E). It is managed by the Cairns Regional Council.

== Attractions ==
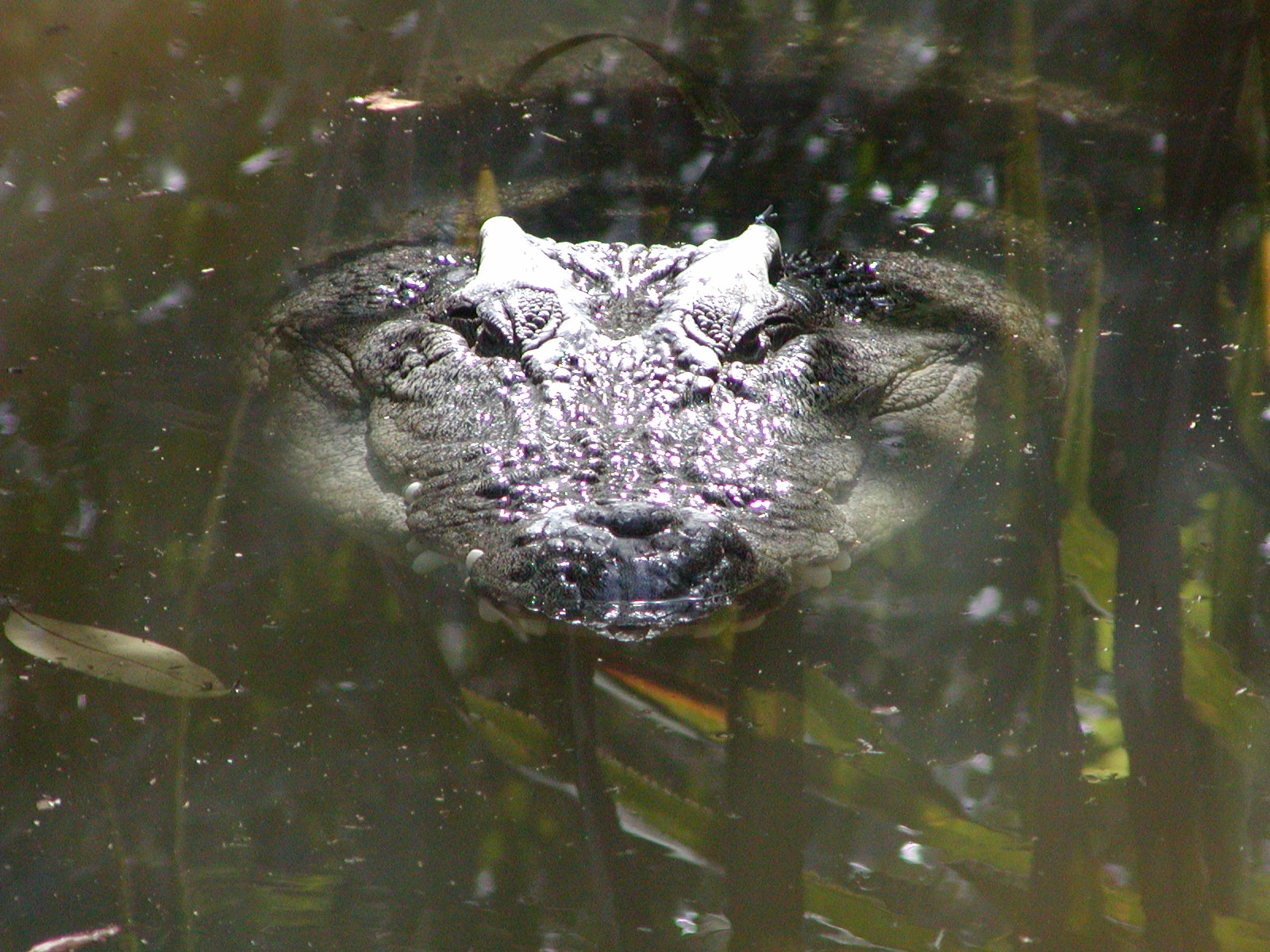
Crocodile at the farm, 2005

Cairns Crocodile Farm is in Redbank Road. It has operated as a commercial crocodile farm since 1989. Saltwater crocodiles are raised there for their meat and skins. Visits to the farm can be arranged through Hartley's Crocodile Adventures.
