= Green Hill, Queensland =

Green Hill
- Suburb
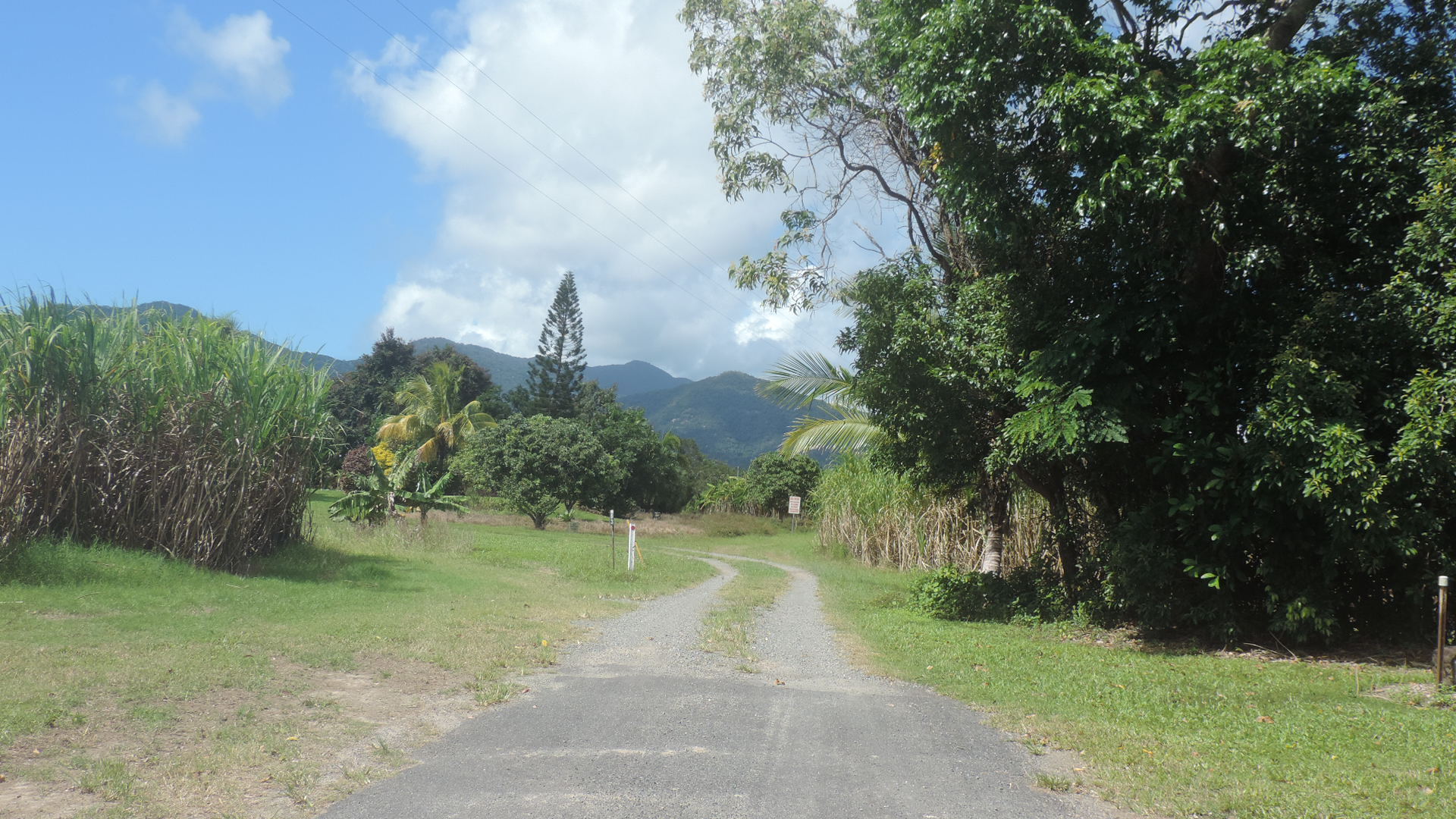
- Looking south-east along Nebbia Access Road, Green Hill, 2018

- Interactive map of Green Hill
- Coordinates: 17.0230°S 145.8333°E
- Country: Australia
- State: Queensland
- LGA: Cairns Region
- Location: 6.4 km (4.0 mi) NNE of Gordonvale; 23 km (14 mi) S of Cairns CBD; 332 km (206 mi) NNW of Townsville; 1,667 km (1,036 mi) NNW of Brisbane

Government
  - State electorate: Mulgrave
  - Federal division: Kennedy

Area
  - Total: 37.8 km^{2} (14.6 sq mi)

Population
  - Total: 177 (2021 census)
  - Density: 4.683/km^{2} (12.13/sq mi)
- Time zone: UTC+10:00 (AEST)
- Postcode: 4865
Suburbs around Green Hill
East Trinity	East Trinity	Yarrabah
Packers Camp	Green Hill	Yarrabah
Gordonvale	Aloomba	Aloomba

Green Hill is a rural locality in the Cairns Region, Queensland, Australia. In the 2021 census, Green Hill had a population of 177 people.

== Geography ==
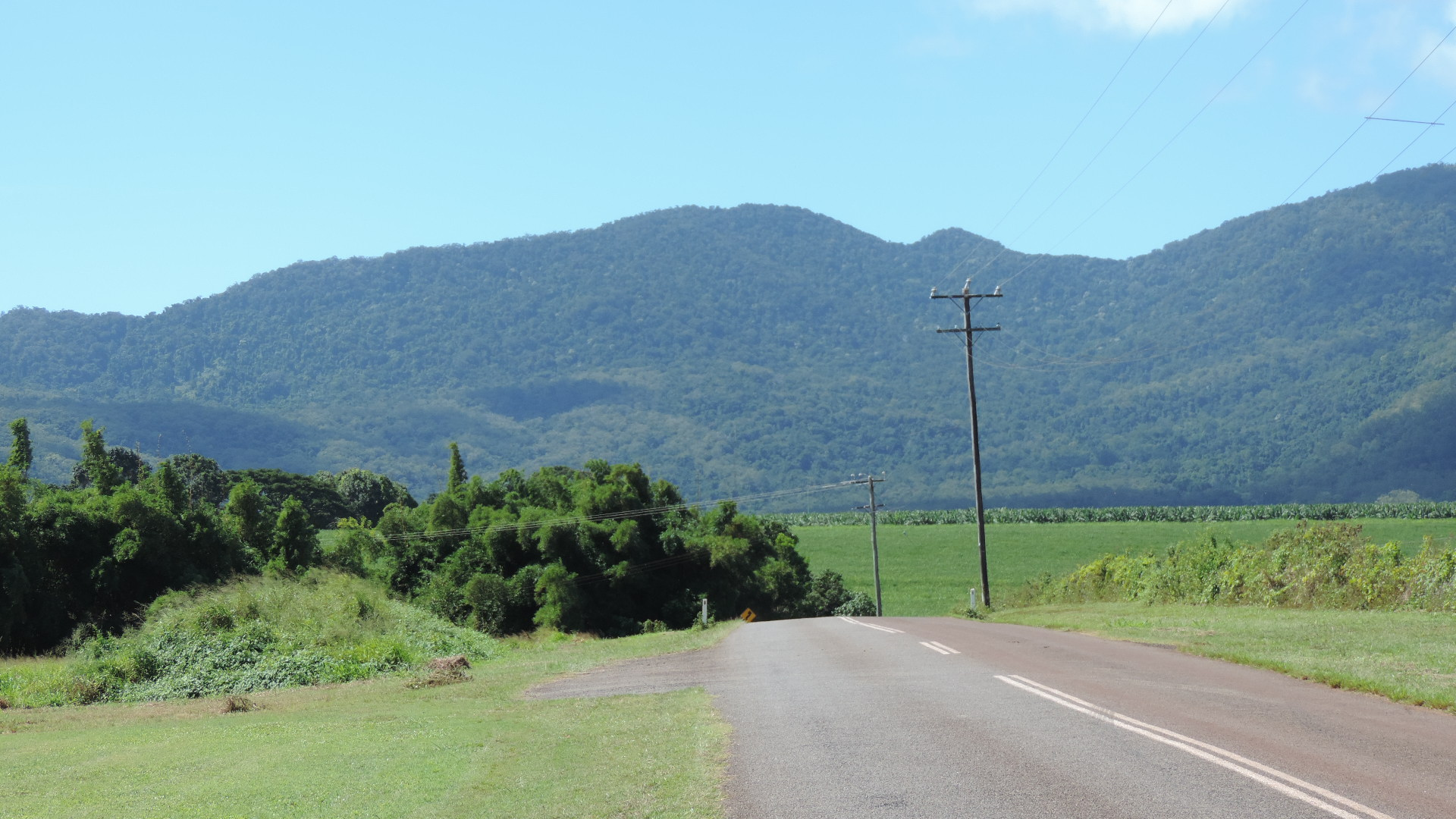
Looking east along Greenhill Road over the low-lying farmland with the Malbon Thompson Range rising beyond, 2018

Pine Creek Yarrabah Road forms the western boundary of the locality, while the eastern boundary is formed by the ridgeline of the Malbon Thompson Range. The land in the west of the locality is lower-lying (10–50 metres above sea level) freehold land used for agriculture (predominantly sugarcane) and some rural residences. The land in the east of the locality is mountainous and undeveloped land rising rapidly from 50 metres (160 ft) above sea level to the mountain ridge on the eastern boundary, where the highest peak is Grey Peaks in the south-east of the locality in the Malbon Thompson Range (17.0458°S 145.8652°E) at 644 metres (2,113 ft) above sea level.

The north-east of the locality is protected as the Malbon Thompson Forest Reserve, while the south-east of the locality is the Grey Peaks National Park. There are no access roads tand no public facilities in the Grey Peaks National Park. Due to the steep terrain, the area has not been logged and contains a mixture of sclerophyll and rainforest vegetation. The sclerophyll forest contains red mahogany Eucalyptus pellita and red turpentine Syncarpia glomulifera trees.

Apart from these protected areas, the land in the locality is almost entirely used to grow sugarcane. There is a network of cane tramways in the western part of the locality to transport the harvested sugarcane to the Mulgrave Sugar Mill.

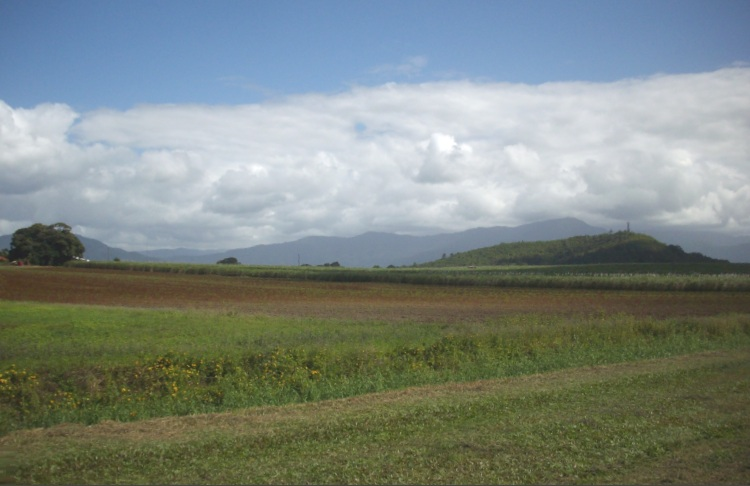
View from Gray Road with the Green Hill geographical feature

Green Hill is in the south-west of the locality (17.0401°S 145.8086°E) at 131 metres (430 ft) above sea level. The hill is the remnant of a volcano that erupted about 986,000 years ago. It is believed that the volcano's eruption altered the course of the Mulgrave River so that instead of having its mouth on Trinity Inlet, the mouth become directly onto the Coral Sea some 40 km further south. However, further research has shown river sediments above the basalt flows and it is now believed that other factors such as alluvial sediments may have altered the river's course and that perhaps it has alternated between the two mouths over time.

== History ==
Green Hill is situated in the Yidinji traditional Aboriginal country.

The locality was originally called Crescent Hill, but was renamed Green Hill around the 1890s.

== Demographics ==
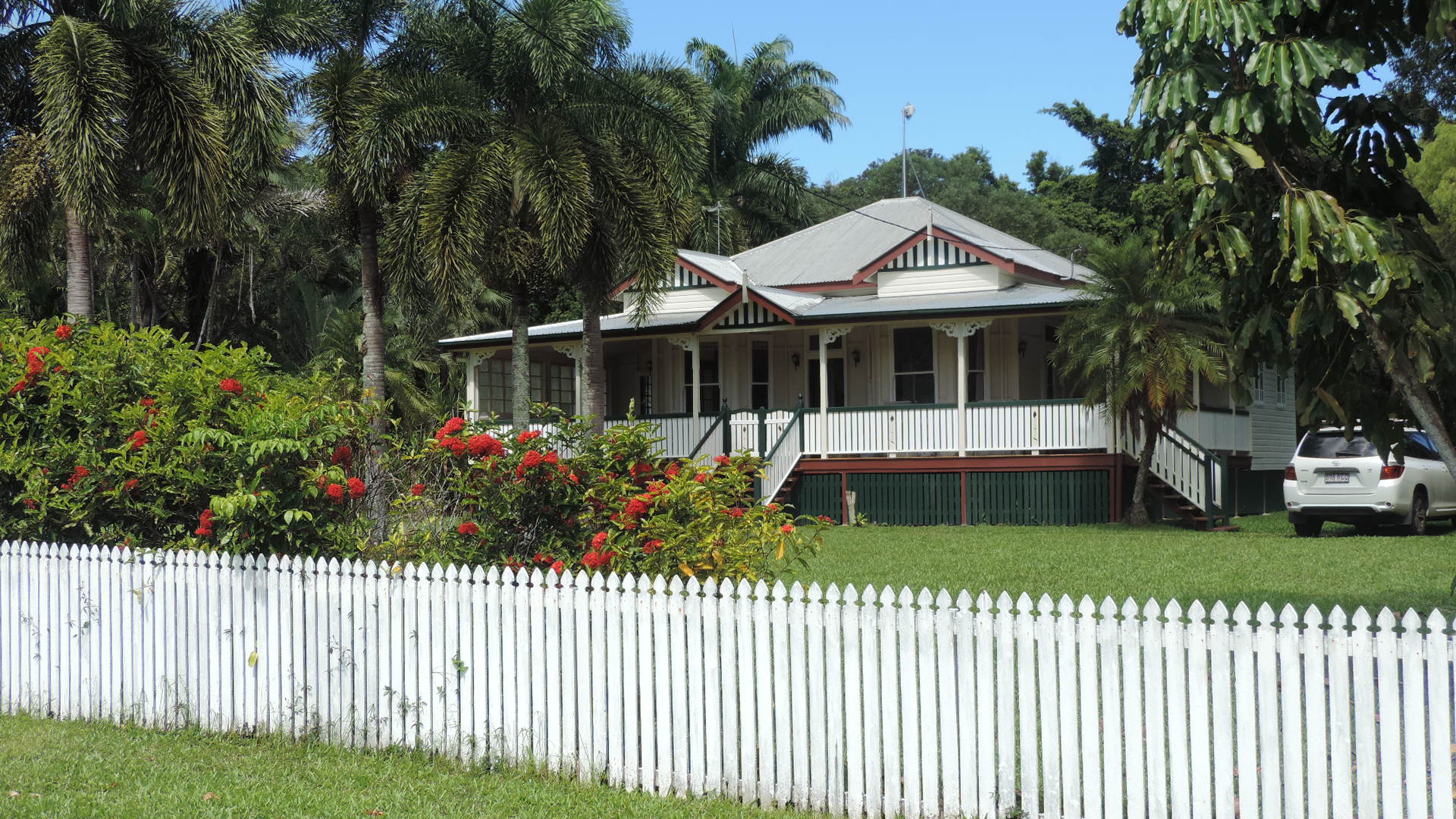
Traditional "Queenslander" house with wide verandas, Green Hill, 2018

In the 2016 census, Green Hill had a population of 159 people.

In the 2021 census, Green Hill had a population of 177 people.

== Education ==
There are no schools in the locality. The nearest primary and secondary schools are Gordonvale State School and Gordonvale State High School, both in neighbouring Gordonvale to the south-west.
