= St. Therese's School =

St Therese's Primary School

Location
- Cairns, Queensland; Australia
- 17°00′25″S 145°43′53″E

Information
- Type: Catholic primary school
- Motto: Latin: Multis Coniunctis Magna Perfecta (Through the work of many, united as one, great things are done)
- Established: 1929; 97 years ago
- Principal: David Adams-Jones
- Enrolment: 670
- Campus: Bentley Park
- Colours: Red, white and black
- Website: www.stthereses.qld.edu.au

St Therese's Primary School is a Catholic primary school in Bentley Park, Cairns, Queensland, Australia.

== History ==
The first Catholic School in Edmonton, Edmonton Convent School – was established on 29 April 1929, with an enrolment of 30 students. In 1965, Edmonton was established as a separate Parish – St Therese's Parish, and the school was renamed St Therese's School, Edmonton. The community initially received the services of priests from St Monica's Cathedral Parish, then from St Joseph's Parish, Cairns.

The new school was opened by Bishop Torpie in July 1969. In 1976, the Sisters of Mercy, who had staffed the school throughout its history, withdrew from the Parish. In 1995 the school was moved to a new site at Centenary Park, which was renamed Bentley Park. Parish Priest, John McGrath, takes a keen interest in all matters pertaining to the religious and pastoral life of the school and regularly conducts school and class masses.

== Overview ==
St. Therese's School services the southern suburbs of Cairns. Situated in Bentley Park, the school has reached four-stream status which means that there are 4 classes of each year level. This current student population is approximately 670 students from P - 6. The school has just recently spent a considerable amount of money renovating a number of teaching blocks, establishing a Friendship Garden and the establishment of a state of the art Prep Playground.

The parent body consists largely of parents whose work profiles are linked to tourism or associated industries. There are some forty-two nationalities comprising a well-diversified student population at St. Therese's, most of them second or third generation Australians. The school has a well established, experienced and hard working teaching team which focus on improving education outcomes for all students at the school.

== See also ==
- Catholic Education Cairns
