= Sugarworld =

Water park in Edmonton, Queensland

Coordinates: 17°01′16″S 145°43′32″E

Sugarworld is a council-owned community water park, located in Edmonton, Cairns Region, Queensland, Australia. Its main attractions are water slides, pools, mini-golf and the canteen area. Sugarworld also includes a large amount of land occupied with a large variety of native animals and plant life. In 2010, Sugarworld closed due to safety precautions regarding the condition and maintenance of the water slides, which was judged to be too low to be safe. The topic of the park became a community debate, with most of the Edmonton community wanting the park to re-open. After significant discussions, a complete renovation of the water slides was set to occur sometime by December 2011, with the park re-opening before 2012. On Monday 20 December 2011, the park reopened its water slides and no further issues have been reported. In February, 2017 Belgravia Leisure group were appointed by Cairns Regional Council to manage the facility. In October 2018 a 9-hole adventure mini-golf course was completed and opened to the public as a new feature of the waterpark.
