= Arlington Reef =

Reef in Australia

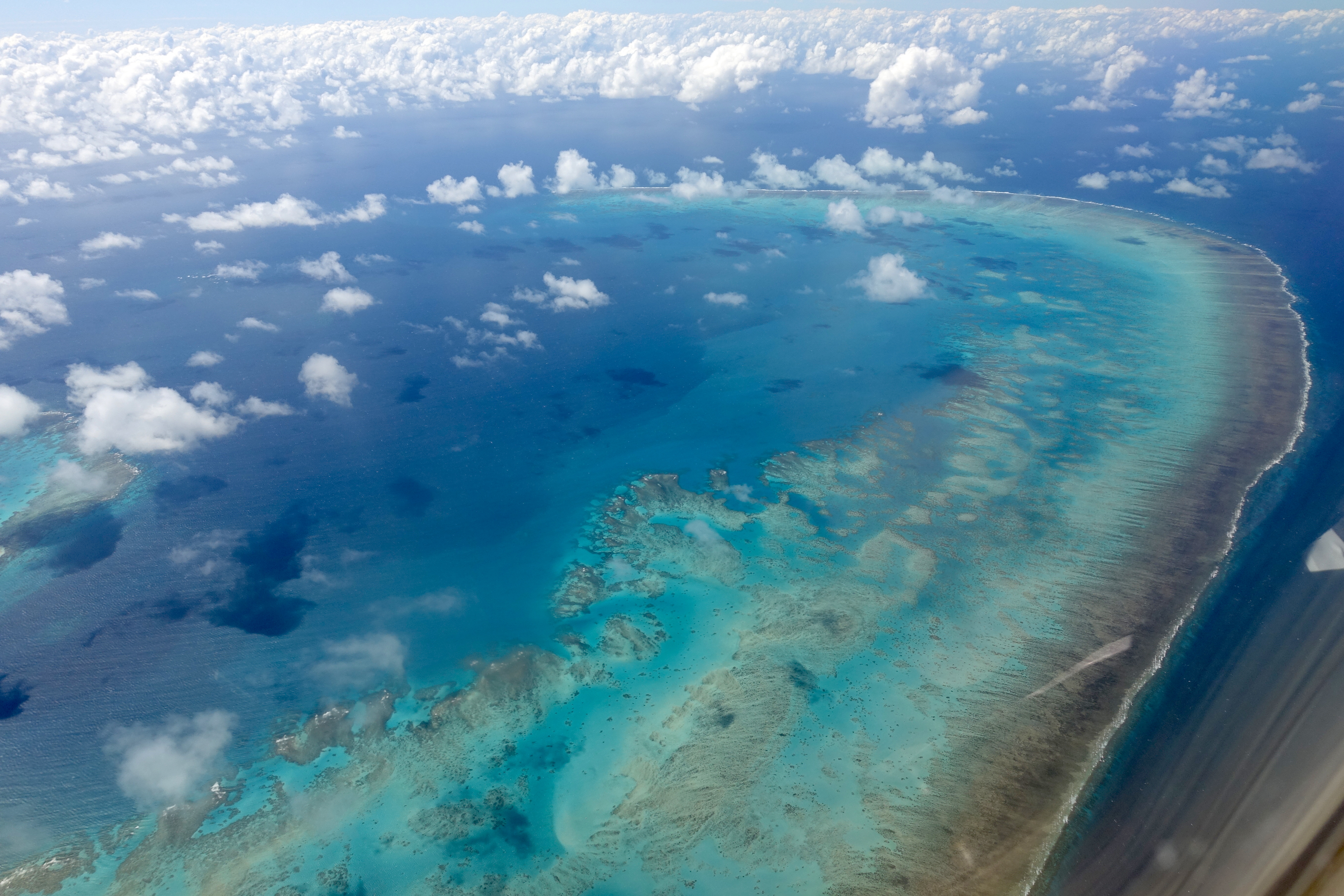
- Aerial view of Arlington Reef.
- Interactive map of Arlington Reef

Geography
- Location: Great Barrier Reef, Coral Sea
- Coordinates: 16°42′S 146°3′E

Administration
- Australia
- State: Queensland

Arlington Reef is one of the major coral reefs of the Great Barrier Reef in the Coral Sea. The reef is located roughly 40 km north-east of Cairns. The Australian Institute of Marine Science first survey the corals of Arlington Reef in 1987 and has been subsequently monitoring them since then.
