= Cairns-Mulgrave Tramway =

Australian tram line

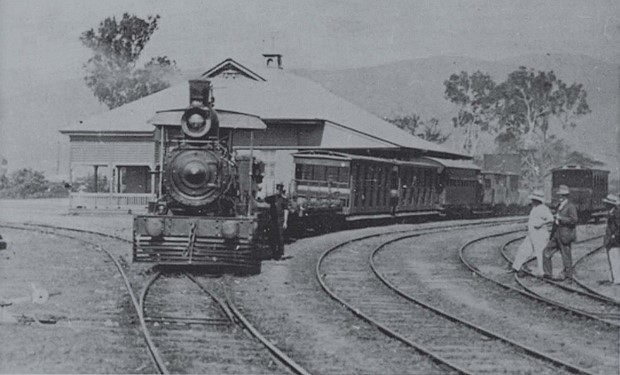
- The Cairns-Mulgrave Tramway

Technical
- Line length: 31 miles (50 km)
- Track gauge: 3 ft 6 in (1,067 mm)

The Cairns-Mulgrave Tramway was a private tram line from Cairns to the Mulgrave River in Queensland, Australia. It was built until 1897 to serve the Mulgrave Central Sugar Mill, built in 1895. The line, which led through difficult terrain including dense jungle, was built by the Cairns Divisional Board, later renamed Cairns Shire Council, at a cost of £15,319. The line originally ran from Cairns to Nelson, later renamed Gordonvale. In 1898 it was extended to Aloomba, and in 1910 it was finally extended to Babinda, over a length of 50 kilometres (31 mi). The end point in Cairns was between Spence and Bunda Street, adjacent to the Queensland Government's Cairns railway station, with which the line was connected by a short distance.

The line was officially opened on 3 May 1897 with an excursion from Cairns to Nelson. Initially, the Cairns Divisional Board had only one small locomotive, built in 1879 in Philadelphia, USA, and a second locomotive was added in 1898. In the beginning, passenger coaches and good carriages were rented from the Queensland Government until the company acquired its own stock from Phoenix Engineering Co and Shillito & Sons, both based in Ipswich. Later, ten F wagons and five H wagons and two wooden wagons were bought from the Toowoomba Foundry Company. In the year up to 30 June 1899, the tramway carried 54,996 passengers and 71,688 tonnes of freight. The service was so successful that a payment of £892 was made to the government. On 1 July 1911, the Queensland Government bought the line and integrated it into Queensland Rail.

== History ==
=== Planning ===
The formation of the Mulgrave Central Mill Company Ltd in November 1893 under the provisions of the Sugar Works Guarantee Act 1893 gave rise to the idea that a fourteen miles long tramway with a gauge of 2 ft should be constructed by the board from Cairns to the Mulgrave River. The mill company was registered on 20 April 1895. In May, Mr O. Phillips, at the request of the board, inspected the proposed route and reported upon the proposal. His recommendation that the normal railway gauge of the colony should be adopted was agreed to, and it was decided to retain his services as consulting engineer for the purposes of the tramway. Towards the end of May the survey was commenced, following, wherever practicable, existing roads of the division. In July the survey was completed to the Mulgrave, the minimum curve being 10 chains (201 m) radius, and the steepest gradient 1 in 82½.

=== Construction ===
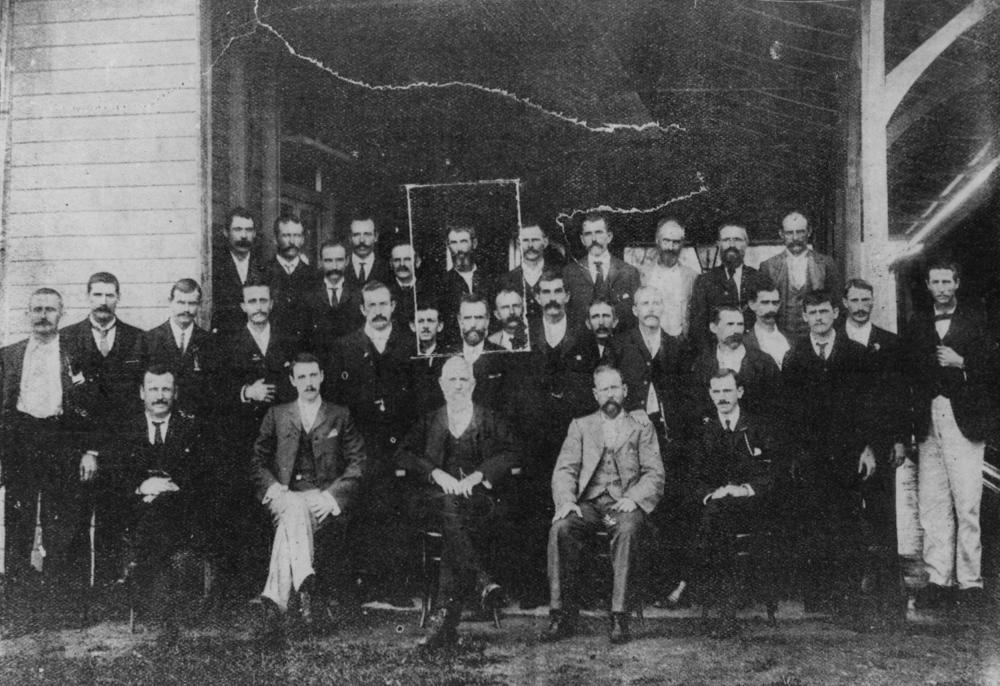
Staff of the Cairns-Mulgrave Tramway, c. 1905

The board having complied with the regulations and provisions of the various Local Government Acts, and having arranged for a loan from the government, tenders were invited for the construction of the line to the Mulgrave, and that of Messrs. Kirk Brothers and Frew (£15,319 13s.) was accepted by the board, and the work was satisfactorily completed towards the end of April 1897. The line was entirely unfenced, but in other respects, the usual railway practice of the colony has been followed, except that the formation is only 12 ft. wide, whilst soil ballast has been chiefly used. Several of the bridges also were low-level.

The average cost per mile open, for construction only, to 30 June 1898. including two miles of mixed gauge, was £1827. In order to facilitate the operations of the Mulgrave Central Mill Company, the board consented to lay two miles of mixed gauge, thus enabling the mill company's narrow gauge locomotives to haul cane and firewood over the board's tramway from 11¾ miles to the mill. A similar arrangement was made for about 1½ miles on the Aloomba extension.

=== Inauguration ===
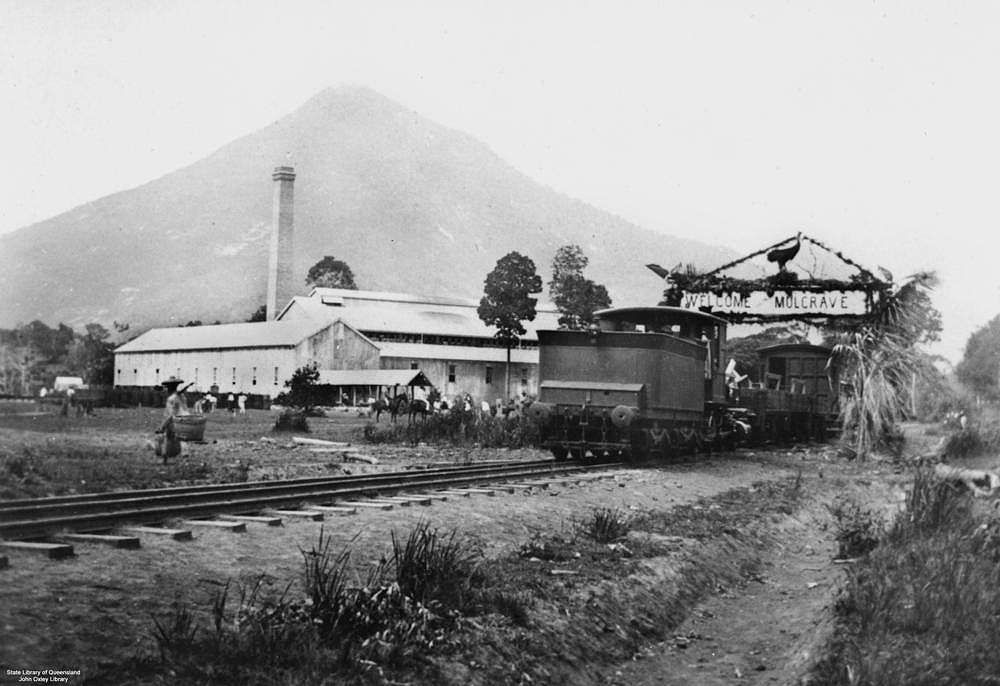
Opening of the Cairns-Mulgrave tramway on 3 May 1897 at the Mulgrave sugar mill, Gordonvale

The first section, in length 13 miles 75 chains 19 links was opened for public traffic on 3 May 1897. At that time the entire rolling stock available for use comprised one 11 inch cylinder locomotive, built at the Baldwin Locomotive Works in Philadelphia, U.S.A., in 1879(purchased from the Railway Department, Cairns, for the sum of £700), and five second-hand ballast wagons, purchased at Gladstone from the railway contractors Messrs. James Overend & Co for the sum of £125. Subsequently, ten F waggons, five H wagons, and two timber wagons were built for the board by the Toowoomba Foundry Company. A tramcar with seating accommodation for sixty passengers, which had been previously in use on the government lines, was purchased from the Railway Department, in Brisbane for £100. With the assistance of a guard's van and a convertible car, the latter was exclusively for indigenous passengers — hired from the Railway Department, together with other passenger and goods stock hired from the department as occasion demanded, the board was enabled to cope with the rapidly increasing traffic in the first year in a fairly satisfactory manner. The total cost of the board's rolling-stock in use to 30 June 1898, was £2879 8s. 8d., equal to £206 11s. per mile open.

The Cairns-Mulgrave Tramway was the first public tramway in Australia. The line from Cairns to Aloomba was initially 17 miles long. It had the same gauge as the Queensland Government Railways (3 ft 6 in) and used the same rails. Thus all rolling stock was interchangeable. The first engine and carriages were purchased from the government, and government carriages were frequently hired, when the rush of passenger traffic overwhelmed the tramway's resources.

The train only stopped by signal to take on passengers or parcels, with the passengers wishing to alight giving notice to the guard at the preceding station.

=== First extension ===
In consequence of the subdivision and planting with cane of a large area of rich scrub land on the southern side of the Mulgrave River, in connection with the proposed Aloomba Central Mill, which, however, eventually fell through, the board decided to extend the tramway across the river as far as the main Russell road, a distance of 3 miles 61 chains. Subsequently, the cane farmers on the Aloomba Estate arranged with the board to carry some 30,000 tons of cane from Aloomba to the Colonial Refining Company's mill at Hambledon, a distance of about twelve miles, at the rate of 10d. per ton for the first year, the company at the same time agreeing with the board to construct at their own cost a branch line about 2 miles in length on a gauge of 3 ft. 6 in. to connect their mill with the tramway.

In July 1897, the board entered into a contract for the construction of two low-level timber bridges, having a total length of 660 ft. at the tramway crossing of the Mulgrave River. The bridges were built entirely with Southern timber. On 1 April 1898, the construction of the Aloomba extension was commenced from the southern bank of the river, and, with the exception of the Mulgrave Bridge, was carried out by day labour, being complete and opened for traffic in August, 1898.

Although the road was chiefly ballasted with soil, and was entirely unfenced, thus exposing the formation to the free passage of cattle and horses, no difficulty has been experienced in maintaining a fair top on the rail road, sufficiently good for the maximum speed allowed. Stone ballast has been put on the rail road during maintenance as it appeared advisable, but the total quantity thus put out in the first year (exclusive of 1500 yards used in construction) did not exceed 700 cubic yards. Although the wet season was fairly heavy (78.311 in. between 1 December 1897 and 30 April 1898), the traffic was not interrupted in any way.

On the extension to Aloomba a siding was laid in the bed of the Mulgrave River from which an ample supply of clean coarse sand and shingle, suitable for ballast, was obtainable. This ballast could be put out on the rail road at an average cost of 2s. 6d. per cubic yard. As opportunity offers, the line was gradually reballasted with this material.

=== Maintenance and operation ===
The total mileage maintained to 30 June 1898, was 15.027 miles, including sidings, and the total expenditure on maintenance for the whole period of one year and fifty-nine days was £917 os. 8d., equal to £65 15s. 8d. per mile of main line only for the whole period, and £56 12s. 8d. per mile of main line only for the twelve months that ended on 30 June 1898. The cost per train mile for the whole period was 9¼d.

With the exception of the sum of £886 16s. expended on the Mulgrave Bridge and approaches out of a sum of £1500 granted for that purpose by the government, the whole of the capital account consiste of money borrowed from the government under the provisions of the Local Works Loans Act 1880. Including the £886 16s. above referred to, the total capital on 30 June 1898, amounted to £44,281. The revenue derived from the working of the tramway from the opening of the first section on 3 May 1897 to 30 June 1898, a period of one year and 59 days, was as follows:

- Passengers: £2504
- Goods and miscellaneous: £2874
- Total: £5878
- Deduct working expenses: £3424
- Net revenue: £1953

The percentage of working expenses to revenue was 63.67, and of net revenue to capital expended on open line 6.89 for the whole period. After payments of interest to the Treasury, in addition to working expenses, the revenue balance on 30 June 1898, was £696. On 30 June 1899 the total capital amounted to £52,572 14s. 4d., the expenditure from which has been £50,220, leaving an unexpended balance to the credit of the Tramway Loan Fund of £2352, this amount not having been drawn from the Treasury on that date. Interest actually paid by the board up to 30 June 1899 amounted to £2969, and redemption to £892. The total revenue has been £14,967, and the net revenue £5344.

The percentage of working expenses to revenue for the twelve months was £64.64, and for the whole period during which the tramway has been working, £64.29; in other words, every £100 earned by the tramway from the date of opening on the 3rd May, 1897, to 30 June 1899, cost £64 5s. 10¾d. The percentage of net revenue to capital expended on open line for the twelve months ended 30 June last is £6 18s. 1½d., as compared with £5 18s. 8d. for the previous twelve months. After deducting working expenses and payments to the Treasury on account of interest and redemption, the revenue balance for the twelve months ended on 30 June 1899 was £735.

=== Second year of operation ===
54,996 passengers were carried in twelve months up to 30 June 1899. The receipts from passenger fares amounted to £3013, an increase of £508 as compared with the period of one year and fifty-nine days ended on 8 June 1898. The average fare paid by the 54,996 passengers carried was 13.16d. The coaching traffic amounted to 31.4 per cent of the gross revenue, as compared with 46.6 per cent for the period previous to 30 June 1898.

There was seating accommodation for 180 passengers, but there were times when this was insufficient, and two composite passenger cars were built by the Phoenix Engineering Company, of Ipswich. They had plain but suitable accommodation for about 20 first-class and 35 second-class passengers each. They were due for delivery in December 1899.

In addition to general merchandise, the goods traffic comprises bananas and fruit, sugarcane, manufactured sugar from the Mulgrave and Hambledon mills, round timber, firewood, soil for filling-up purposes in town, road metal for the council, mineral ores from the Russell and Herberton districts, and ships' ballast. The minimum charge was 3s. 9d. per ton for ordinary merchandise, and 2s. 6d. per ton for agricultural produce other than raw sugar and sugar cane; the latter was carried from Aloomba to Hambledon (12 miles) for 14d. per ton. The minimum charge made by the Railway Department for the carriage of sugarcane in full truckloads, a distance of fifteen miles and under, is 20d. per ton; in 1898 the charge on the tramway was 10d. per ton for the Aloomba-Hambledon service, but this was found by actual experience to be unremunerative, bearing in mind the large capital expenditure incurred for the special purpose of enabling the Aloomba farmers to harvest their cane. The total weight of goods carried during the twelve months was 71,688 tons, for £6353, equal to 66.25 per cent of the gross revenue.

The length of line maintained in 1898, including sidings, but exclusive of mixed gauge, was 20.22 miles. The mixed gauge portion of the line, in length 3.2375 miles, carried 9253 tons of cane and firewood on the narrow gauge, in addition to the board's ordinary traffic on the broader gauge. The actual mileage maintained, including the mixed gauge, was, therefore, equivalent to 23.5075 miles, and the cost per mile £56 5s. 11¾d.

The train mileage increased from 23,590 miles for the period of one year and fifty-nine days, up to 30 June 1898, to 43,481 miles tor the twelve months up to 30 June 1898, an increase of 84.3 per cent, whilst the expenditure on maintenance increased by 44.3 per cent.

=== Rolling stock ===
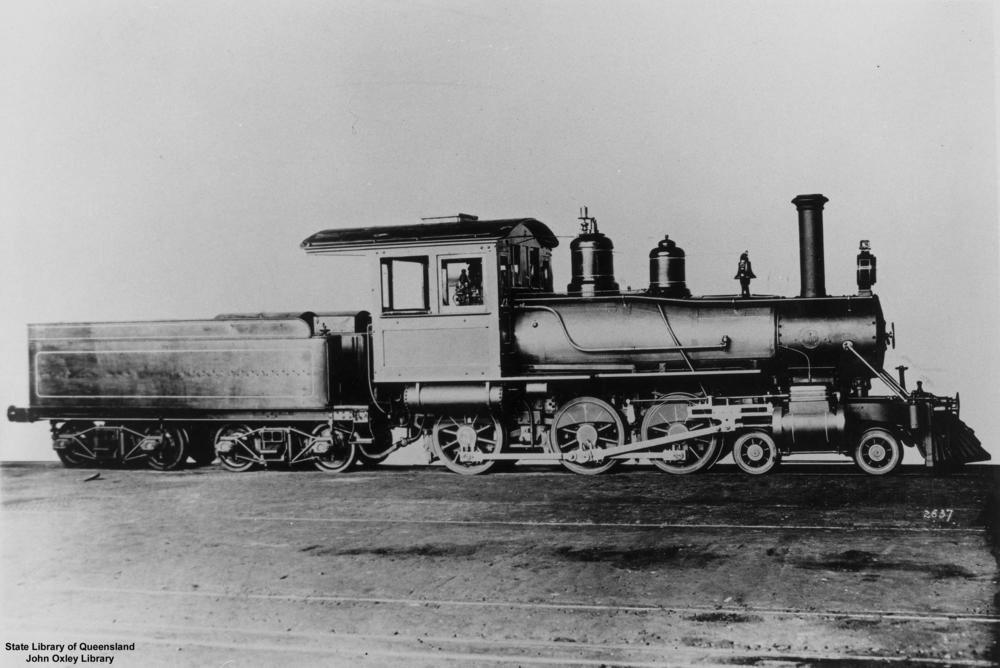
Baldwin B13 class steam locomotive No. 5, 1892. It was purchased in 1911 by the Cairns-Mulgrave Tramway and used there until 1924.

The board's rolling stock consisted in 1899 of three locomotives, 5 passenger cars, 69 goods waggons, and two guards' vans.

A Class 5 steam locomotive was built in February 1908 by Burnham, Williams & Co with works number 32678 for the Cairns-Mulgrave Tramway.

A small B11 Baldwin Class engine was initially ordered for the Great Northern Railway. It had a remarkable career with numerous changes in ownership. It was assembled in Townsville and then sold to a contractor before it had even entered service. It was later repurchased only to be again resold to the same contractor. Repurchased again it was then sold to Cairns-Mulgrave Tramway only to be returned when tramway assets were acquired under the North Coast Railway Act 1910.

=== Second extension ===
A proposal was under consideration in December 1899 for the extension of the tramway from Aloomba into the heart of the Russell River district, which is embraced in the Cairns division, and for which the port of Cairns is the natural outlet. In conjunction with this proposal there is a scheme for the establishment of a central mill at Babinda Creek, which would serve and be served by the extension. The distance from Aloomba to Babinda Creek is twenty miles. The Government has placed £65,000 on the estimates for the purpose of equipping the mill under the Sugar Works Guarantee Act, and there would probably be 10,000 tons of sugar to be conveyed from this mill to port each season, as almost the whole of the country along the line is agricultural land.

It was estimated that there were available already about 33,000 acres. 24,700 acres of which were classed as first-class, 4500 acres as second-class. Since the survey has been made, about 4000 acres In addition have been taken up in anticipation of the building of the mill and the railway, and there was a further considerable area of land not yet alienated which was estimated at 20,000 acres. The Cairns Chamber of Commence has taken the matter up, and was vigorously pushing it to a conclusion. In addition to the sugar prospects there was an unlimited quantity of valuable timber, which was at present worthless because of the want or means of carriage. It is urged in support of the scheme that the Mulgrave Central Mill has disbursed £130,000 among the farmers and wage-earners, and has paid the Government as interest £4264. The farmers on Aloomba Estate have earned £30,000 from cane growing in the last two seasons. A similar and even better result was anticipated, if the tramway would have been extended to the Russell district, in conjunction with a central sugar-mill.

=== Higher bridge ===
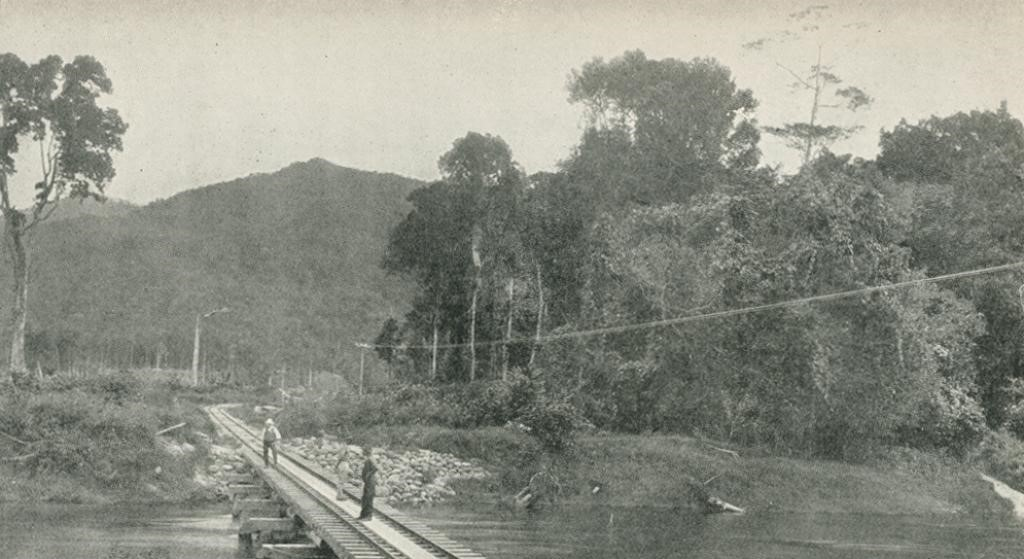
Railway bridge over Babinda Creek on the Cairns-Mulgrave Line, 1912. The mountain in the background is Mount Bellenden Ker

The Cairns Shire Council kept a boat at the Mulgrave River because the low-level bridge was regularly flooded. On one occasion, the engine was rushed through floodwaters, when the water was already over the bridge and high enough that it nearly put the fire out. In January 1907 the water level was up to 20 feet (6.1 m) over the bridge. Thus a new bridge at a higher level was built over the Mulgrave River and completed in mid 1935. It was built to 12 ton axle load as part of the program to strengthen the line. Its completion enabled C16 and C17 class locomotives to operate between Cairns and Babinda instead of only PB15 and B15 class and lighter engines. Expenditure on the bridge and deviation in 1934–35 amounted to £13,720. Although higher than the first bridge, the second bridge was still subject to frequent flooding. This curved wooden bridge was one of the last major river crossings on the North Coast Line, and has now been replaced by a third high level pre stressed concrete structure.

=== Nationalisation ===
On 1 July 1911, the Queensland Government bought the line (including all inventories) from Cairns Shire Council for £158,650 and integrated it into the State Railway System. This line became the northernmost segment of the Sunshine Route.

== See also ==
- List of tramways in Queensland
