= Bentley Park College =

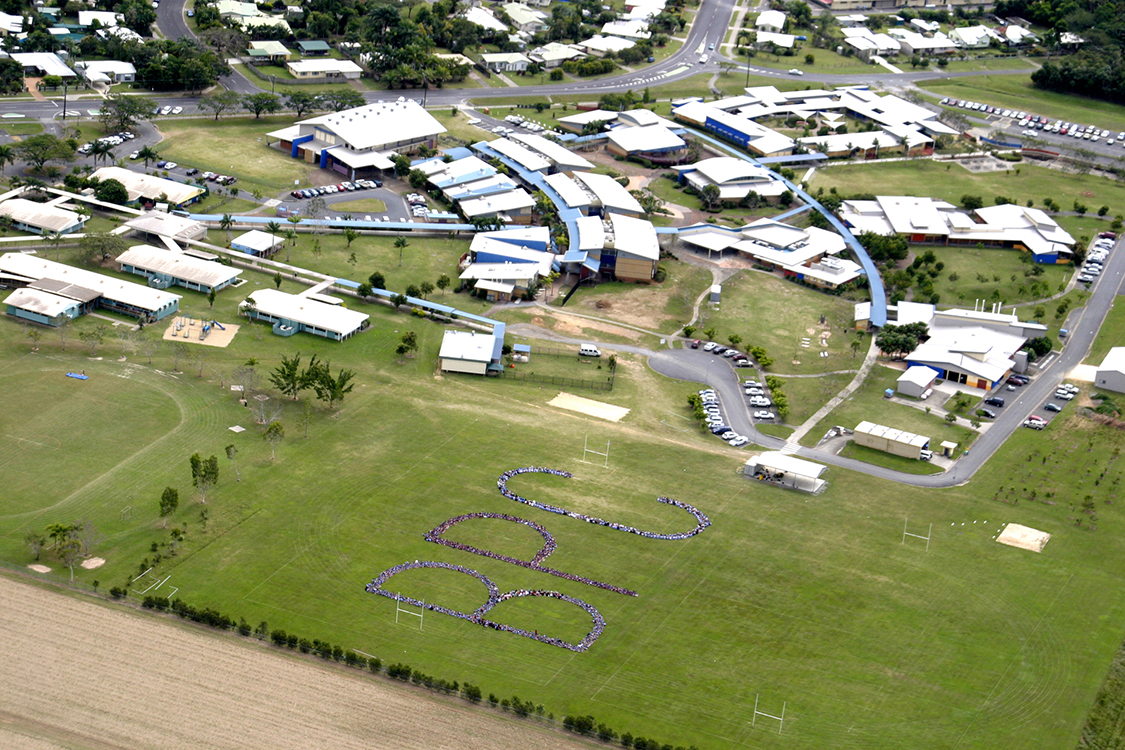
- Student and students forming "BPC" on the Bentley Park College campus oval in 2007, celebrating the school's 10-year anniversary.

Location
- McLaughlin Road; Bentley Park, Cairns, Queensland, 4869; Australia; 17°0′33″S 145°44′29″E

Information
- Type: State primary/secondary day school
- Motto: Aspire, Learn, Achieve
- Religious affiliation: Non-denominational / Catholic
- Established: 1997
- Authority: Department of Education (Queensland)
- Principal: Bruce Houghton (On leave); Kylie Cochran (Acting Principal for Semester 1, 2015)
- Deputy Principals: Paul Andrews (Special Education); Carcice Fehlberg (Australian Curriculum); Jamie Finger (Primary Teaching and Learning); Emma Taylor (Primary Student Services); Sara Janke (Junior Secondary Teaching and Learning); Tash Toohey (Junior Secondary Student Services); Brent Cibau (Senior Secondary Teaching and Learning); Jarrod Prakett (Senior Secondary Student Services)
- Year levels: Prep Year – Year 12
- Gender: Coeducational
- Enrolment: 1,771 (August 2025)
- Website: bentleyparkcollege.eq.edu.au

Bentley Park College is a co-educational, state run school located in Bentley Park, Cairns, Queensland, Australia.

== Historical Development ==
The road the school is located on was built in 1885 and was named after the McLaughlin family, farmers of the area.

In 1997 (term 4), the school opened as a primary school in Centenary Park called "Edmonton State School", after a nearby town. In 1998, it was renamed "Bentley Park College" with commencement in operation as a P–7 school, a corresponding name change which was subsequently reflected in the suburb of "Centenary Park", which was renamed "Bentley Park". In 1999 it was decided to expand it to incorporate secondary schools, with the middle school opening in 2001 and the first Year 12 students graduating in 2004. The school currently educates students from preschool to 12th grade.

In 2011, the school's original motto, "Achieving Tomorrow's Visions Today" was replaced with its current motto of "Aspire, Learn, Achieve".

== Infrastructure ==
=== Medical Precinct ===
In 2022, Bentley Park College launched a $1.4m medical precinct, allowing High school students throughout Cairns to fast track their career in health care.

=== Sports ===
On 25 February 2019, Bentley Park College launched a $1.65 million sport hall upgrade, funded under the Queensland Government's $200 million Advancing Schools initiative, an external covered multi-purpose court, new louvre systems, covered entrances, and a new kinesiology laboratory, with space for a full class of students, laptops and a fully equipped gym.

== Students ==
=== Bentley Original ===
A "Bentley Original" is a term coined for a student who attended Bentley Park College from Preschool, Prep Year or Year 1 until their Year 12 Graduation. The terms was coined by a group of Year 11 Bentley Park College students in 2010 ("2012 Bentley Originals"), a year after the graduation of the initial students who met the "Bentley Originals" requirement, i.e. those beginning Preschool in 1998, or Year 1 in 1999, and graduating in 2009.

=== Years ===
The school first opened its doors to preschool age students in 1997. In 1998, it commenced operation as a P-7 school.

On 17 September 2001, Middle School specialist and general learning classrooms, Middle and Senior School Library, College Administration building and Middle and Senior School Canteen were officially opened. In 2001, The school began accepting middle school students (grades 6–9). In 2002, senior school students (grades 10–12). In 2003–2004, senior school students moved into their own building apart from the middle school students. The first cohort of Year 12s graduated in 2004.

In 2011, the middle school was removed paving the way for Year 7 to transition into high school ahead of other schools in the area, with the former 'Junior School' (Years P-5), 'Middle School' (Years 6–9) and 'Senior School' (Years 10–12) being merged into two sectors: P-6 and 7-12

In 2015, Anna Bligh's state-wide "Flying Start" program was officially implemented to align Queensland with the other states by transferring Year 7 into the high school system, As a result, Bentley Park College moved its Year 7 into the high school domain in 2015.

This produced the school in its current form, teaching the initial Prep Year to final Year 12 (P–12).

=== Student enrolments ===
In 2023, Bentley Park College was reported to have a maximum student enrolment capacity of 2,270 students. The 2023, limit on students entering the Prep in any given year was 150 students in 6 classrooms, which was only to be exceeded if there were more than 150 students enrolling from within the catchment area.

In 2005, there were approximately 1800 students enrolled in the school, 400 of which were senior school students. The trend in school enrolments (August figures) has been:-

Student enrolment trends
Year	Year levels													Gender		Total	Ref
Year	Prep	1	2	3	4	5	6	7	8	9	10	11	12	Boys	Girls	Total	Ref
2009	-	-	-	-	-	-	-	-	-	-	-	-	-	902	782	1,684	
2010	-	-	-	-	-	-	-	-	-	-	-	-	-	899	782	1,681	
2011	-	-	-	-	-	-	-	-	-	-	-	-	-	886	769	1,655	
2012	-	-	-	-	-	-	-	-	-	-	-	-	-	824	744	1,568	
2013	-	-	-	-	-	-	-	-	-	-	-	-	-	811	705	1,516	
2014	-	-	-	-	-	-	-	-	-	-	-	-	-	775	655	1,430	
2015	-	-	-	-	-	-	-	-	-	-	-	-	-	798	680	1,478	
2016	-	-	-	-	-	-	-	-	-	-	-	-	-	779	671	1,450	
2017	-	-	-	-	-	-	-	-	-	-	-	-	-	814	722	1,536	
2018	-	-	-	-	-	-	-	-	-	-	-	-	-	805	727	1,532	
2019	-	-	-	-	-	-	-	-	-	-	-	-	-	811	736	1,547	
2020	71	64	72	86	97	114	88	206	202	204	172	149	106	873	758	1,631	
2021	81	76	71	75	86	106	113	201	195	205	200	140	120	887	782	1,669	
2022	75	77	84	79	71	96	111	222	194	190	210	154	97	888	772	1,660	
2023	74	81	72	78	83	84	106	250	232	200	188	156	130	925	809	1,734	
2024	70	71	80	77	80	97	88	251	244	220	195	147	103	922	801	1,723	
2025	TBA	TBA	TBA	TBA	TBA	TBA	TBA	TBA	TBA	TBA	TBA	TBA	TBA	935	836	1,771	
2026	TBA	TBA	TBA	TBA	TBA	TBA	TBA	TBA	TBA	TBA	TBA	TBA	TBA	TBA	TBA	TBA	

== Cultural Diversity ==
=== Traditional Land ===
The school is located on Gimuy Walubarra Yidinji people's traditional Country.

=== Multiculturalism ===
The recent trends in multicultural composition been:

Student enrolment trends
Year	Indigenous	LBOTE	Ref
2014	29	29	
2015	31	32	
2016	30	32	
2017	33	35	
2018	35	36	
2019	37	37	
2020	38	39	
2021	38	39	
2022	40	41	
2023	41	42	
2024	41	41	
2025	TBA	TBA	

== Sports ==
=== Houses ===
The school's four sports houses are named after local reefs, each with its own sea creature mascot:

Sports Houses
House Name	Reef	Colour	Mascot	Ref
Arlington	Arlington Reef	Blue	Marlins	
Euston	Euston Reef	Yellow	Tiger Sharks	
Onyx	Onyx Reef	Red	Octopuses	
Upolu	Upolu Reef	Green	Crocodiles	

== Notable alumni ==
The following are notable alumni of the school:

Notable alumni in sport
Name	Graduation Year	Sport	Achievements	Ref
Chris Wright	2018	Swimmer	Competed for Australia at the 2012 London Olympic Games, the 2010 Delhi Commonwealth Games and 2014 Glasgow Commonwealth Games and four World Championships. In 2009, Chris broke the Australian record for the men's short course 200m Butterfly.	

== See also ==
- Education in Queensland
- History of state education in Queensland
- List of schools in North Queensland
- List of schools in Queensland
- Lists of schools in Australia
