= Cairns =

Cairns Gimuy (Yidiny)
- City
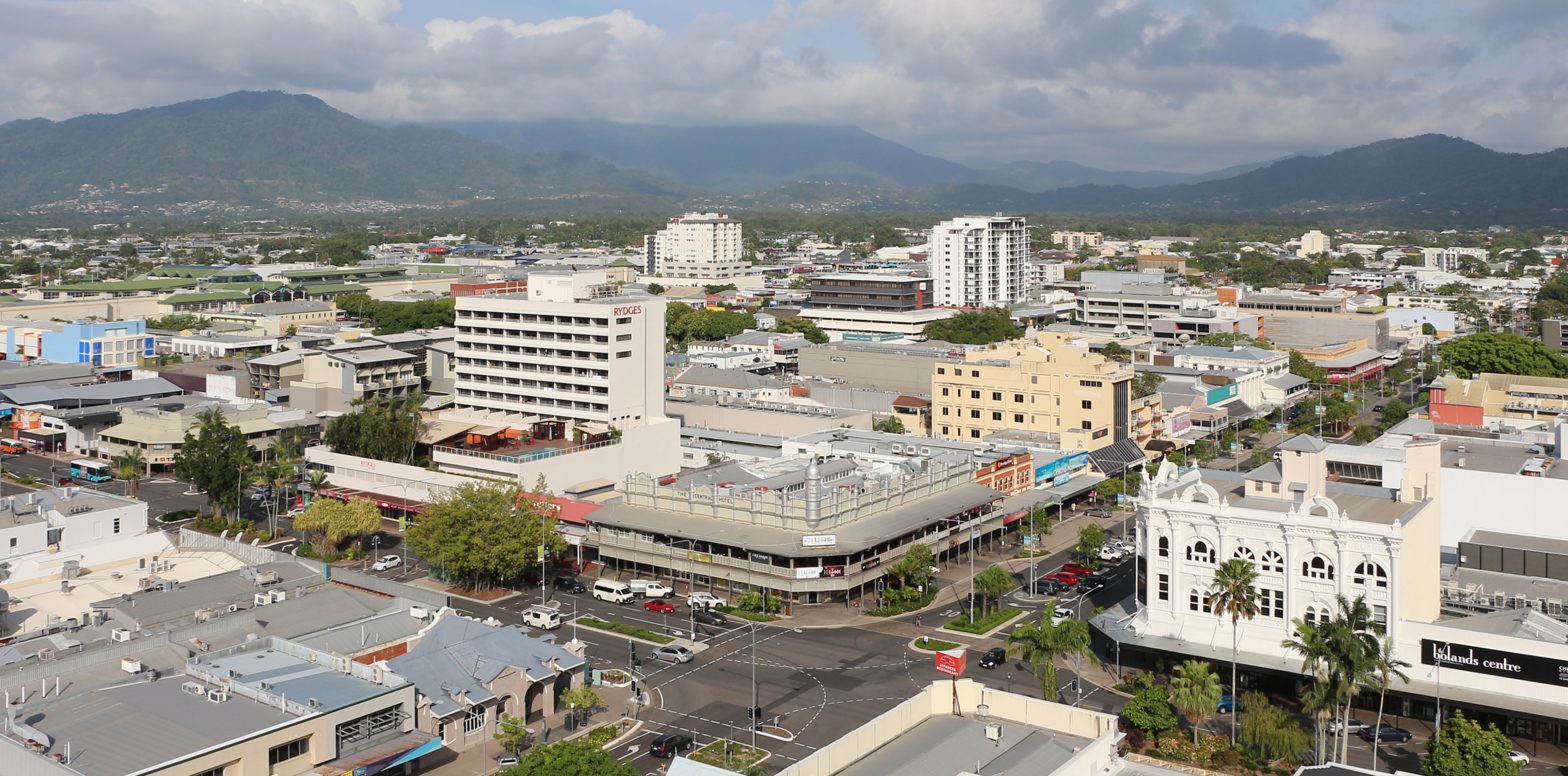
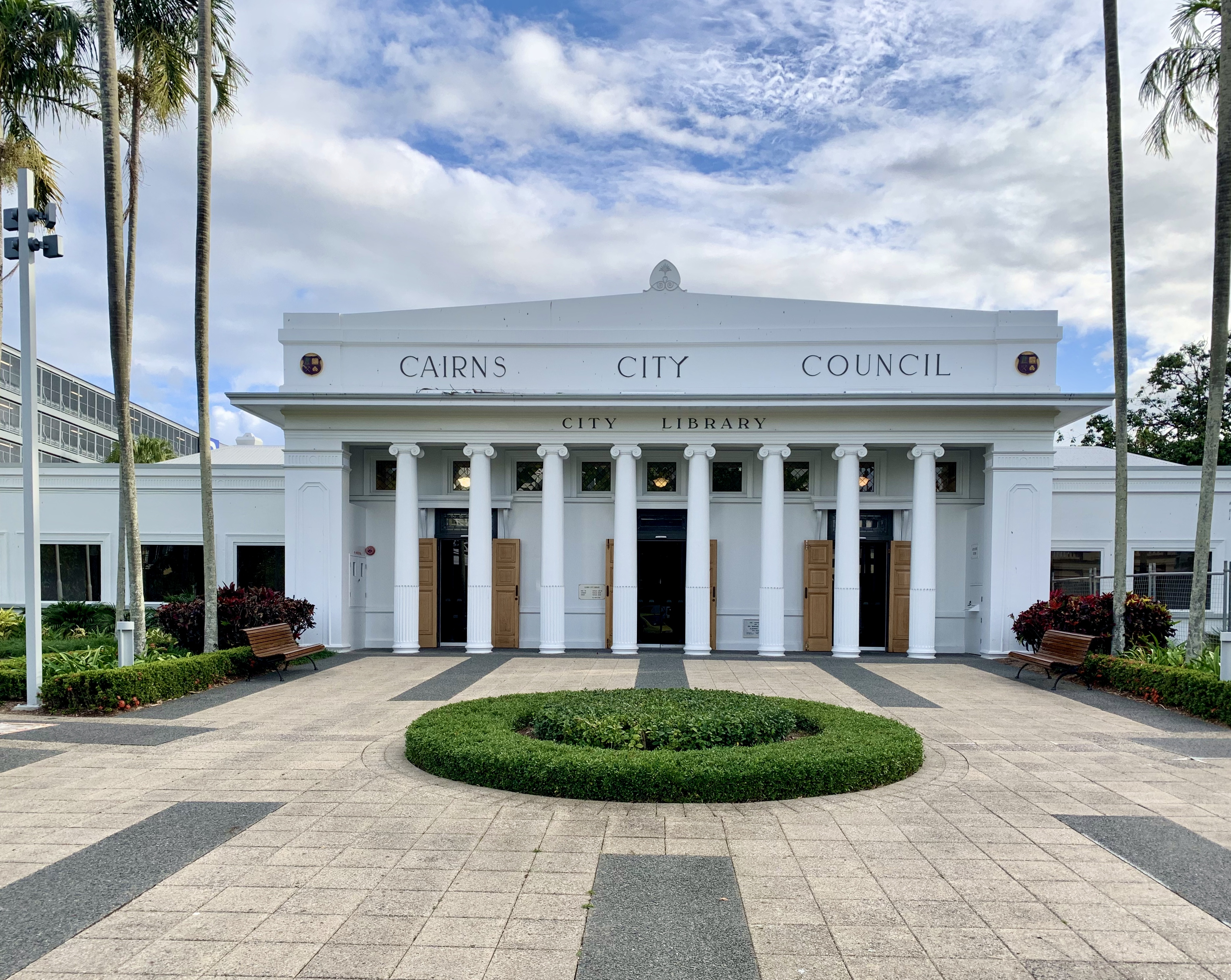
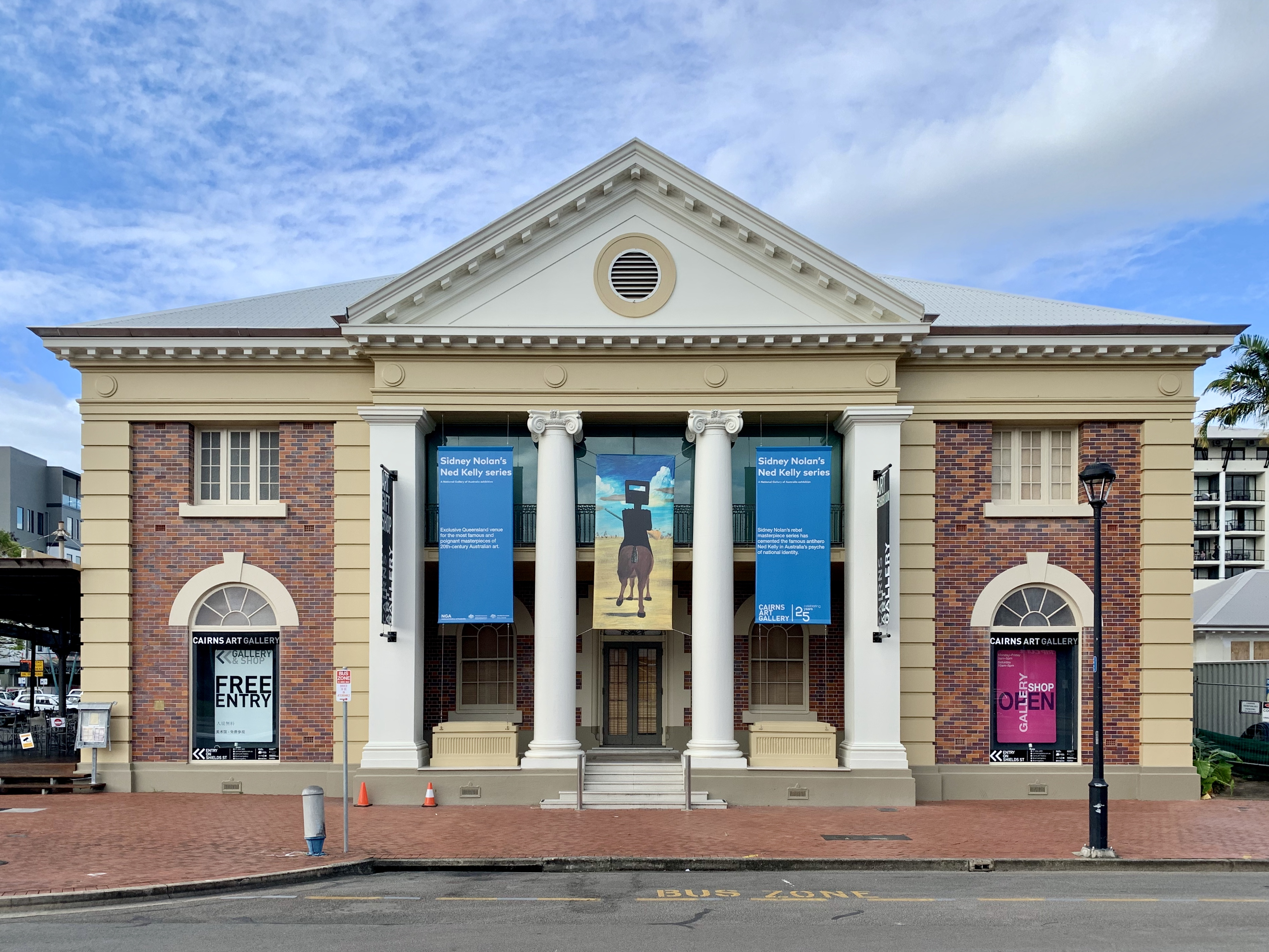
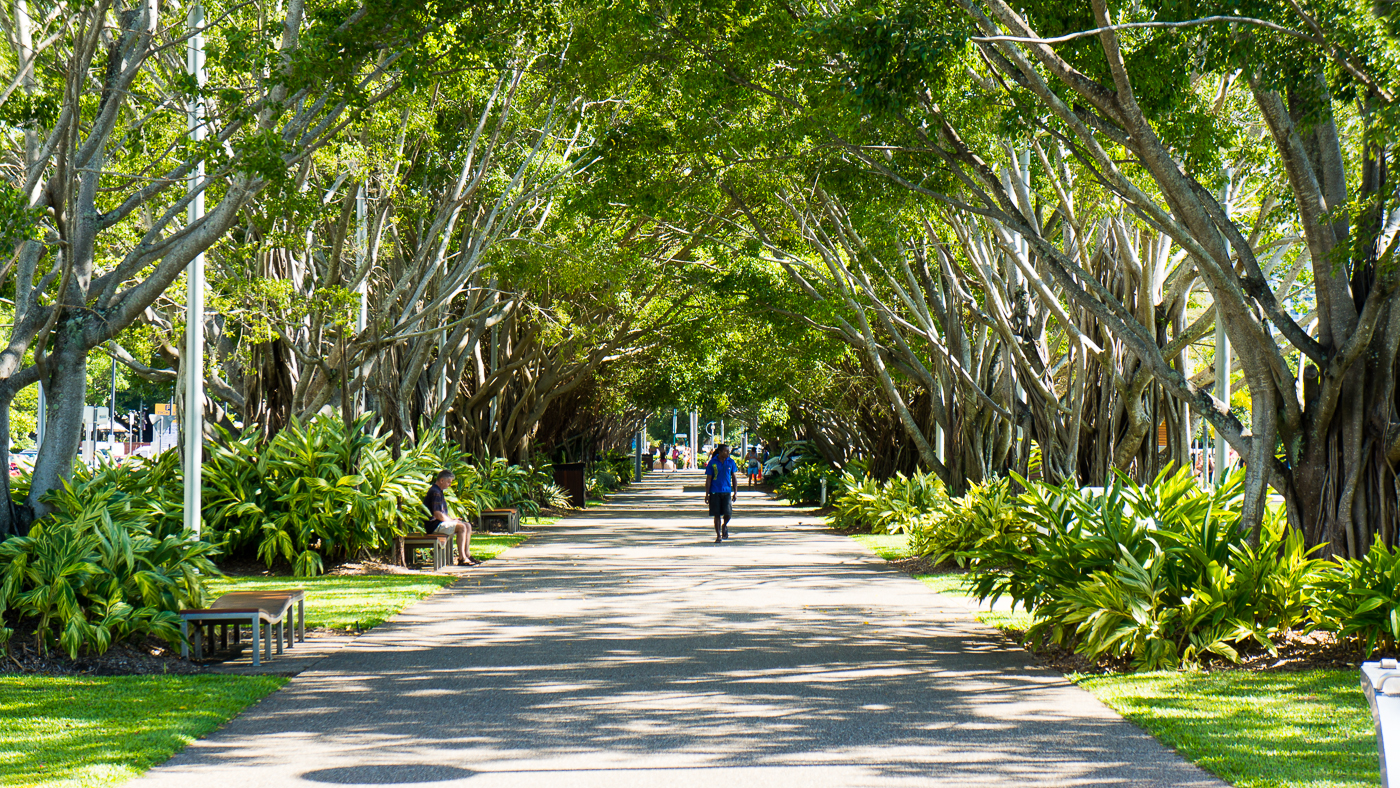
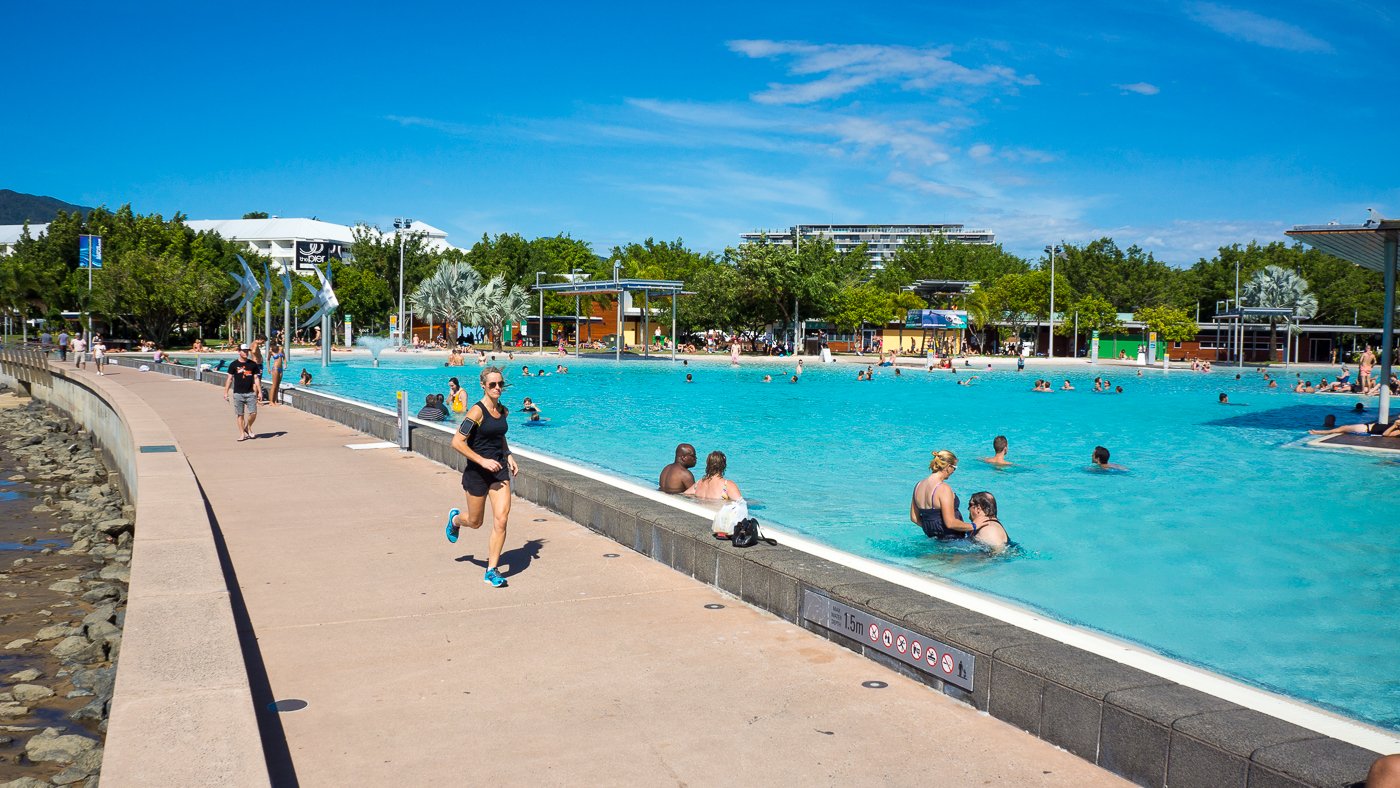
- Cairns CBD Cairns City Library Cairns Regional Gallery Esplanade Cairns Marina and Lagoon

- Coordinates: 16.92°S 145.78°E
- Country: Australia
- State: Queensland
- LGA: Cairns Region
- Location: 68 km (42 mi) SSE of Port Douglas; 347 km (216 mi) NNW of Townsville; 1,064 km (661 mi) NW of Rockhampton; 1,695 km (1,053 mi) NNW of Brisbane
- Established: 1876

Government
  - State electorates: Cairns; Barron River; Mulgrave
  - Federal divisions: Leichhardt; Kennedy

Area
  - Total: 254.3 km^{2} (98.2 sq mi)
- Elevation: 7 m (23 ft)

Population
  - Total: 169,312 (2021) (15th)
  - Density: 665.80/km^{2} (1,724.4/sq mi)
- Time zone: UTC+10:00 (AEST)
- Postcode: 4870
- County: Nares
- Mean max temp: 29.4 °C (84.9 °F)
- Mean min temp: 21.0 °C (69.8 °F)
- Annual rainfall: 1,981.5 mm (78.01 in)

Cairns (English: /kænz/ KANZ; Yidiny: Gimuy) is a city in the Cairns Region, Queensland, Australia, on the tropical northeast coast of Far North Queensland. In the 2021 census, Cairns had a population of 169,312.

The city was founded in 1876 and named after Sir William Wellington Cairns, following the discovery of gold in the Hodgkinson River. During World War II, the city became a staging ground for the Allied Forces in the Battle of the Coral Sea. By the late 20th century the city had become a centre of international tourism. In the early 21st century, it has developed into a major regional city.

The economy of Cairns is based primarily on tourism, healthcare and education, along with a major capacity in aviation, marine and defence industries. As of 2024, the city had a gross regional product of about $12.2 billion. The city is served by Cairns International Airport, the seventh-busiest airport in Australia. Cairns also has a major cruise ship industry servicing both domestic and international markets, with terminals at Cairns Seaport and Cairns Wharf Complex.

Cairns is a major tourist destination, with access to two UNESCO world heritage sites: the Daintree Rainforest as part of the Wet Tropics of Queensland, and the Great Barrier Reef, one of the seven natural wonders of the world.

== History ==
Prior to British settlement, the Cairns area was inhabited by the Gimuy Walubara Yidinji people, who still claim their native title rights. Yidinji (also known as Yidinj, Yidiny, and Idindji) is an Australian Aboriginal language. Its traditional language region is within the local government areas of Cairns Region and Tablelands Region, in such localities as Cairns, Gordonvale, and the Mulgrave River, and the southern part of the Atherton Tableland including Atherton and Kairi. The area in which the city is located is known in the local Yidiny language as Gimuy, and the clan who inhabited the region before colonisation are the Gimuy-walubarra clan.

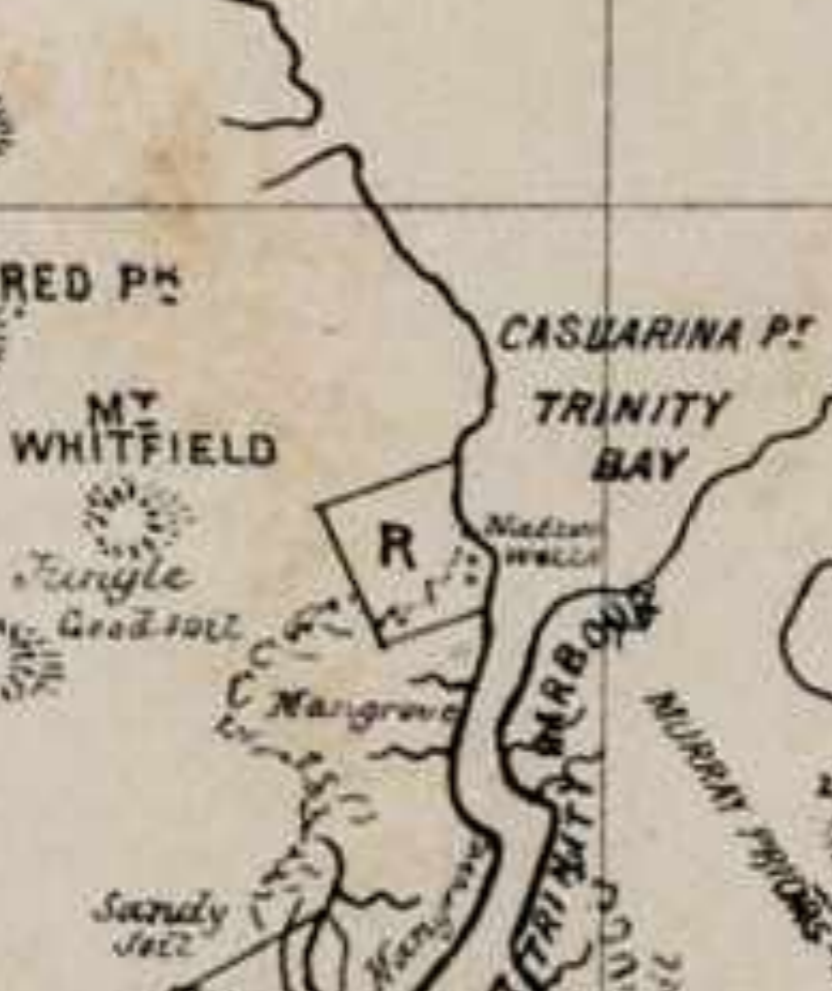
1874 map showing native wells situated within the future site of Cairns

From 1770 to the early 1870s, the area was known to the British simply as Trinity Bay. The arrival of beche de mer fishermen from the late 1860s saw the first European presence in the area. On the site of the modern-day Cairns foreshore, there was a large native well which was used by these fishermen. A violent confrontation occurred in 1872 between local Yidinji people and Phillip Garland, a beche de mer fisherman, over the use of this well. The area from this date was subsequently called Battle Camp.

In 1876, hastened by the need to export gold mined from the Hodgkinson goldfields on the tablelands to the west, closer investigation by several official expeditions established its potential for development into a port. Brinsley G. Sheridan surveyed the area and selected a place further up Trinity Inlet known to the diggers as Smith's Landing, for a settlement which he renamed Thornton. However, after Native Police officers Alexander Douglas-Douglas and Robert Arthur Johnstone opened a new track from the goldfields to Battle Camp, this more coastal site became preferable. The area was named Cairns in late 1876 in honour of the then Governor of Queensland, William Cairns. The site was predominantly mangrove swamps and sand ridges. Labourers gradually cleared the swamps, and the sand ridges were filled with dried mud, sawdust from local sawmills, and ballast from a quarry at Edge Hill.

Throughout the late 19th century, Cairns prospered from the settlement of Chinese immigrants who helped develop the region's agriculture. Soon after Cairns was established "a few entrepreneurial Chinese men began to experiment with crops such as cotton, tobacco, coffee, rice, sugar, and bananas, while market gardeners grew much needed fruit and vegetables. This marked the beginning of the agricultural industry, which became the dominant industry." "The growing agricultural industry in the Cairns region provided the impetus for Cairns Chinatown to develop as Chinese men turned to support industries such as market gardening and shop keeping. They were not only ex-miners, but a growing number of immigrants arriving directly from China to take advantage of the agricultural boom. In 1886 the Chinese population accounted for 60% of all farmers and 90% of gardeners, that is 795 cultivators and gardeners."

As agricultural changes and the White Australia policy impacted the Chinese population of Cairns, including its once thriving Chinatown declined. A Police census stated the Chinese population of Cairns was 450 in 1909, a decrease of around 1,000 since 1901. "Grafton Street, Cairns was the historical site for Cairns Chinatown – the largest and longest running Chinese community outside Brisbane from the 1880s until the mid 1940s. Supporting a diverse population of Chinese settlers, entrepreneurs, women and families, ..." "From the early 1880s when the Lily Creek Chinese camp moved into Sachs Street, Chinatown was a busy and thriving community. According to Cathie May, the social structure of the community was divided according to place of origin with storekeepers on the eastern side of Sachs Street predominantly Sze Yap, and Chung Shan storekeepers and merchants on the western side. Nearly all Chinese immigrants to Cairns were from Guangdong Province in the Southern Delta area of China. Most came from Loong Dou, a small distinct district in Chung Shan, with a smaller group from Sze Yap or the "Four Districts" in Toishan. Some also came from Sam Yap or "Three Districts." " As the 20th century progressed the Cairns Chinatown declined. "Australian Born Chinese showed little interest in maintaining the Chinese enclave. Many were westernised having at least one European parent or grandparent, or had themselves grown up assimilated into the broader Cairns community through their experiences at school. Neither cultural tastes, nor race relations, provided an incentive for Australian born Chinese to remain living in Chinatown. The barriers causing racial residential segregation were removed and many families lived outside Chinatown."

The Cairns Parish of the Roman Catholic Vicariate Apostolic of Cooktown (now the Roman Catholic Diocese of Cairns) was established in 1884.

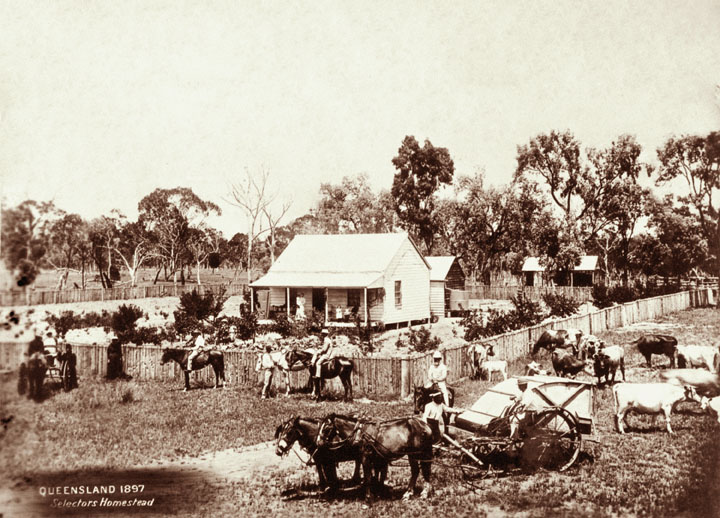
Farm in Cairns in 1897

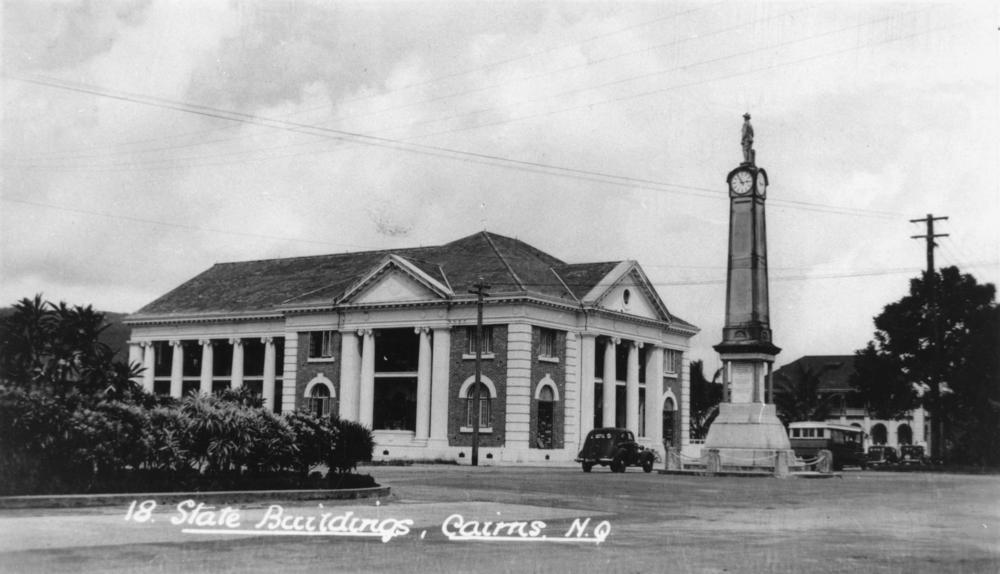
Cairns War Memorial, c. 1936

Debris from the construction of a railway to Herberton on the Atherton Tableland, a project which started in 1886, was also used. The railway opened up land later used for agriculture on the lowlands (sugar cane, corn, rice, bananas, pineapples), and for fruit and dairy production on the Tableland. The success of local agriculture helped establish Cairns as a port, and the creation of a harbour board in 1906 supported its robust economic future.

The Wharf Estate Cairns went on sale in Brisbane via auction on 19 February 1889 by John Macnamara & Co. Land Auctioneers. The land was part of the place known as the Railway Reserve. The sale was described by the Auctioneers as the 'largest ever yet held in Northern Queensland'.

On 25 April 1926 (ANZAC Day), the Cairns Sailors and Soldiers War Memorial was unveiled by Alexander Frederick Draper, the mayor of the City of Cairns.

During World War II, the Allied Forces used Cairns as a staging base for operations in the Pacific, with United States Army Air Forces and Royal Australian Air Force operational bases (now the airport), as well as a major military seaplane base, Naval Base Cairns, in Trinity Inlet, and United States Navy and Royal Australian Navy bases near the current wharf. Combat missions were flown out of Cairns in support of the Battle of the Coral Sea in 1942. Edmonton and White Rock south of Cairns were major military supply areas and U.S. Paratroopers trained at Gordonvale and the Goldsborough Valley. A Special Forces training base was established at the old "Fairview" homestead on Munro's Hill, Mooroobool. This base was officially known as the Z Experimental Station, but referred to informally as "The House on the Hill".

After World War II, Cairns gradually developed into a centre for tourism. The opening of the Cairns International Airport in 1984 helped establish the city as a desirable destination for international tourism particularly from the emerging Japanese market.

== Demographics ==
In the 2016 census, the urban area of Cairns had a population of 144,730.

In the 2021 census, the urban area of Cairns had a population of 153,181.

- Aboriginal and Torres Strait Islander people made up 9.7% of the population.
- 68.2% of people were born in Australia. The next most common countries of birth were England 4.0%, New Zealand 2.9%, Papua New Guinea 1.5%, Philippines 1.3% and India 1.2%.
- 76.1% of people only spoke English at home. Other languages spoken at home included Japanese 1.5%, Nepali 0.7%, Mandarin 0.7%, Punjabi 0.6%, and Creole languages 0.6%.
- The most common responses for religion were no religion 41.9%, Catholic 19.7%, not stated 10.1%, Anglican 9.8%, other Christian 2.8%.

Due to Far North Queensland's close proximity to Melanesia, the region has a large number of people of Melanesian origin. Cairns notably has a large Papua New Guineans community. Approximately 10,000 Papua New Guineans live in Cairns, more than anywhere outside of Papua New Guinea itself.

== Geography ==
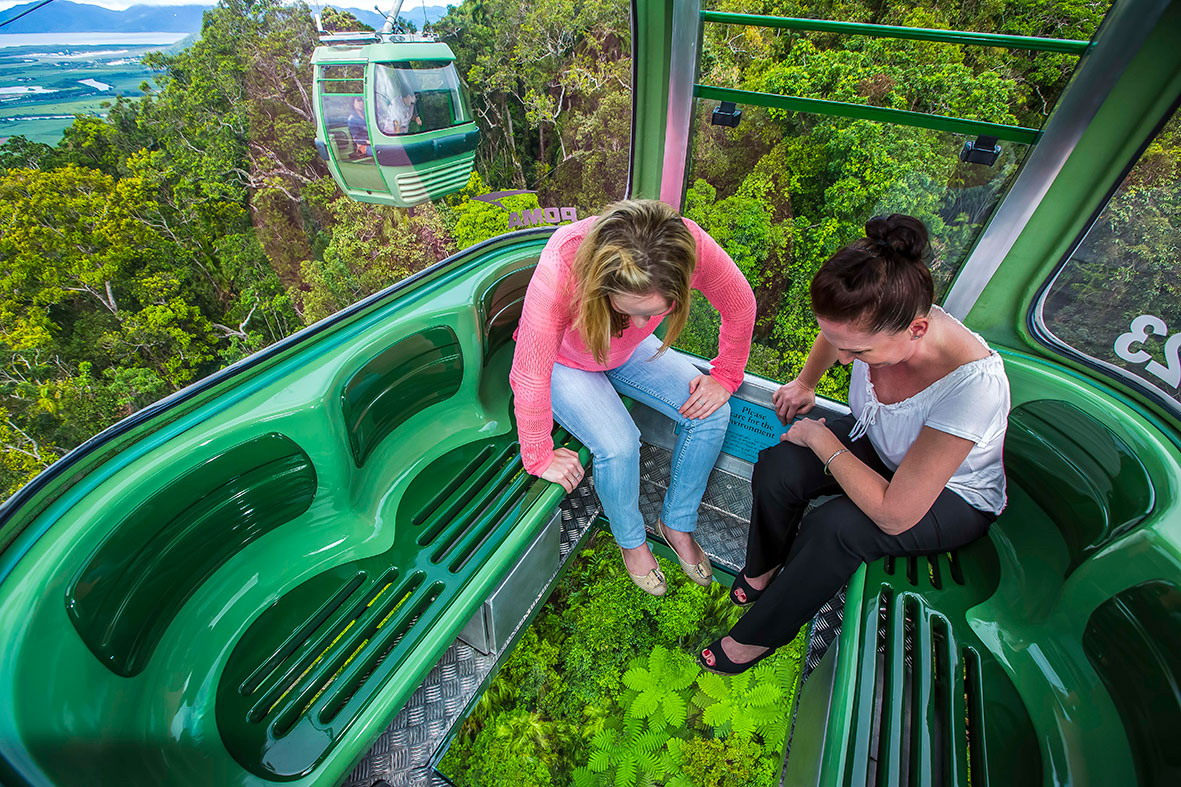
The Skyrail Rainforest Cableway goes over the rainforest and is one of the city's main tourist attractions.

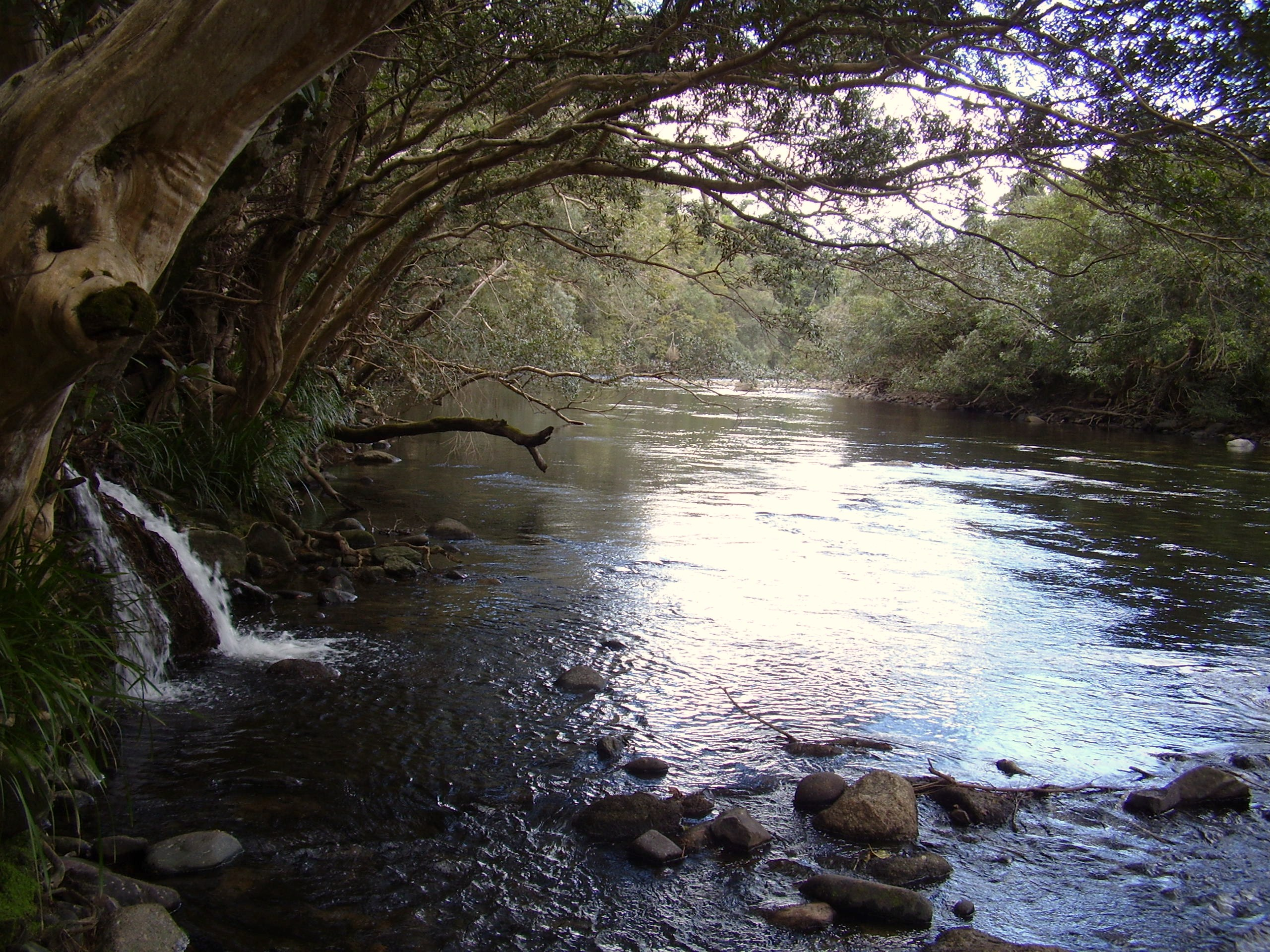
The Mulgrave River running through the Goldsbrough Valley to the south of Gordonvale

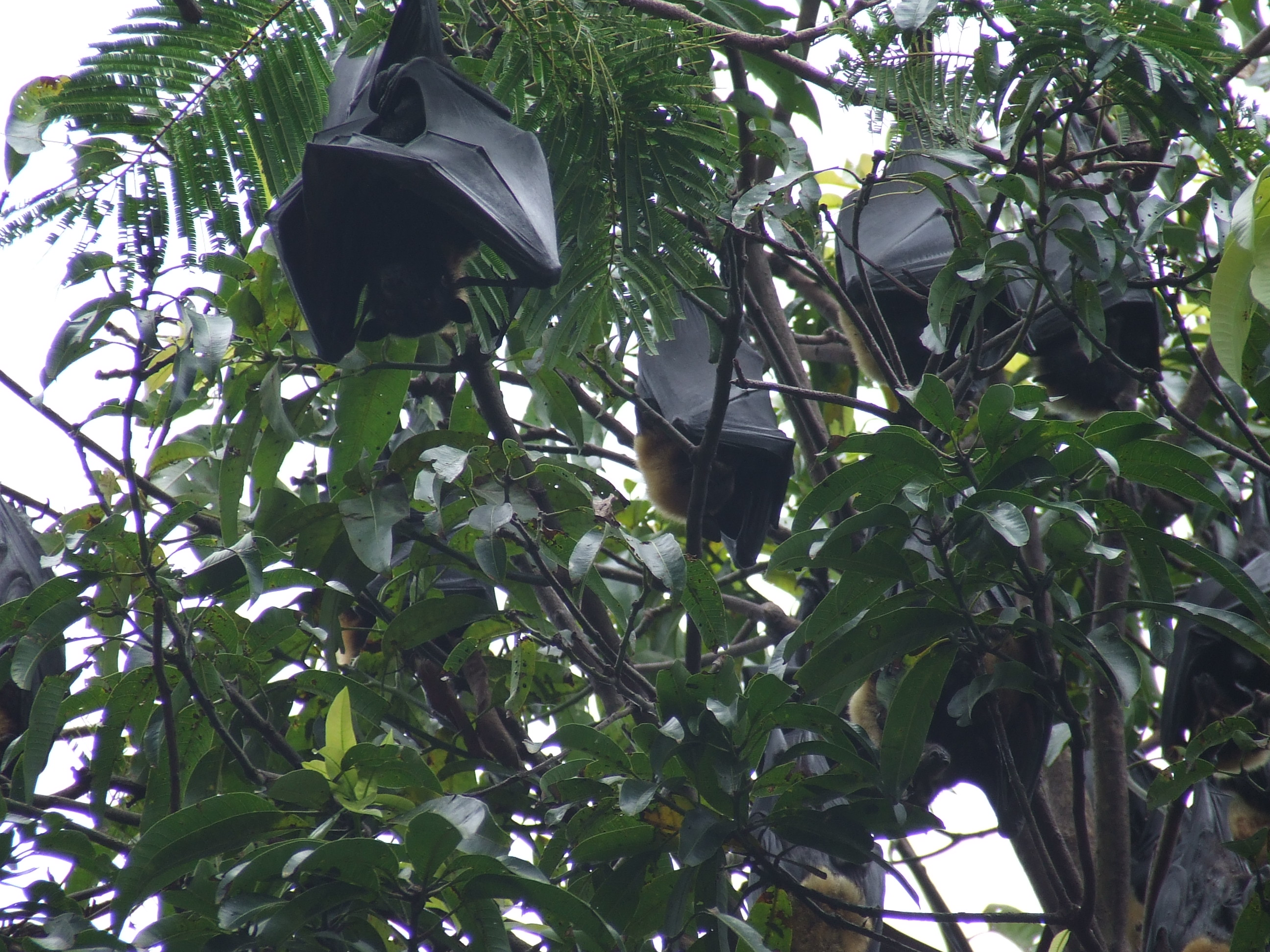
Fruit bats hanging from a mango tree, central Cairns

Cairns is located on the east coast of Cape York Peninsula on a coastal strip between the Coral Sea and the Great Dividing Range. The northern part of the city is located on Trinity Bay and the city centre is located on Trinity Inlet. To the south of the Trinity Inlet lies the Aboriginal community of Yarrabah. Some of the city's suburbs are located on flood plains. The Mulgrave River and Barron River flow within the greater Cairns area but not through the Cairns CBD. The city's centre foreshore is located on a mud flat.

=== Urban layout ===
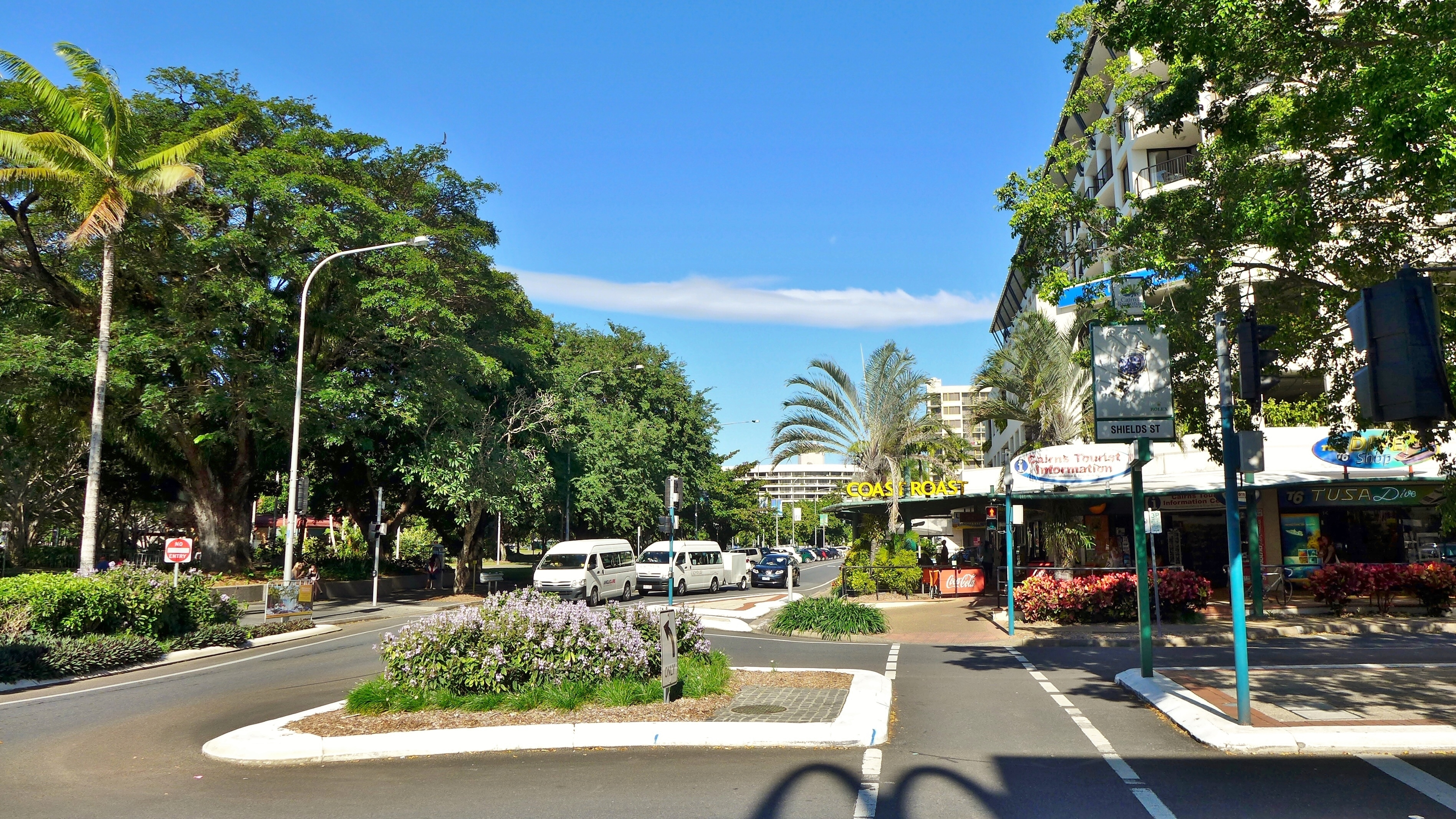
City centre of Cairns

Cairns is a provincial city, with a linear urban layout that runs from the south at Edmonton to the north at Ellis Beach. The city is approximately 52 km (32 mi) from north to south; it has experienced a recent urban sprawl, with suburbs occupying land once used for sugar cane farming.

The Northern Beaches consist of a number of beach communities extending north along the coast. In general, each beach suburb is at the end of a spur road extending from the Captain Cook Highway. From south to north, these are Machans Beach, Holloways Beach, Yorkeys Knob, Trinity Park, Trinity Beach, Kewarra Beach, Clifton Beach, Palm Cove, and Ellis Beach.

The suburb of Smithfield is inland against the mountains of the Great Dividing Range, between Yorkeys Knob and Trinity Park. It serves as the main hub for the Northern Beaches, with a modern shopping arcade, called Smithfield Shopping Centre.

South of Smithfield and inland from the Northern Beaches along the edge of the Barron River flood plain are the suburbs of Caravonica, Kamerunga, Freshwater, and Stratford. This area is sometimes referred to as Freshwater Valley, though it is actually the lower part of Redlynch Valley; further up the valley are the suburbs of Redlynch, on the western side of Redlynch Valley, and Brinsmead on the eastern side. Stratford, Freshwater, and Brinsmead are separated from Cairns city by Mount Whitfield (elevation 365 m (1,198 ft)) and Whitfield Range. Crystal Cascades and Copperlode Falls Dam are also behind this range. (Kuranda, a town on the Barron River on the western side of the Macalister Range, forms part of the Cairns economic catchment but is in the Tablelands local government area and is not part of the Cairns urban area.)

The city centre of Cairns is adjacent to the suburbs of Cairns North, and Parramatta Park, Bungalow, Portsmith, and close to Westcourt, Manunda, Manoora, Edge Hill, Whitfield, Kanimbla, City View, Mooroobool, Earlville, Woree and Bayview Heights. The small suburb of Aeroglen is pressed between Mount Whitfield and the airport, on the Captain Cook Highway between Cairns North and Stratford.

Southside Cairns, situated in a narrow area between Trinity Inlet to the east and Lamb Range to the west, includes the suburbs of White Rock, Mount Sheridan, Bentley Park and Edmonton. The townships of Goldsborough, Little Mulgrave, and Aloomba are near Gordonvale, on the Mulgrave River. This area is serviced by the Bruce Highway. Several other small towns and communities within Cairns's jurisdiction are sparsely located along the Bruce Highway, the furthest being Bramston Beach, 81 km (50 mi) south of the Cairns CBD; the largest of these townships is Babinda, about 60 km (37 mi) from the city.

=== Climate ===
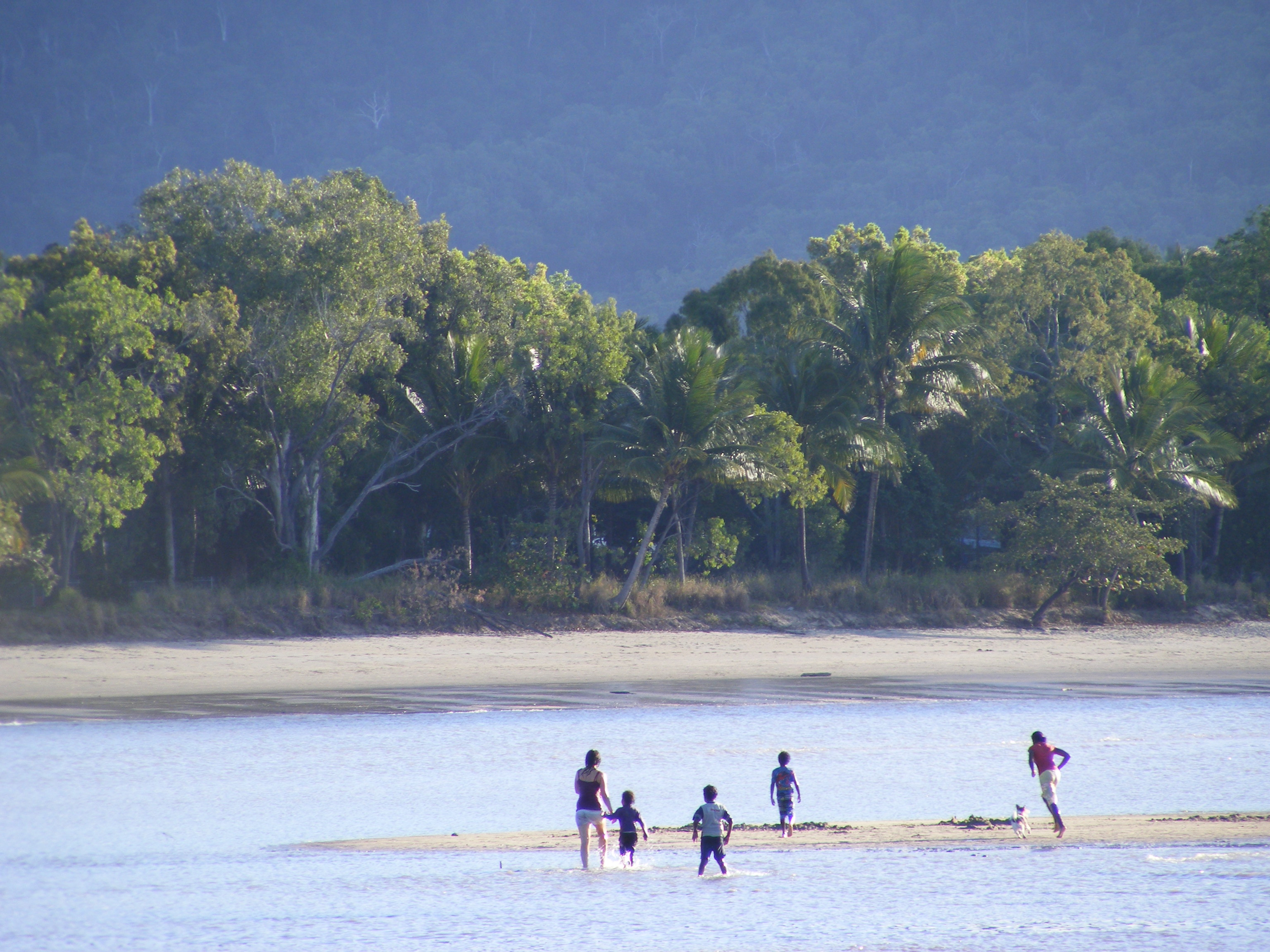
Tropical beach near Cairns

Cairns experiences a tropical climate, specifically a tropical monsoon (Am) under the Köppen climate classification. A wet season with heavy monsoonal downpours runs from November to May, with a relatively dry season from June to October, though light showers occur during this period. Cairns's mean annual rainfall is just under 2,000 millimetres (79 in), although monthly totals in the wet season from December to April can exceed 1,000 mm (39 in), with the highest monthly rainfall being recorded in January 1981, when over 1,417.4 mm (55.80 in) of rain fell. In contrast, as little as 721 millimetres or 28.39 inches fell in the record dry calendar year of 2002.

Cairns has hot, humid summers and very warm winters. Mean maximum temperatures vary from 26.2 °C (79.2 °F) in July to 31.7 °C (89.1 °F) in January. Monsoonal activity during the wet season occasionally causes major flooding of the Barron and Mulgrave Rivers, cutting off-road and rail access to the city. Cairns has 97.0 clear days, annually. Dewpoint in the wet season (summer) averages at 23 °C (73 °F). The average temperature of the sea ranges from 23.8 °C (74.8 °F) in July to 29.4 °C (84.9 °F) in January.

Climate data for Cairns (16º52'12"S, 145º45'00"E, 2 m AMSL) (1991–2020 normals, extremes 1942–present)
Month	Jan	Feb	Mar	Apr	May	Jun	Jul	Aug	Sep	Oct	Nov	Dec	Year
Record high °C (°F)	40.4 (104.7)	40.0 (104.0)	37.7 (99.9)	36.8 (98.2)	31.3 (88.3)	30.8 (87.4)	30.1 (86.2)	31.4 (88.5)	33.9 (93.0)	36.0 (96.8)	42.6 (108.7)	40.5 (104.9)	42.6 (108.7)
Mean maximum °C (°F)	35.2 (95.4)	35.1 (95.2)	33.6 (92.5)	31.7 (89.1)	30.2 (86.4)	28.9 (84.0)	28.6 (83.5)	29.3 (84.7)	31.2 (88.2)	32.4 (90.3)	33.9 (93.0)	35.0 (95.0)	37.0 (98.6)
Mean daily maximum °C (°F)	31.7 (89.1)	31.5 (88.7)	30.9 (87.6)	29.6 (85.3)	28.0 (82.4)	26.6 (79.9)	26.2 (79.2)	27.0 (80.6)	28.7 (83.7)	29.9 (85.8)	31.1 (88.0)	31.8 (89.2)	29.4 (85.0)
Daily mean °C (°F)	27.9 (82.2)	27.8 (82.0)	27.2 (81.0)	25.8 (78.4)	24.1 (75.4)	22.6 (72.7)	21.7 (71.1)	22.2 (72.0)	23.8 (74.8)	25.4 (77.7)	26.8 (80.2)	27.8 (82.0)	25.3 (77.5)
Mean daily minimum °C (°F)	24.0 (75.2)	24.1 (75.4)	23.4 (74.1)	22.0 (71.6)	20.1 (68.2)	18.5 (65.3)	17.2 (63.0)	17.3 (63.1)	18.8 (65.8)	20.8 (69.4)	22.5 (72.5)	23.7 (74.7)	21.0 (69.9)
Mean minimum °C (°F)	21.4 (70.5)	22.0 (71.6)	20.3 (68.5)	18.7 (65.7)	15.7 (60.3)	13.2 (55.8)	11.7 (53.1)	11.6 (52.9)	14.5 (58.1)	17.1 (62.8)	19.1 (66.4)	20.7 (69.3)	10.5 (50.9)
Record low °C (°F)	18.2 (64.8)	17.9 (64.2)	17.7 (63.9)	13.0 (55.4)	10.1 (50.2)	6.2 (43.2)	7.3 (45.1)	7.8 (46.0)	9.3 (48.7)	12.4 (54.3)	14.6 (58.3)	17.1 (62.8)	6.2 (43.2)
Average precipitation mm (inches)	388.7 (15.30)	475.5 (18.72)	367.4 (14.46)	178.1 (7.01)	81.0 (3.19)	42.6 (1.68)	35.5 (1.40)	26.6 (1.05)	28.4 (1.12)	63.4 (2.50)	85.1 (3.35)	185.9 (7.32)	1,958.1 (77.09)
Average precipitation days (≥ 1.0 mm)	16.0	15.7	15.1	14.4	10.1	7.2	5.7	4.5	4.2	6.2	8.3	10.9	118.3
Average afternoon relative humidity (%)	67	71	66	65	63	61	57	56	55	57	60	64	62
Average dew point °C (°F)	22.9 (73.2)	23.6 (74.5)	21.9 (71.4)	20.4 (68.7)	18.5 (65.3)	16.7 (62.1)	15.1 (59.2)	15.3 (59.5)	16.7 (62.1)	18.5 (65.3)	20.3 (68.5)	21.9 (71.4)	19.3 (66.8)
Mean monthly sunshine hours	213.9	175.2	204.6	210.0	220.1	210.0	232.5	251.1	270.0	279.0	258.0	241.8	2,766.2
Percentage possible sunshine	54	50	55	61	63	63	67	69	74	73	67	60	63
Source: Bureau of Meteorology

==== Tropical cyclones ====
Like most of North and Far North Queensland, Cairns is prone to tropical cyclones, usually forming between November and May.

Cyclones that have affected the Cairns region include:

- Cyclone Jasper, 2023
- Cyclone Yasi, 2011
- Cyclone Larry, 2006
- Cyclone Abigail, 2001
- Cyclone Steve, 2000
- Cyclone Rona, 1999
- Cyclone Justin, 1997

Cyclone Jasper in December 2023 caused record flooding. The Barron River exceeded the March 1977 record of 3.8 metres (12 ft), making it the worst flooding event in Cairns since records began in 1915.

== Facilities ==
The City Library, operated by the Cairns Regional Council, opened in 1979 and is situated at 151 Abbott Street. A major refurbishment was undertaken in 1999 and a further minor refurbishment was implemented in 2011. Publicly accessible Wi-Fi is available. Current library services and collections can be accessed from the Cairns Libraries website.

== Heritage listings ==
Cairns has a number of heritage-listed sites, including:

- Cairns-to-Kuranda railway line
- Abbott Street: Dr EA Koch Memorial
- Abbott Street: Barrier Reef Hotel
- Abbott Street: Bishop's House
- Abbott Street: St Monica's High School Administration Building
- 6A–8A Abbott Street: former Cairns Customs House
- 38–40 Abbott Street: Cairns Court House
- 151 Abbott Street: Cairns City Council Chambers
- 179 Abbott Street: St Joseph's Convent
- 183 Abbott Street: St Monica's War Memorial Cathedral
- Collins Avenue, Edge Hill: Flecker Botanical Gardens
- Collins Avenue, Edge Hill: WWII RAN Fuel Installation
- Grafton Street: Cairns Control Room, World War II Volunteer Defence Corps
- 99 Grafton Street: former Cairns Chinatown
- 28D Grove Street, Parramatta Park: Grove Street Pensioners' Cottages
- Lake Street: Bolands Centre
- 37 Lake Street: former Adelaide Steamship Co Ltd Building
- 39–49 Lake Street: former Central Hotel
- 87 Lake Street: Hides Hotel
- 93–105 Lake Street: former School of Arts
- 399 Kamerunga Road, Redlynch: Xavier and Sadie Herbert's Cottage
- 127–145 McLeod Street, Cairns North: McLeod Street Pioneer Cemetery
- 180 McLeod, Cairns North: Herries Private Hospital
- Minnie Street: St Monica's Old Cathedral
- 8 Minnie Street: Cairns Masonic Temple
- Sheridan Street, Cairns North: Cairns Technical College and High School Building
- The Esplanade: Cairns War Memorial
- 51 The Esplanade: former Mulgrave Shire Council Chambers
- 183–185 The Esplanade, Cairns North: Floriana
- Wharf Street: Cairns Wharf Complex
- 29 Wharf Street: former Jack and Newell Building

== Governance ==
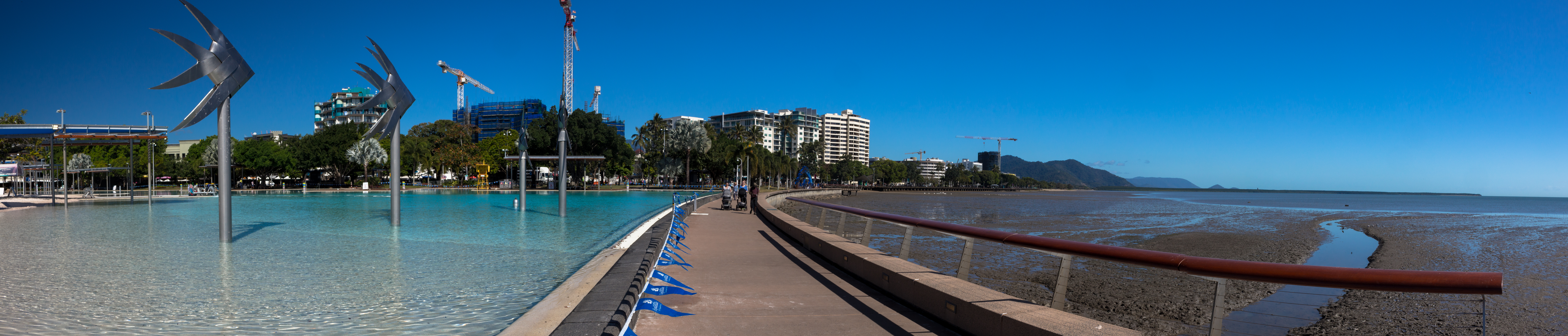
The lagoon on the Cairns Esplanade on the left, separated by the boardwalk from the ocean on the right, at low tide

Cairns is part of the Cairns Region local government area which is governed by a Regional Council. The Council consists of a directly elected mayor and 9 councillors, elected from 9 single-member divisions (or wards) using an optional preferential voting system. Elections are held every four years.

The Cairns Region consists of three former local government areas. The first was the original City of Cairns, consisting of the Cairns City region as listed above. The second, which was amalgamated in 1995, was the Shire of Mulgrave (comprising the other areas, namely the Northern Beaches, Redlynch Valley and Southside). The town of Gordonvale was once called Nelson. The third area is the Shire of Douglas, which amalgamated in 2008 during major statewide local government reforms and then de-amalgamated in 2014.

At the time of the 1995 amalgamation, Cairns City had a population of approximately 40,000 and Mulgrave Shire had a population of approximately 60,000. Both local government authorities had chambers in the Cairns CBD. The old Cairns City Council chambers has been converted into a new city library. In a controversial decision, new Council chambers were constructed on previously contaminated land in the mainly industrial suburb of Portsmith at 119–145 Spence Street.

Cairns has three representatives in the Queensland Parliament, from the electoral districts of Barron River, Cairns and Mulgrave. The city is represented in the Federal Parliament by representatives elected from the districts of Leichhardt and Kennedy.

Cairns Regional Council
Division	Councillor	Councillor
Mayor	Amy Eden	Team Eden
1	Brett Moller	Unity Team
2	Matthew Tickner	Independent LNP
3	Cathy Zeiger	
4	Trevor Tim	Team Eden
5	Rob Pyne	Independent Socialist
6	Kristy Vallely	Unity Team
7	Anna Middleton	
8	Rhonda Coghlan	Unity Team
9	Brett Olds	Independent One Nation

Queensland
District	Member of Parliament	Party	Term
Barron River	Bree James	Liberal National Party of Queensland	2024–
Cairns	Michael Healy	Labor	2017–
Mulgrave	Terry James	Liberal National Party of Queensland	2024–

Australia
Division	Member of Parliament	Party	Term
Kennedy	Bob Katter	Katter's Australian	1993–
Leichhardt	Matt Smith	Labor	2025–

== Economy ==
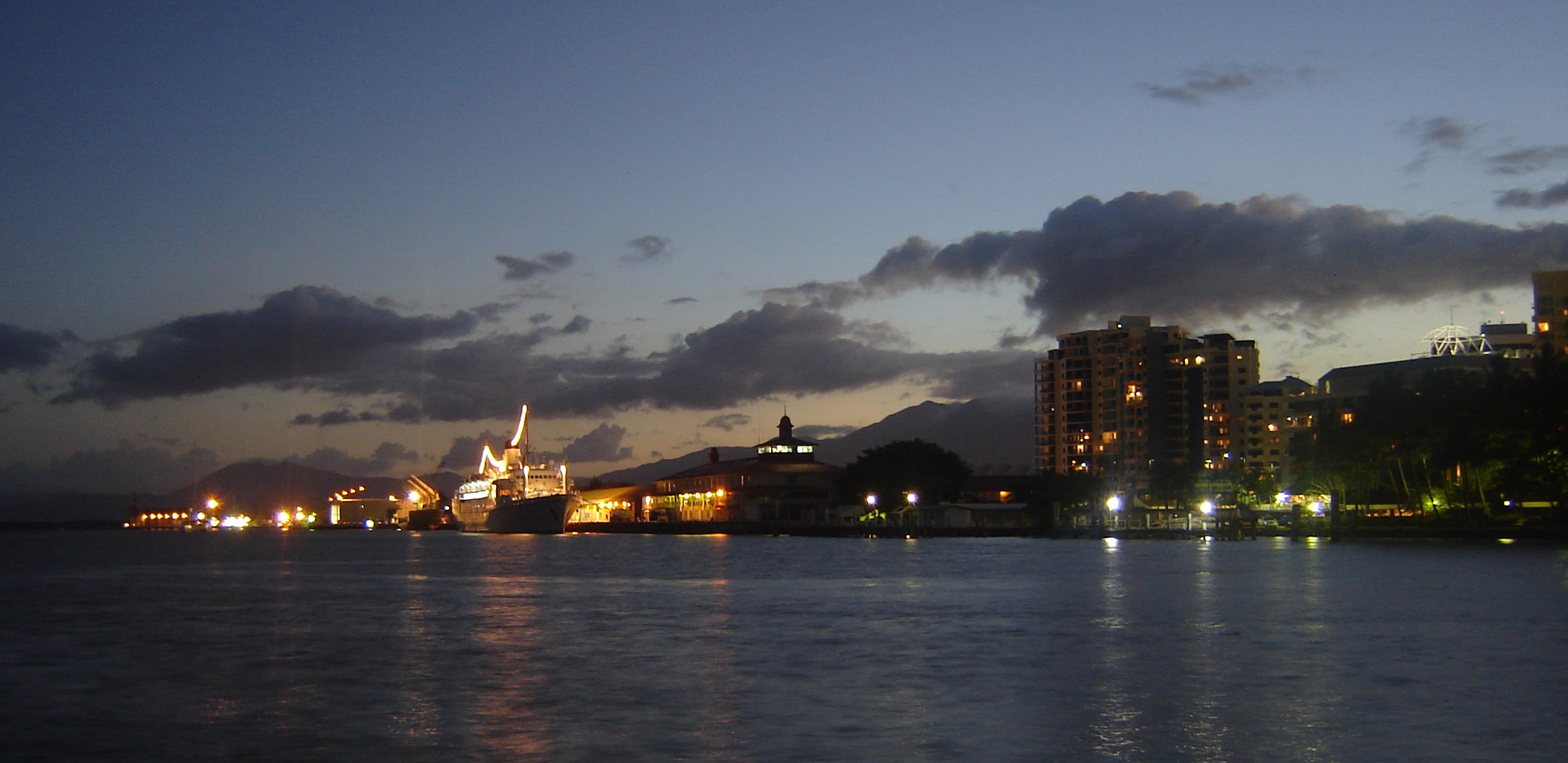
Cairns at night; the wharves. The casino's dome can be seen in the background.

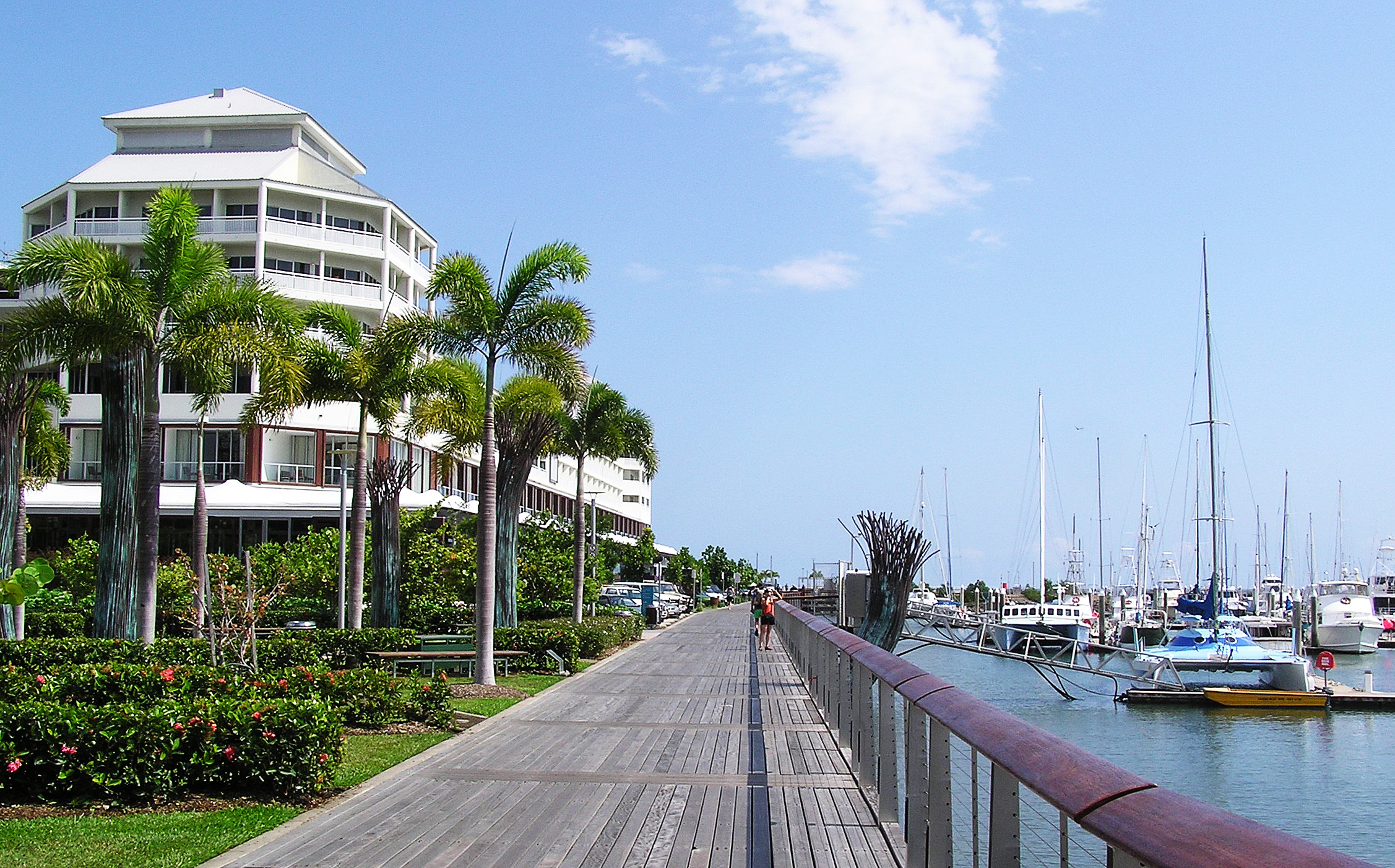
Cairns Pier

Cairns serves as the major commercial centre for the Far North Queensland and Cape York Peninsula Regions. It is a base for the regional offices of various government departments.

=== Tourism ===
Tourism plays a major part in the Cairns economy. According to Tourism Australia, the Cairns region is the fourth-most-popular destination for international tourists in Australia after Sydney, Melbourne and Brisbane. While the city does not rank amongst Australia's top 10 destinations for domestic tourism, it attracts a significant number of Australian holiday makers despite its distance from major capitals. There is also a growing interest in Cairns from the Chinese leisure market with regular scheduled direct flights from Chinese cities such as Shanghai and Guangzhou. During the 2013 Chinese Lunar New Year period alone, Cairns saw 20,000 Chinese holidaymakers flying in on chartered flights.

The city is near the Great Barrier Reef, the Wet Tropics of Queensland, and the Atherton Tableland. Great Barrier Reef tours that operate from Cairns are very popular and hence Cairns is also considered as the gateway to Great Barrier Reef.

The Cairns esplanade includes a swimming lagoon with adjoining barbecue areas. Cairns Esplanade Lagoon opened in March 2003. Though initially controversial, the 4800-square-metre pool has proved a very popular local attraction since its opening. In May 2003, the then Cairns Mayor Kevin Byrne declared that topless sunbathing is permitted here.

=== Commercial ===
Several shopping centres of various sizes are located throughout Cairns. The largest of these are Cairns Central shopping centre, located in the central business district (CBD), and Stockland Cairns, located in the suburb of Earlville. In Westcourt, one of the city's oldest shopping centres has been refurbished, with the city's first DFO. To service the needs of suburbs further from the city centre, shopping complexes are also located at Mount Sheridan, Redlynch, Smithfield, and Clifton Beach.

In 2010, the Queensland Government opened the second stage of William McCormack Place, an A$80 million office building credited as the first 6-star green star-rated building in the city.

=== Media ===
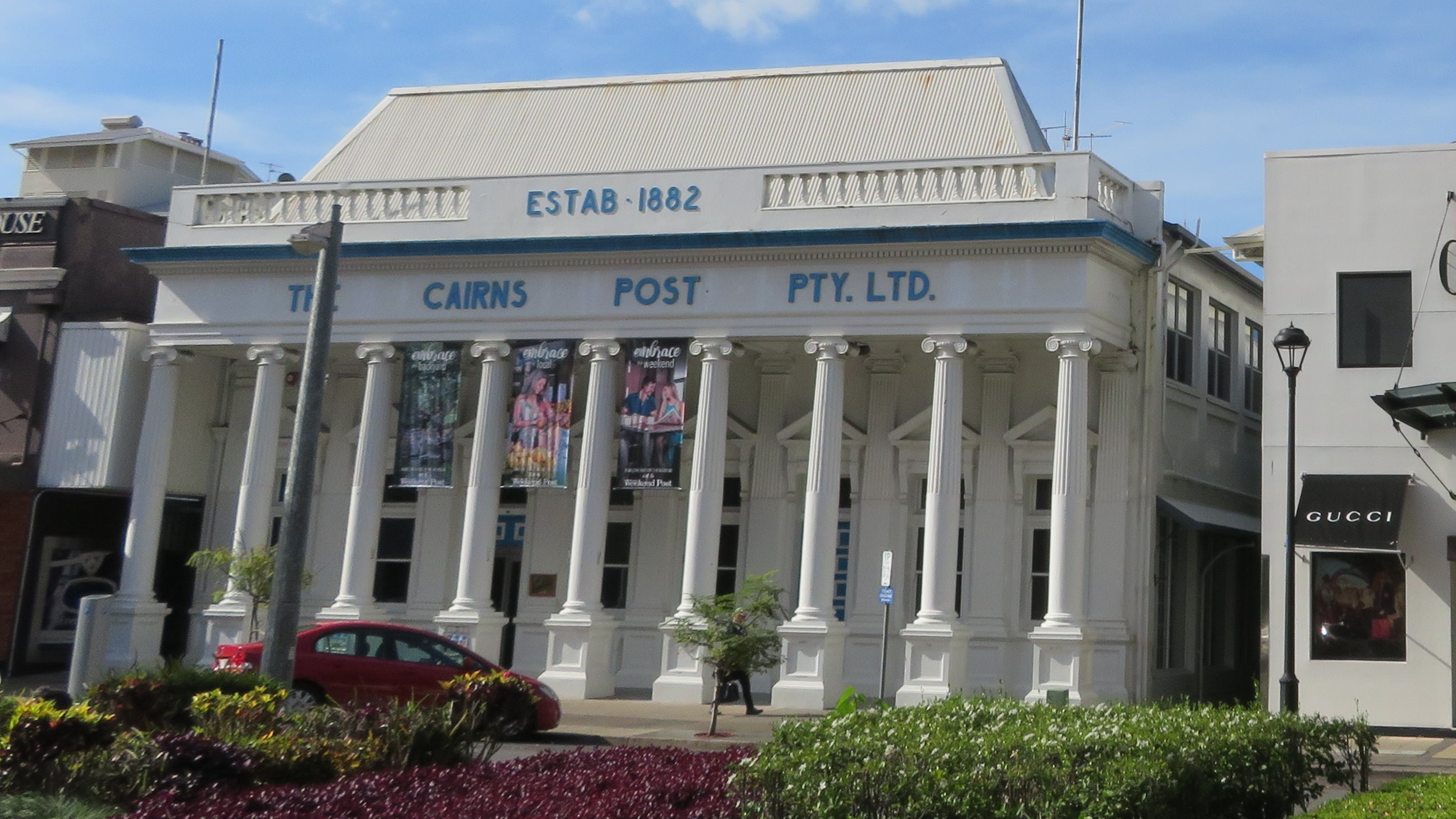
Premises of The Cairns Post on Abbott Street (2016)

The Cairns Post, published by Rupert Murdoch's News Corp. is the main daily newspaper published in the city. Widely available are also The Courier-Mail, a daily newspaper published in Brisbane, and the national broadsheet The Australian, which both are also published by News Corp.

Cairns is served by five television stations, three commercial television stations (WIN Television, Seven Queensland and Network 10) which are regional affiliates of the three Australian commercial television networks (10, Seven and Nine), and public broadcasters the ABC and SBS services.

Of the three major commercial networks:

- Seven News produces a half-hour local news bulletin for Cairns and Far North Queensland, airing each weeknight at 6pm. It is produced from a newsroom in the city and broadcast from studios in Maroochydore.
- WIN News airs a half-hour statewide news bulletin for Regional Queensland, airing each weeknight at 5:30pm. Select local stories from Cairns is inserted into this bulletin, although local weather remains intact at the end of the bulletin as an opt-out window. It is produced from a newsroom in the city and broadcast from studios in Wollongong. A dedicated local WIN News bulletin for Cairns was broadcast until 30th June 2021.
- Network 10 airs short regional 10 News updates throughout the day, broadcast from studios in Hobart.

Cairns radio stations include a number of public, commercial and community broadcasters. The ABC broadcasts ABC Far North, ABC Radio National, ABC NewsRadio, ABC Classic FM and the Triple J youth network. Commercial radio stations include Star 102.7, 4CA 846 AM, Hot FM (now Hit Network), Sea FM (now Triple M) and 104.3 4TAB sports radio, while the community radio stations are 4CCR-FM (Cairns FM 89.1), 101.9 Coast FM, Vision Christian Radio, Orbit FM 88.0FM & 87.8FM and 4CIM 98.7FM (Bumma Bippera Media).

=== Industry and agriculture ===
Significant land around Cairns is used for sugar cane farming, although this land is increasingly under pressure from new suburbs as the city grows. The Mulgrave Sugar Mill is located in Gordonvale (17.0929°S 145.7889°E).

The Barron Gorge Hydroelectric Power Station is located nearby on the lower Barron River, and provides green power.

== Transport ==
Cairns is an important transport hub in the Far North Queensland region. Located at the base of Cape York Peninsula, it provides important transport links between the Peninsula and Gulf of Carpentaria regions, and the areas to the south of the state. Cairns International Airport is essential to the viability of the area's tourism industry.

=== Roads ===
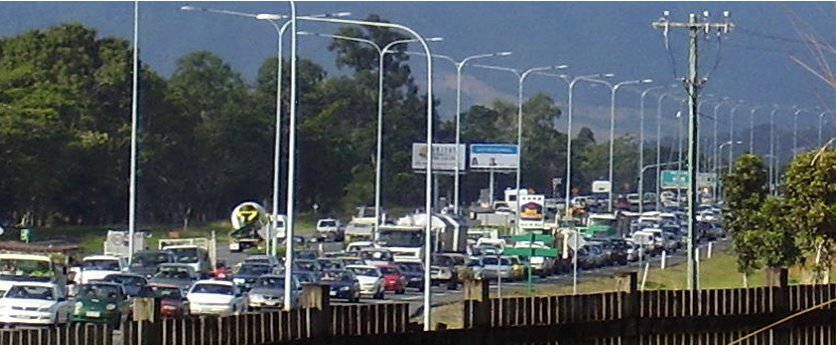
The Bruce Highway in Cairns southern suburbs at morning peak hour

The Bruce Highway runs for 1,700 km (1,056 mi) from Bald Hills on the City of Brisbane's northern boundary, and terminates in Woree, a southern suburb in Cairns. The Captain Cook Highway (also referred as the Cook Highway) commences at Aeroglen, a northern suburb of Cairns, and runs for approximately 76 km (47 mi) northwest to Mossman.

A need for future upgrades to the Bruce Highway to motorway standards through the southern suburbs to Gordonvale has been identified in regional planning strategies to cope with increasing congestion from rapid population growth. This will result in overpasses at all major intersections from Woree to Gordonvale. The motorway will divert from Bentley Park to Gordonvale, bypassing Edmonton to reduce the effects of road noise on residential areas.

The Kennedy Highway commences at Smithfield on the Barron River flood plain north of Cairns, and ascends the Macalister Range to the township of Kuranda. The highway then extends to the town of Mareeba on the Atherton Tableland, and continues to communities of Cape York Peninsula.

The Gillies Highway commences at the township of Gordonvale, and ascends the Gillies Range (part of the Great Dividing Range) to the town of Atherton on the Atherton Tableland, passing through the township of Yungaburra on the way.

The controversial private road, Quaid Road, was constructed in 1989 through what is now a Wet Tropics World Heritage Area, and links Wangetti, on the coast just north of Cairns, to Southedge, just south of Mount Molloy. The road is not open to the public and is not used for general traffic.

=== Bus ===
A public bus transit network exists within the city, with two transit hubs located within the CBD: the Cairns Central Railway Station precinct, and the Cairns City Bus Station located within the Lake street and Shield street area, through which all bus lines operate and provide linkage to taxi, ride share and intercity rail services. The transit network includes most parts of the city, from Palm Cove in the north, Gordonvale in the south and Redlynch to the west. It is managed throughout the city by Translink: through a service contract with the Kinetic Cairns, however the go card ticketing system has not been implemented in the region. A smaller shuttle bus service, Jon's Kuranda Bus runs between Cairns and Kuranda alongside other private coach services. The main bus hubs in the Cairns CBD are the Cairns City bus station, opened in 2014, and at Cairns Central, the former servicing almost all bus lines in Cairns.

Cairns is served by long-distance coaches to Brisbane, and regional cities to the south. Coaches also operate west to Mount Isa via Townsville, and to Alice Springs and Darwin in the Northern Territory.

=== Rail ===
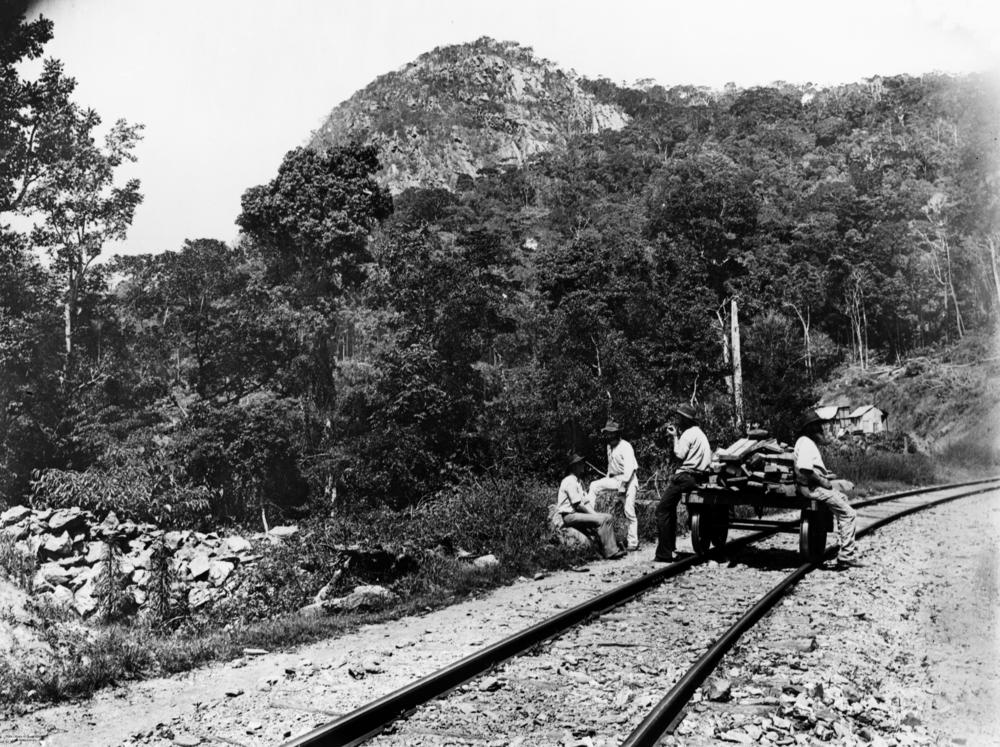
Railway workers on the Cairns Railway with a view of Glacier Rock in the background, c. 1891

Cairns railway station is the terminus for Queensland's North Coast railway line, which follows the eastern seaboard from Brisbane. Services are operated by Queensland Rail (QR) and include the high-speed Diesel Tilt Train. Freight trains also operate along the route, with a QR Freight handling facility located at Portsmith.

Pacific National Queensland (a division of Pacific National, owned by Asciano Limited) operates a rail siding at Woree. It runs private trains on the rail network owned by the Queensland State Government and managed by QR's Network Division.

The Kuranda Scenic Railway operates from Cairns. The tourist railway ascends the Macalister Range and is not used for commuter services. It passes through the suburbs of Stratford, Freshwater (stopping at Freshwater Station) and Redlynch before reaching Kuranda.

Freight services to Forsayth were discontinued in the mid-1990s. These were mixed freight and passenger services that served the semi-remote towns west of the Great Dividing Range. There is now a weekly passenger-only service, The Savannahlander, that leaves Cairns on Wednesday mornings. The Savannahlander is run by a private company, Cairns Kuranda Steam Trains.

Cairns is served by a narrow-gauge cane railway (or cane train) network that hauls harvested sugar cane to the Mulgrave Sugar Mill located in Gordonvale. The pressure of urban sprawl on land previously cultivated by cane farmers has seen this network reduced over recent years.

=== Airport ===
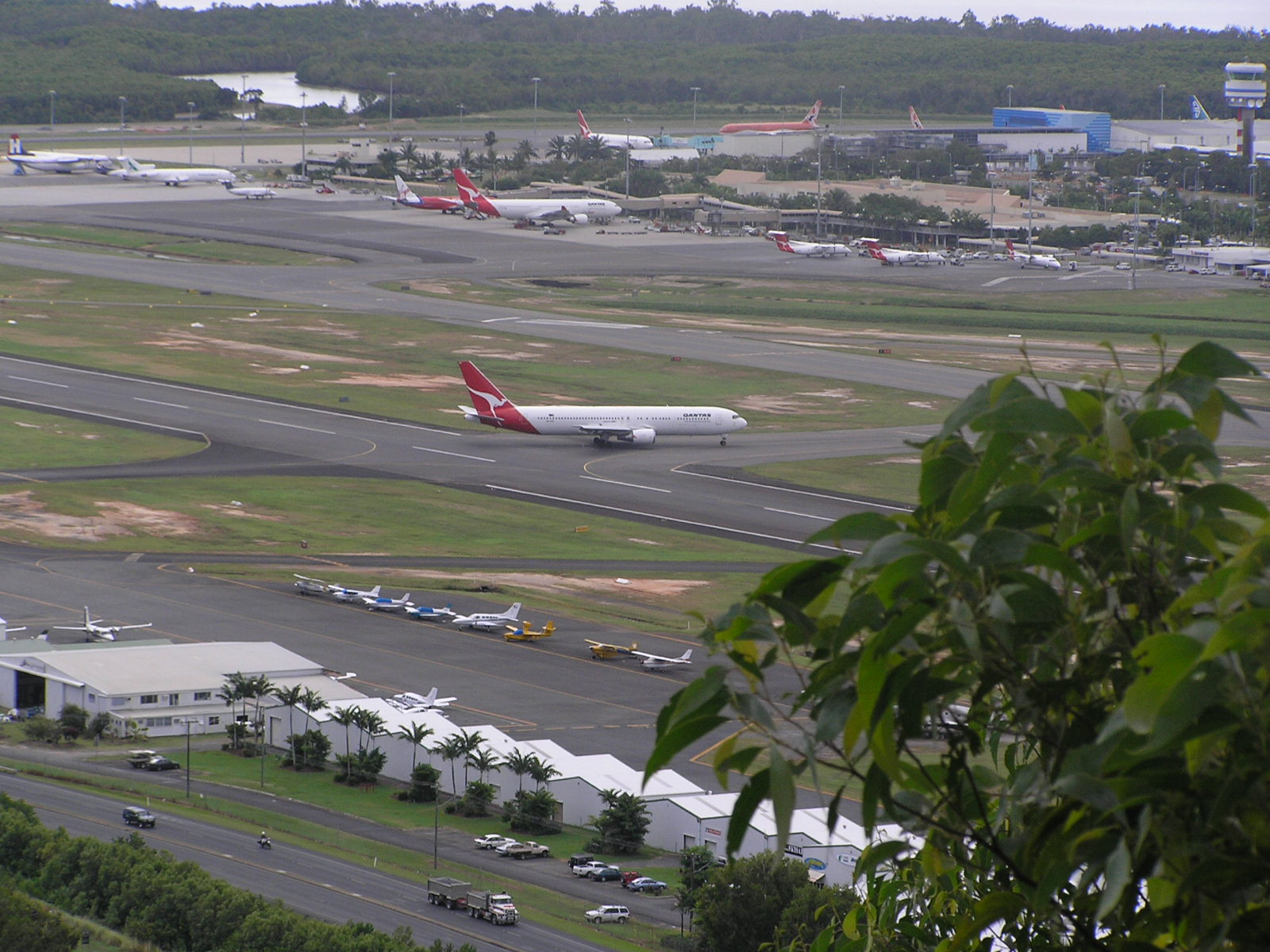
Cairns International Airport

Cairns International Airport is 7 km (4 mi) north of Cairns City between the CBD and the Northern Beaches. The domestic terminal at Cairns Airport underwent an extensive redevelopment which began in 2007 and was completed in 2010. In 2023, a new renovation began on the international terminal, which was expected to cost A$55 million.

The airport has a domestic terminal, an international terminal, and a general aviation area. The airport handles international flights, and flights to major Australian cities, tourist destinations, and regional destinations throughout North Queensland. It is an important base for general aviation serving the Cape York Peninsula and Gulf of Carpentaria communities. The Cairns airport is also a base for the Royal Flying Doctor Service.

=== Port ===
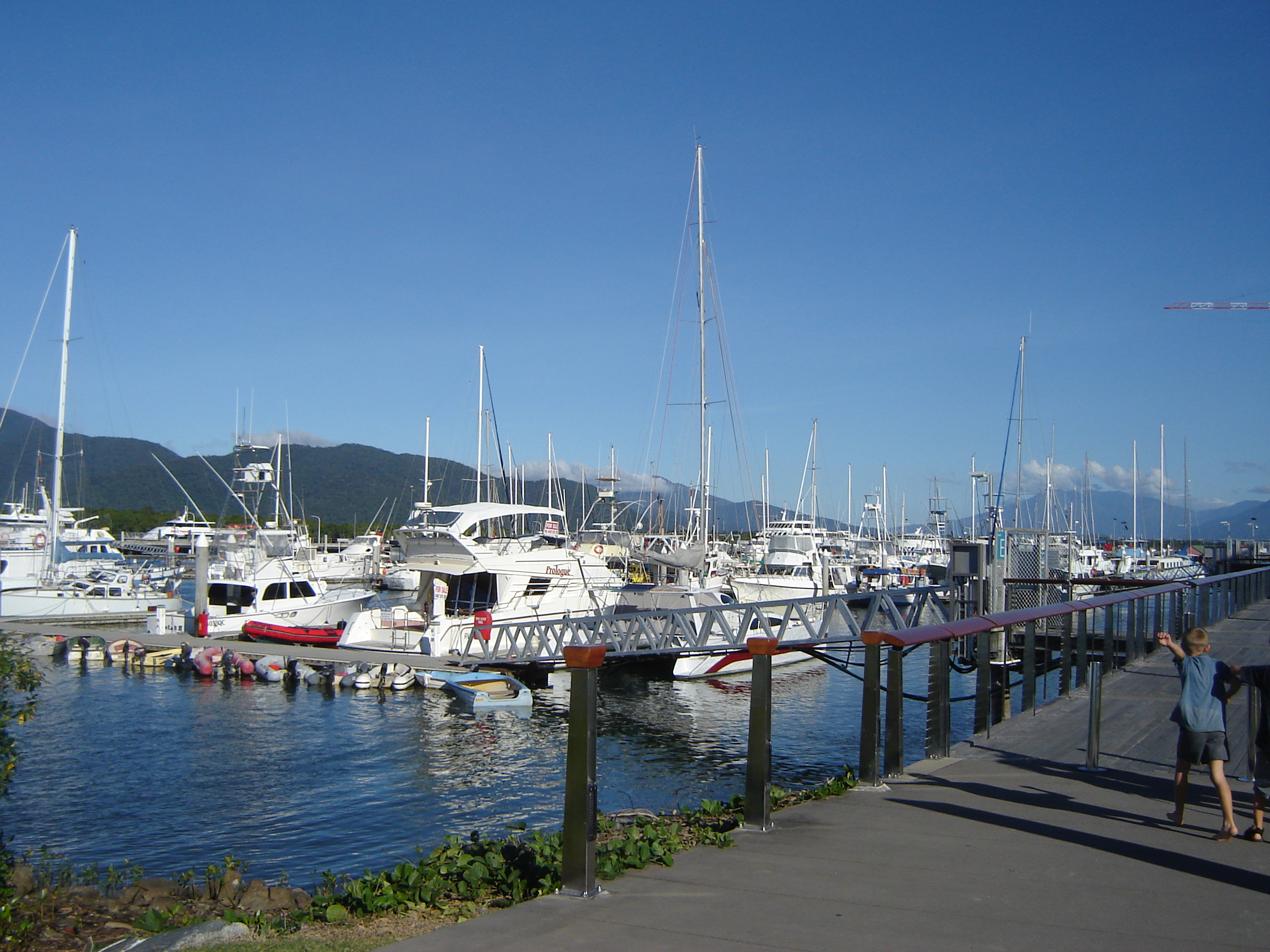
Cairns Marina

The Cairns Seaport, located on Trinity Inlet, is operated by the Cairns Port Authority. It serves as an important port for tourist operators providing daily reef trips. These consist of large catamarans capable of carrying over 300 passengers, as well as smaller operators that may take as few as 12 tourists. Cairns Port is also a port of call for cruise ships, such as Captain Cook Cruises, cruising the South Pacific Ocean. It also provides freight services to coastal townships on Cape York Peninsula, the Torres Strait and the Gulf of Carpentaria.

Yearly cargo through the port totals 1.13 million tonnes. Almost 90% of the trade is bulk cargoes, including petroleum, sugar, molasses, fertiliser and LP gas. A large number of fishing trawlers are also located at the port. There is also a marina that houses private yachts and boats used for tourist operations.

The Trinity Wharf has recently been the subject of a major redevelopment to improve the area for tourist and cruise ship operations. The freight wharves are located to the south of Trinity Wharf further up Trinity Inlet.

== Defence facilities ==
The Royal Australian Navy has a base in Cairns (HMAS Cairns). The base has a complement of 1000 personnel, and supports nine vessels, including:

- Three Armidale-class patrol boats of Ardent Division
- Two Cape-class patrol boats

Four ships of the Royal Australian Navy Hydrographic Service:

- Two Leeuwin-class hydrographic ships
- Two Paluma-class survey ships

Previously four of the six Balikpapan-class landing craft were based in Cairns before their decommissioning.

Porton Barracks, in the outlying suburb of Edmonton, is home to the Australian Army's 51st Battalion, Far North Queensland Regiment. Delta Company from the Townsville-based 31st/42nd Battalion, Royal Queensland Regiment is also based here. Both units are components of the Australian Army Reserve.

== Sister cities ==
- Minami, Japan (Tokushima Prefecture) since 1969
- Lae, Papua New Guinea (Morobe Province) since 1984
- Sidney, Canada (British Columbia) since 1984
- (United States) Scottsdale, USA (Arizona) since 1987
- Riga, Latvia since 1990
- Zhanjiang, People's Republic of China (Guangdong province) since 2005
- Oyama, Japan (Tochigi Prefecture) since 15 June 2006

A selection of memorabilia and artifacts relating to Cairns Sister Cities is displayed at Cairns City Library.

== Education ==
Cairns has numerous primary and secondary schools. Separate systems of public and private schools operate in Queensland.

The biggest high schools in Cairns are Cairns State High School located in Cairns North with 1,665 pupils and Trinity Bay State High School located in Manunda with around 1900+ students.

Catholic schools are operated by Catholic Education Cairns. The Catholic system encompasses nineteen primary schools, six secondary colleges and one P–12 college. The oldest Marist Brothers college in Cairns is St Augustine's, which is a secondary college. As of 2014 there were almost 6,700 primary students and 4,000 secondary students enrolled in the Roman Catholic school system.

There are also four other independent schools – Peace Lutheran College, Trinity Anglican School, Freshwater Christian College and Redlynch State College.

There is also Hinterland Cairns Steiner School, which is independent.

Cairns is home to two university campuses, with the Cairns Campus of James Cook University located at Smithfield and CQUniversity Australia has established a study centre in Cairns. The city also hosts a TAFE college, and a School of the Air base, both located in the inner suburb of Manunda.

== Health ==
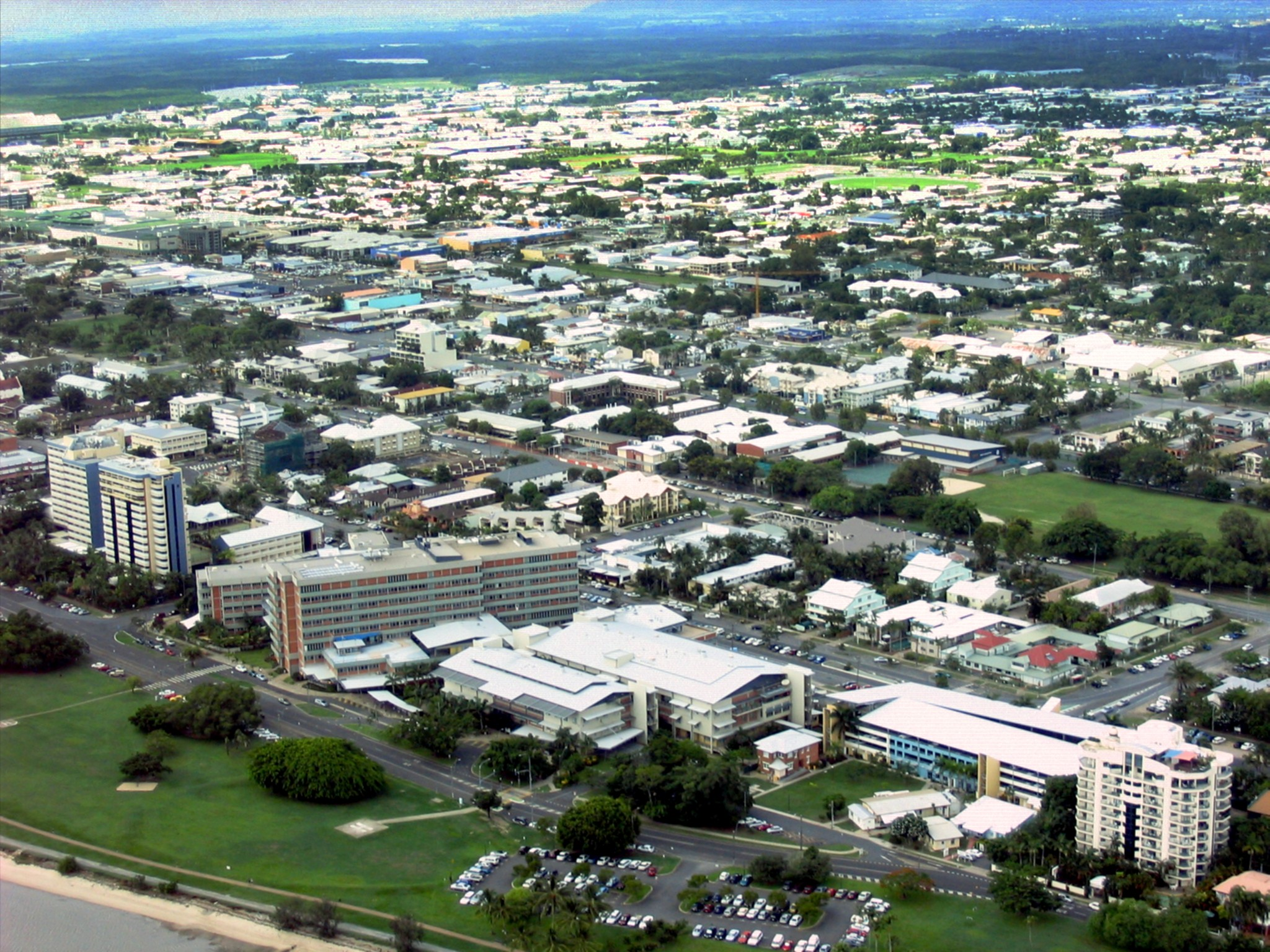
The Cairns Hospital from the air, facing south

The Cairns Hospital is situated on the Cairns Esplanade and is the major hospital for the Cape York Peninsula area. The smaller Cairns Private Hospital is located nearby. A new building was completed in 2015 to provide up to 168 more beds.

Cairns is a base for the Royal Flying Doctor Service, which operates clinics and provides emergency evacuations in remote communities throughout the region.

== Sport and recreation ==
=== Rugby league ===
Rugby league is the most popular sport in Cairns. The Northern Pride Queensland Cup rugby league team played their first season in 2008, and act as a feeder team to the North Queensland Cowboys who play in the National Rugby League. Cairns is represented by 11 senior clubs, most notably Brothers Cairns, Ivanhoes Knights, Cairns Kangaroos, Edmonton Storm and Southern Suburbs Cockatoos in the Cairns District Rugby League. Cairns also hosts growing bases for rugby union.

=== Other sports ===
Cairns has a National Basketball League (NBL) team, the Cairns Taipans, whose home court is the Cairns Convention Centre, known as The Snakepit during Taipans home games.

Cairns was home to Far North Queensland Heat, who played in the 2nd tier of soccer in Australia until their dissolution in 2018. The team has represented the city nationally previously at the 2014 FFA Cup. The team competes at Barlow Park. The Cairns region has a large soccer community with a local competition which spans from Port Douglas to Innisfail and west to Dimbulah. Notable soccer players from the region include Socceroos Frank Farina, Steve Corica, Shane Stefanutto and Michael Thwaite.

Cairns has a seven-team Australian rules football competition, AFL Cairns, between teams from the Cairns and Port Douglas region. Cazalys Stadium currently hosts one Australian Football League (AFL) game each season.

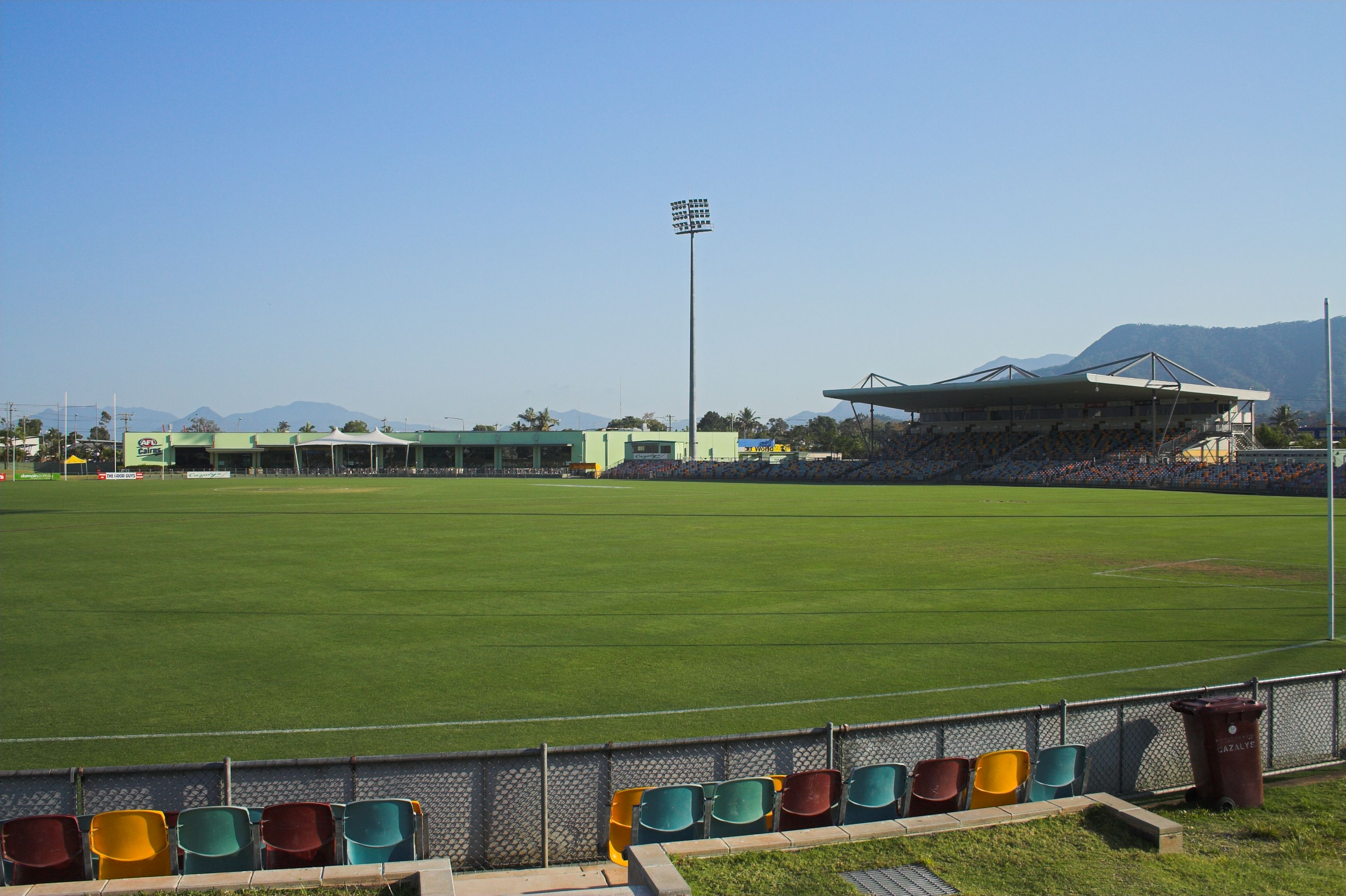
Cazaly's Stadium

In 1965 the City of Cairns Open, a professional golf tournament, was inaugurated. Significant golfers like Randall Vines and Vic Bennetts won the event. In the mid-1970s it evolved into an amateur event. In modern times, the week-long event encompasses four tournaments, including a mixed team event and separate men's and women's tournaments.

Cairns is a major international destination for water sports and scuba diving due to its close proximity to the Great Barrier Reef. Other recreational activities popular with tourists include whitewater rafting, skydiving, hang gliding, kitesurfing and snorkelling.

=== Sporting facilities ===
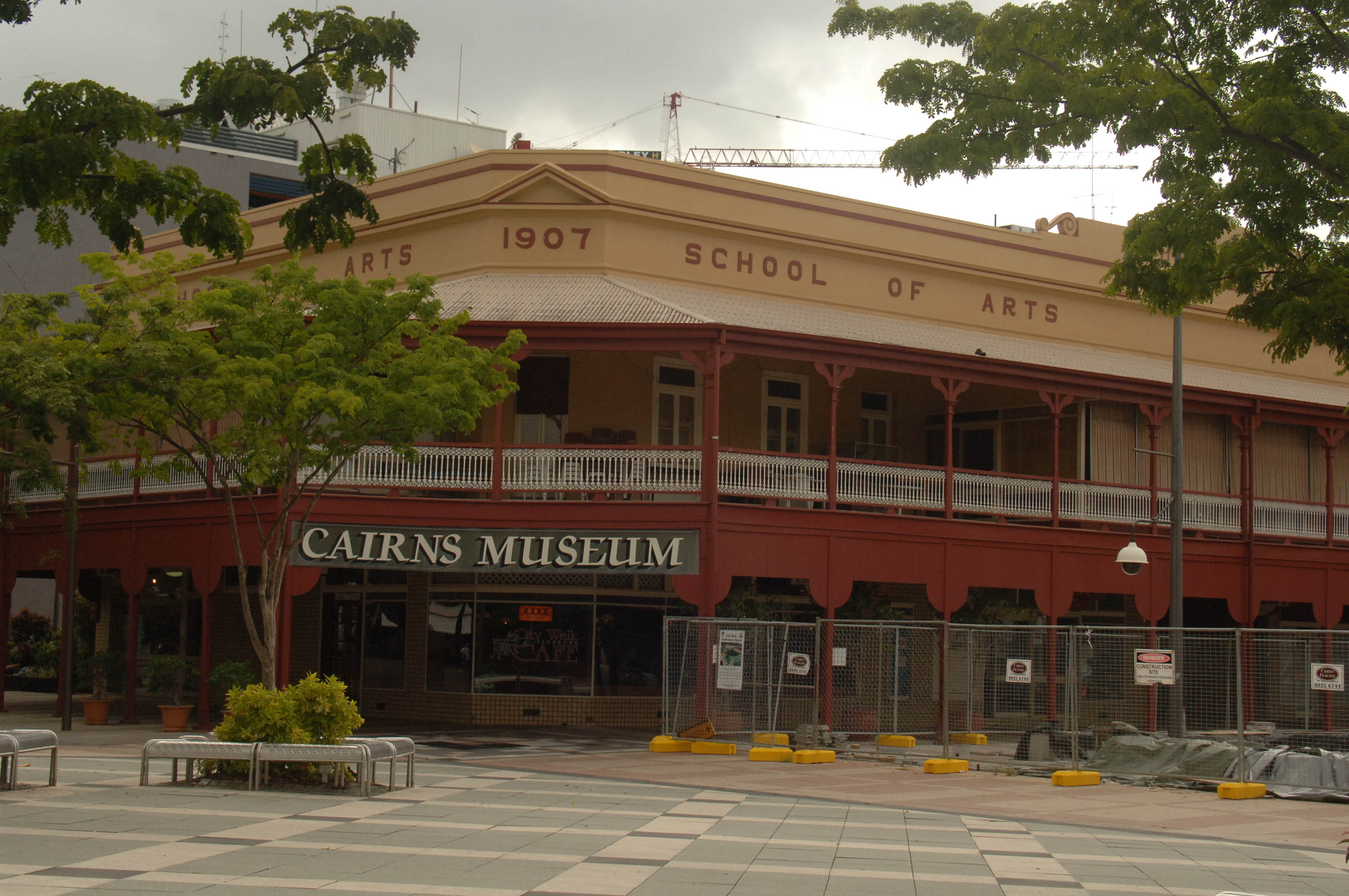
Cairns Museum

Notable sporting grounds include Barlow Park, Parramatta Park, Cazalys Stadium, the Cairns Convention Centre, and the Cairns Hockey Centre. The Cairns Showground is used for sports, in addition to the Cairns Show and funfairs.

== Amenities ==
Established in 1978, the Cairns & District Chinese Association is an arts and heritage organisation seeking to preserve the Chinese culture and heritage of Cairns and North Queensland and enriching the contemporary cultural, social and economic diversity of the community. The society organises events such as the Chinese New Year Festival, organises Lion dancers and dragon boat racing, maintains the Lit Sung Goong Temple, and offers Chinese language classes and social group activities.

Established in 1989, the Cairns and District Family History Society maintains a library of world-wide genealogy material at 271 Gatton Street, Westcourt. The society publishes new genealogical resources based on collecting and indexing family information relating to Far North Queensland.

The Cairns Historical Society operates the Cairns Museum and Cairns Historical Society Resource Centre at the former Cairns School of Arts building on the corner of Lake and Shields Streets in Cairns City.

The Cairns branch of the Queensland Country Women's Association meets at 264 Grafton Street, Cairns North.

St Monica's Catholic Cathedral is at 183 Abbott Street. It is within the Cairns Cathedral Parish of the Roman Catholic Diocese of Cairns.

== Indigenous languages and representation ==
The Yidiny language is a prominent language of the Cairns area.

Irukandji language (also known as Yirrgay, Yurrgay, Yirrgandji, Djabuganjdji and Yirgay) is a language of Far North Queensland, particularly the area around the Kuranda Range and Lower Barron River. The Irukandji language region includes the landscape within Cairns Regional Council.

Yumplatok (also known as Torres Strait Creole and Broken) is a contemporary Torres Strait Island language originating in the Torres Strait. The contact with missionaries and others since the 1800s has led to the development of a pidgin language, which transitioned into a creole language and now has its own distinctive sound system, grammar, vocabulary, usage and meaning. Torres Strait Creole is spoken by most Torres Strait Islanders and is a mixture of Standard Australian English and traditional languages. It is an English-based creole; however, each island has its own version of creole. Torres Strait Creole is also spoken on the Australian mainland, including Northern Peninsula Area Region and coastal communities such as Cairns, Townsville, Mackay, Rockhampton and Brisbane.

There are four traditional owner groups representing the rights and interests of the peoples of the Cairns region. The Dawul Wuru (Yirrganydji) Aboriginal Corporation represents traditional owners in the area between Cairns and Port Douglas. Native title rights have been granted to the Djabugay people over land and waters within the Barron Gorge National Park near Kuranda. The Gunggandji people hold rights over more than 7,500 ha (19,000 acres) on the Yarrabah Peninsula. The fourth group represents the Yidinji clans, and comprises Gimuy Walubara Yidinji, Dulabed Malanbarra and Yidinji, Mandingalbay Yidinji and Wadjanbarra Tableland Yidinji.

== Notable people ==
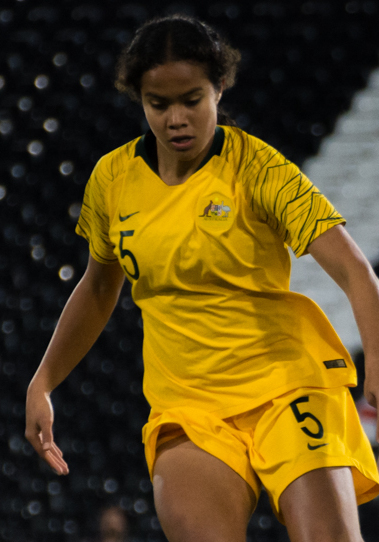
- Mary Fowler
  Gavin Allen, Queensland and Brisbane Broncos Rugby League player
- Christine Anu, pop singer and actress
- Aron Baynes, basketball player in the NBA
- Poppy Boltz, AFLW footballer
- Matt Bowen, rugby league player
- Jack Bowes, AFL footballer
- Daniel Boyd, contemporary artist
- Leonard John Brass, botanist
- Mark "Yank" Cantoni, rugby league player
- Kev Carmody, singer-songwriter, born in Cairns
- Clinton Cave, singer-songwriter in Chase Atlantic
- Mitchel Cave, singer-songwriter in Chase Atlantic
- Troy Clarke, AFL footballer
- Che Cockatoo-Collins, AFL footballer
- Terence Cooper, film actor, artist
- Alex Davies, AFL footballer
- Courtenay Dempsey, AFL footballer, Essendon Football Club
- Charlie Dixon, AFL footballer, Port Adelaide Football Club
- DMo, artist
- Jacqui Dupuy, AFLW footballer and netballer
- Judi Farr, Australian actress (My Name's McGooley, What's Yours? and Kingswood Country)
- Evie Ferris, member of the children's band The Wiggles
- Michael 'Tarzan' Fomenko (1930–2018), eccentric bushman who lived in the rainforests of Northern Queensland and Cairns for over 50 years
- Mary Fowler, soccer player for Australia
- Virginia Giuffre, American-Australian advocate for victims of sex trafficking, best known for her testimony against Jeffrey Epstein
- Caleb Graham, AFL footballer
- Catriona Gray, Miss Universe winner
- Ben Halloran, footballer for Adelaide United
- Ken Ham, creationist and religious activist
- Tracey Hannah, downhill mountain biker
- Jarrod Harbrow, AFL footballer, Gold Coast Football Club
- Xavier Herbert, writer
- Jacob Heron, AFL footballer
- Justin Hodges, international rugby league player
- Erin Holland, singer and television host
- Nathan Jawai, professional basketball player, first indigenous Australian to play in NBA
- Danilo Jovanovitch, poet
- Leah Kaslar, AFLW footballer
- Susan Kiefel, chief justice, High Court of Australia
- Richard Ash Kingsford, mayor of Brisbane, first mayor of Cairns
- Emma Louise, musician
- Isabel Lucas, actress
- Rayleen Lynch, retired Australian basketball player
- Steven Marshall, watch house officer and whistleblower
- Rhyse Martin, rugby league player, Canterbury-Bankstown Bulldogs
- Ryan McGoldrick, rugby league player, Castleford Tigers
- Grant McLennan, musician, The Go-Betweens
- Nate Myles, international rugby league player
- Johnny Nicol, musician
- Grant Patterson, Paralympic swimmer
- Wilma Reading, singer
- Adam Sarota, international football player
- Xavier Savage, rugby league player
- Hamiso Tabuai-Fidow, rugby league player
- Michael Thwaite, footballer for Liaoning Whowin, and occasionally Socceroo
- Brenton Thwaites, actor
- Thomas Waddingham, soccer player for Portsmouth
- Rhys Wakefield, actor
- Naomi Wenitong, member of former pop and R&B duo Shakaya

== Gallery ==
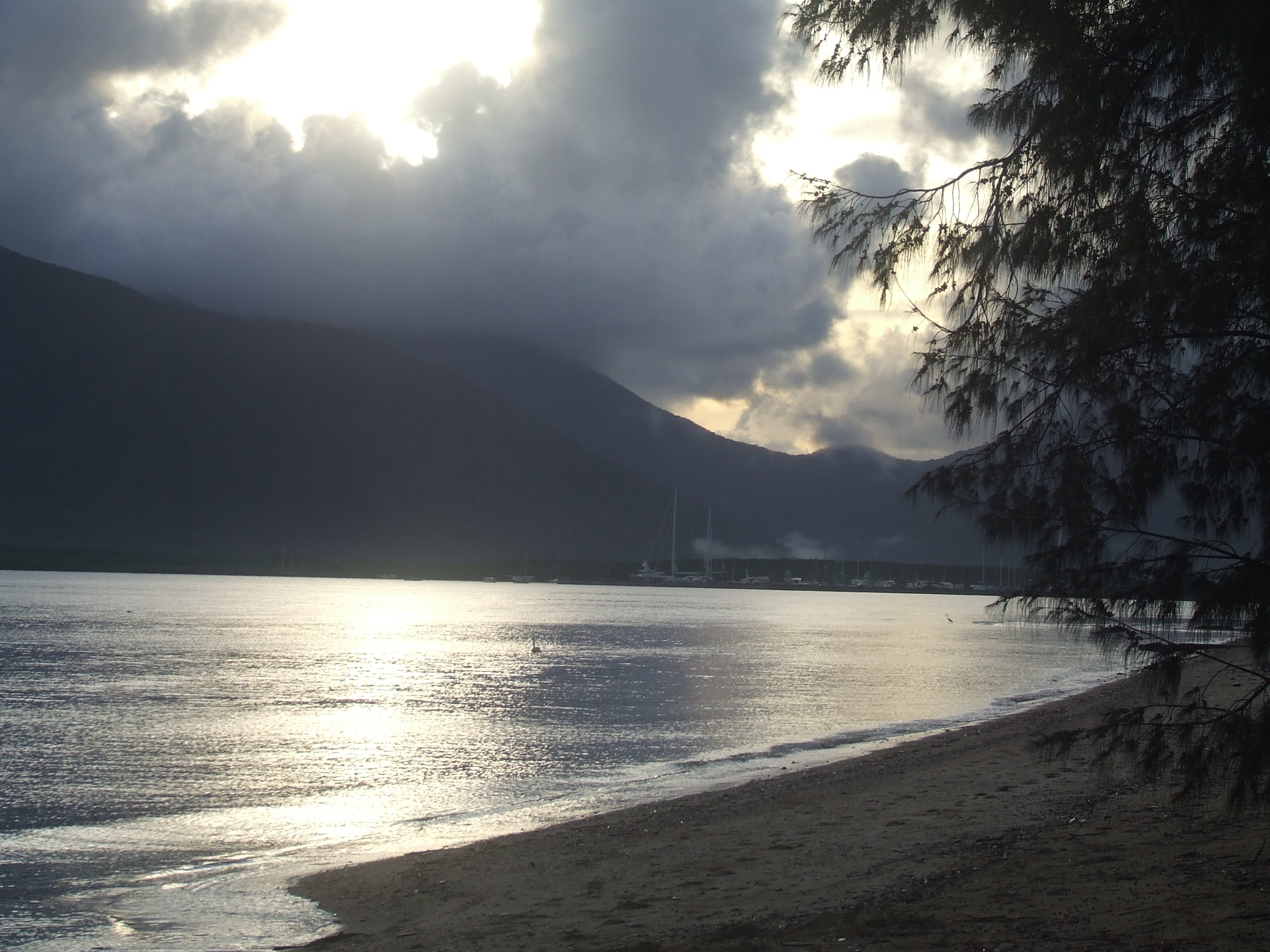
View of the pier and Esplanade at dawn

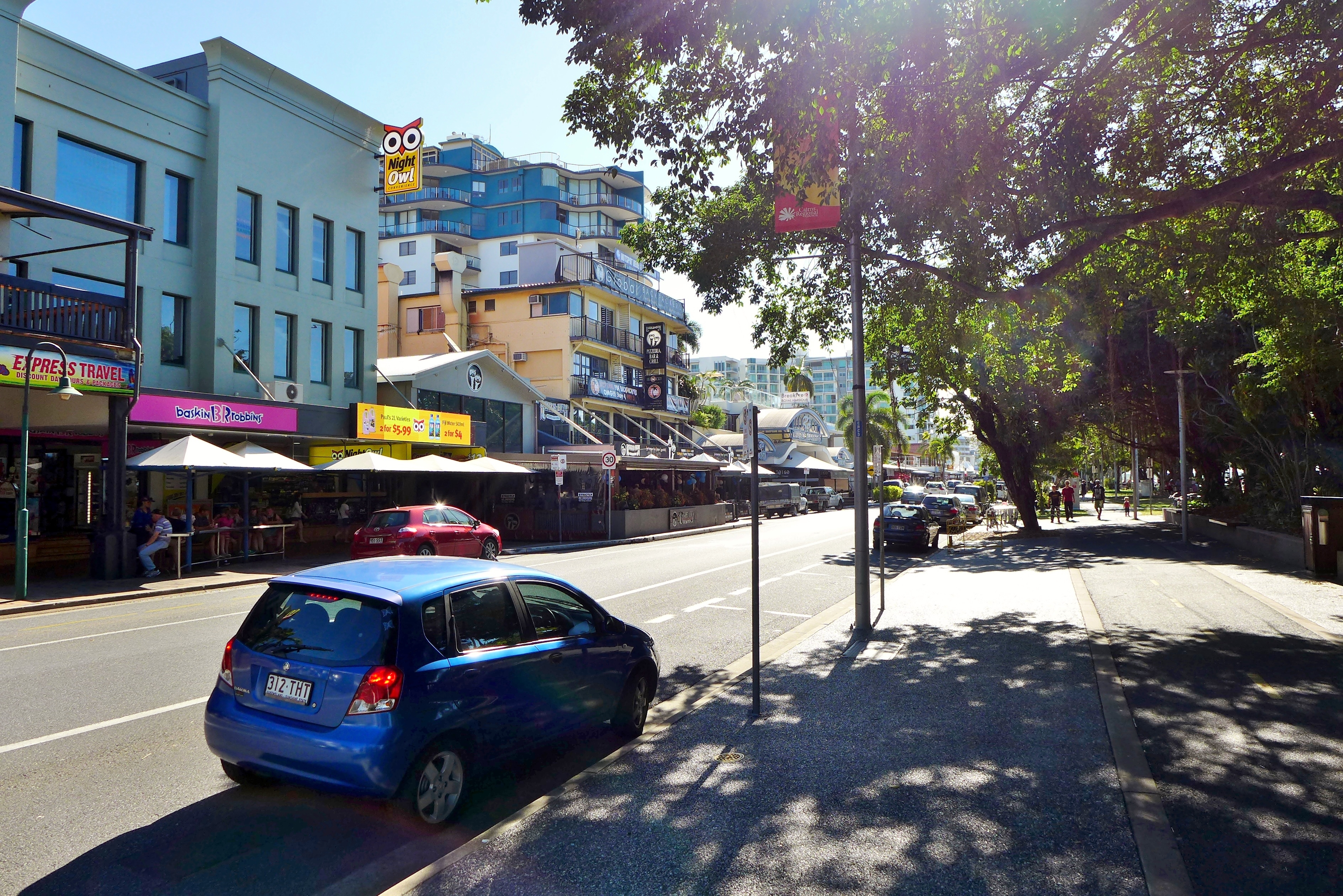
City centre

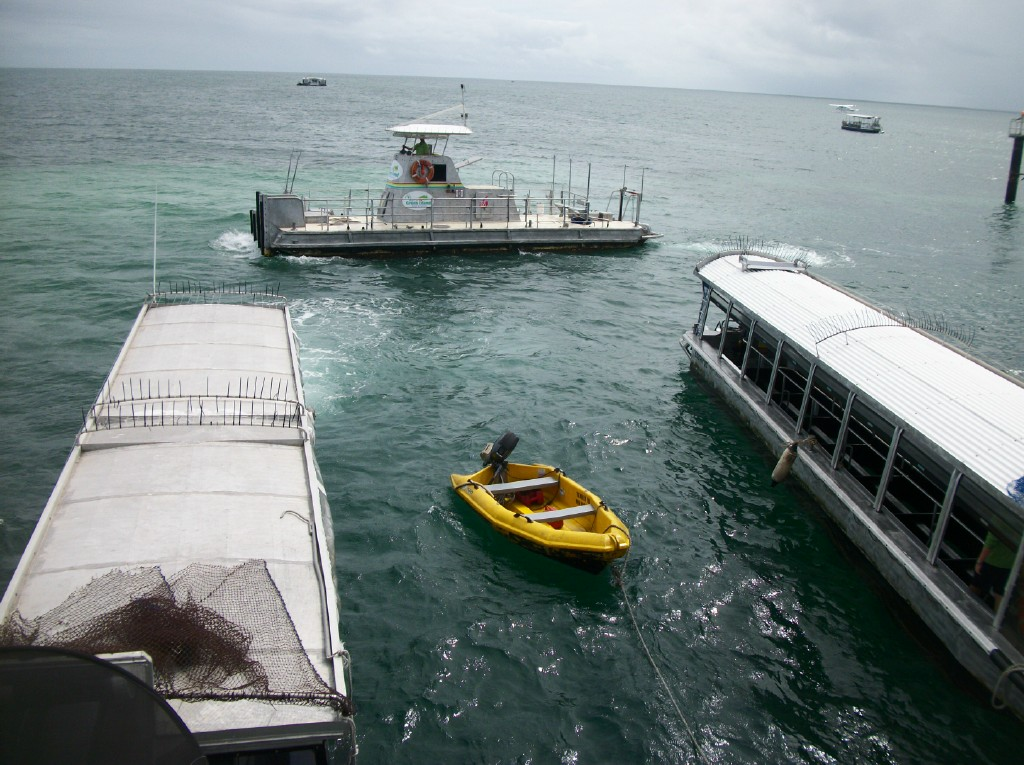
Glass bottom boats and a Semi submarine at Green Island, Great Barrier Reef, outer Cairns

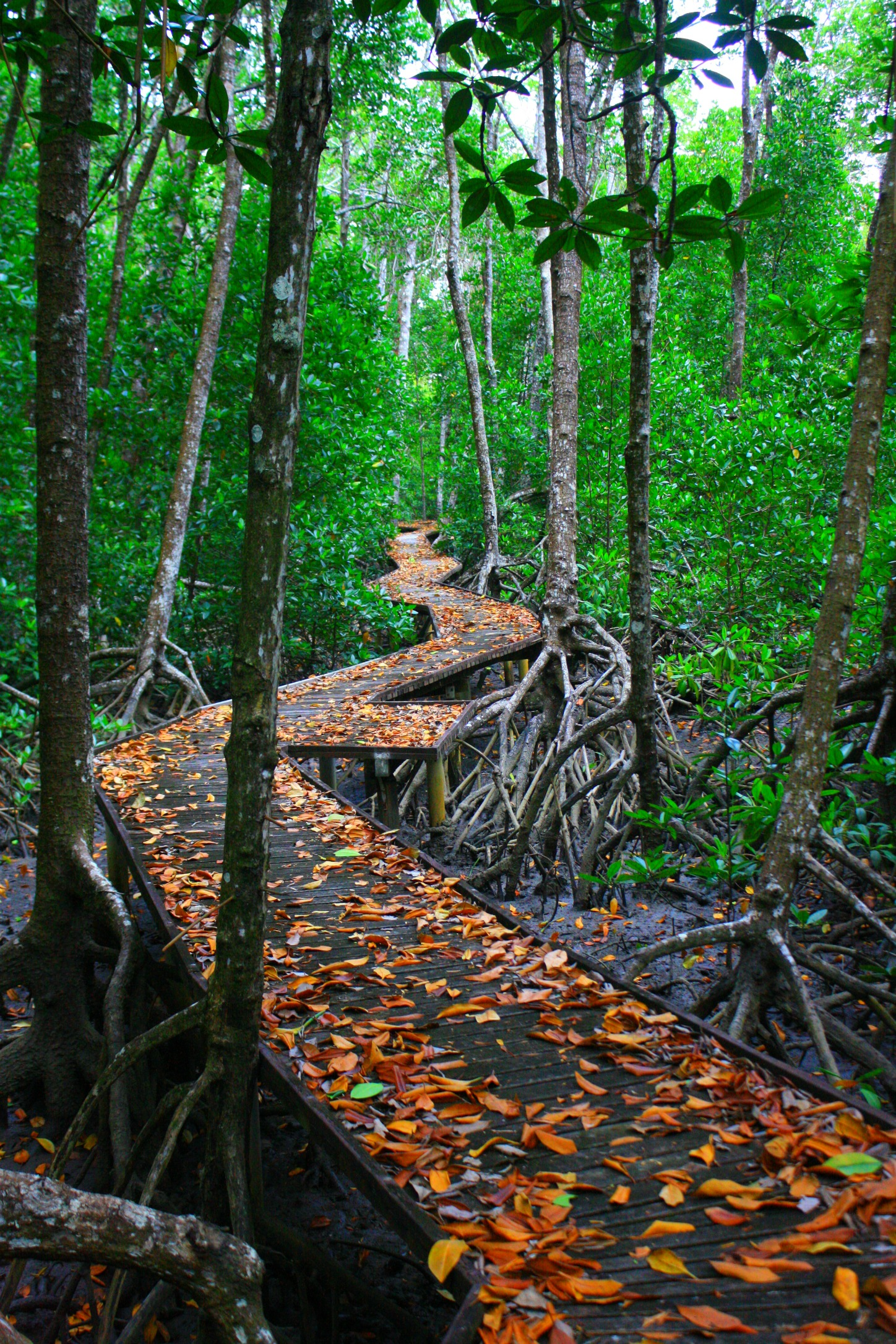
Jack Barnes Bicentennial Mangrove Boardwalk

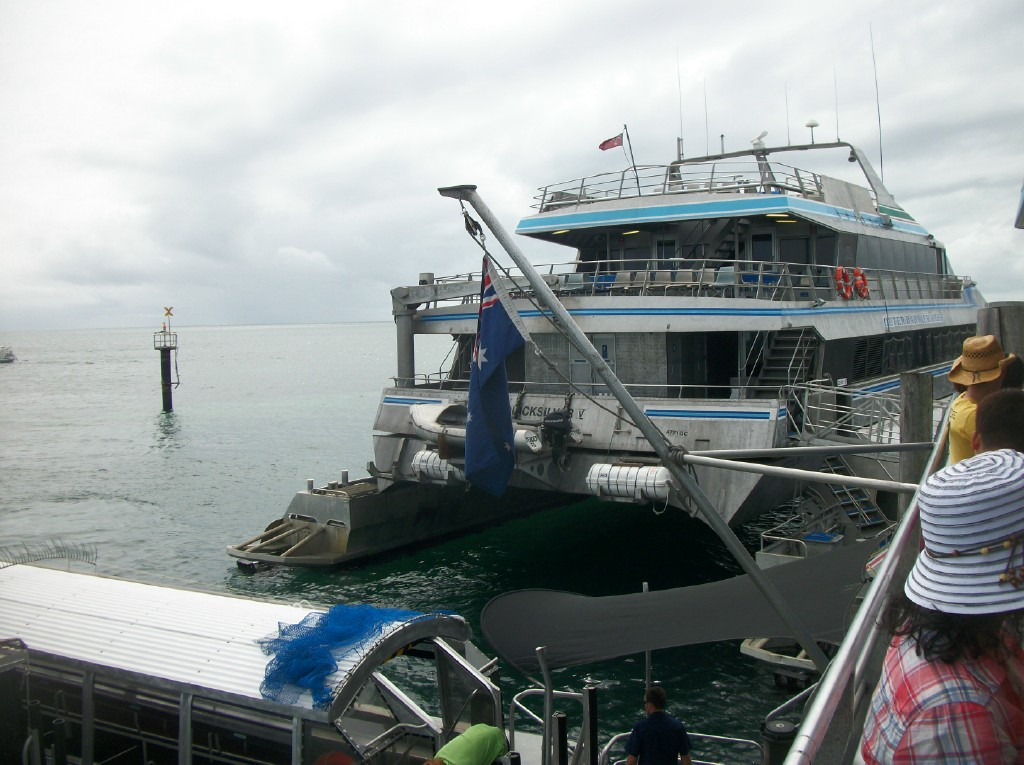
A Great Barrier Reef ferry, Green Island, outer Cairns

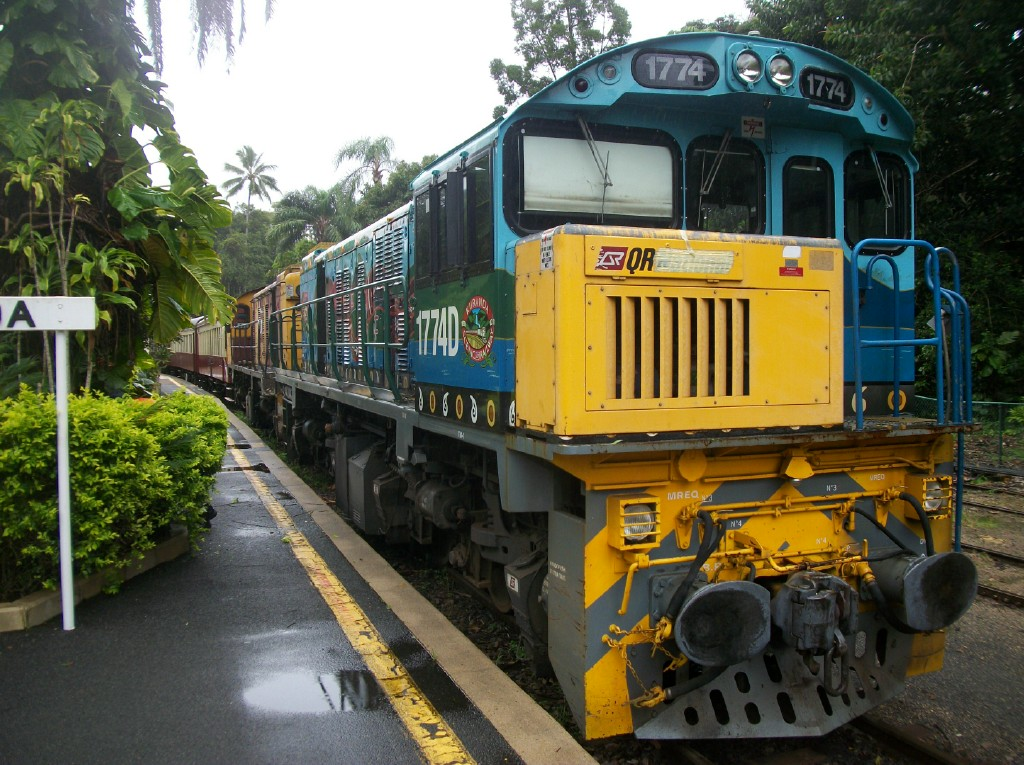
Kuranda scenic railway, Kuranda

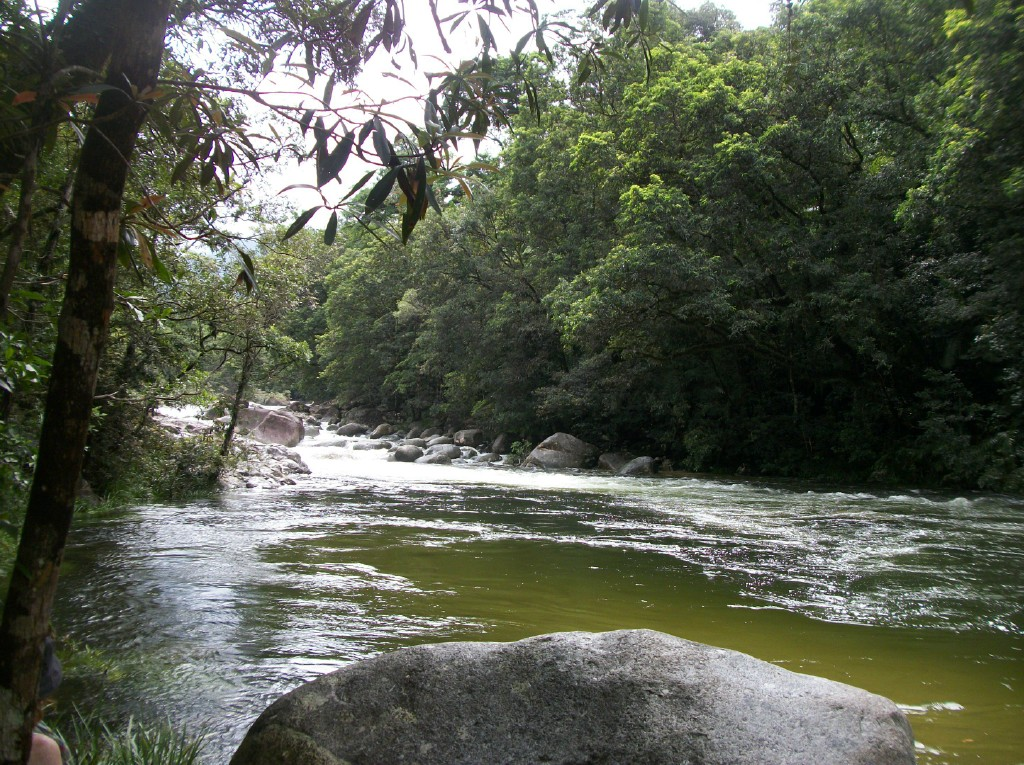
Mossman river and gorge, Daintree National Park, outskirts of Cairns

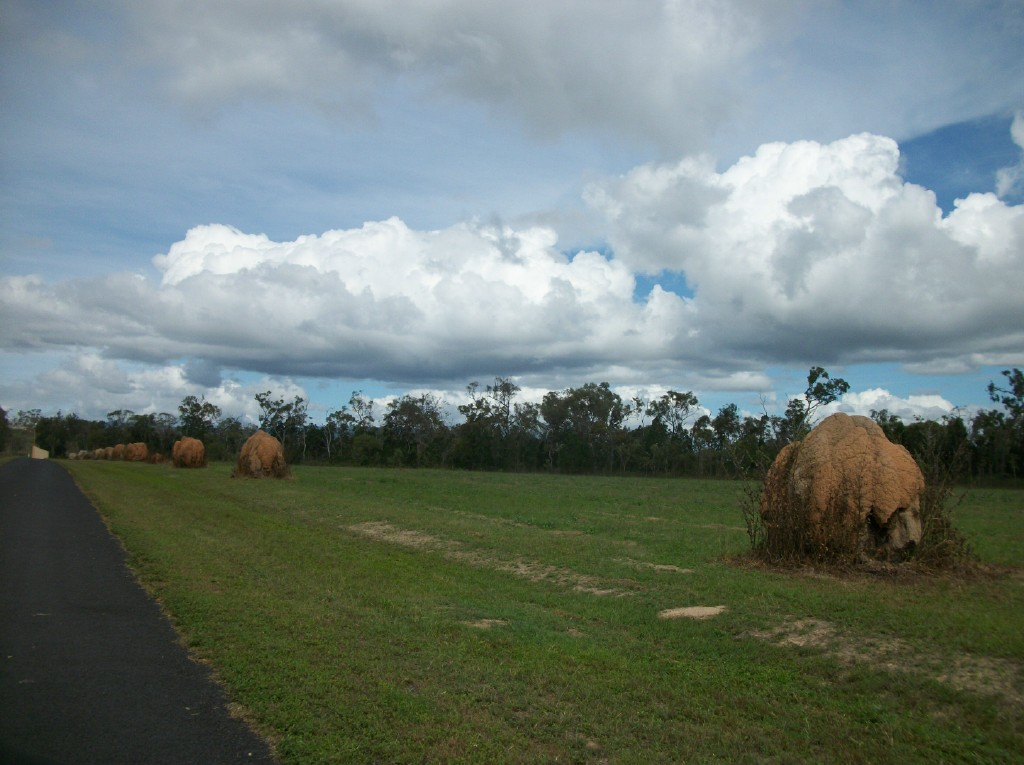
Moved termite mounds, Mareeba, Queensland, outskirts of Cairns

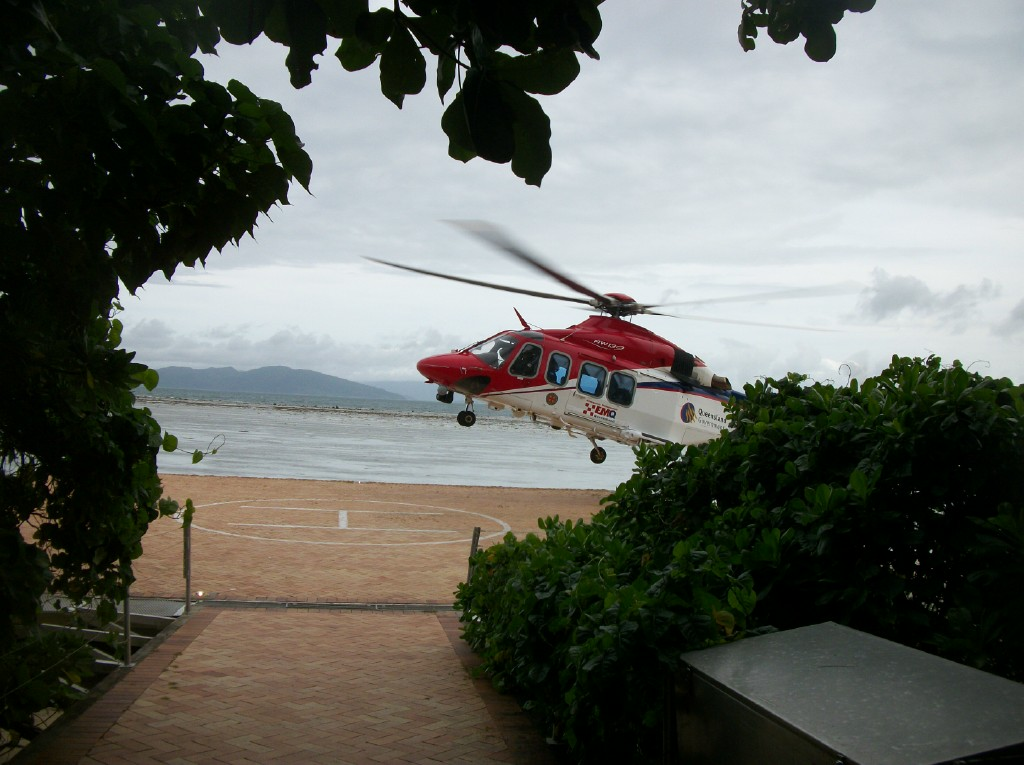
Queensland rescue helicopter, Green Island, Great Barrier Reef, outskirts of Cairns

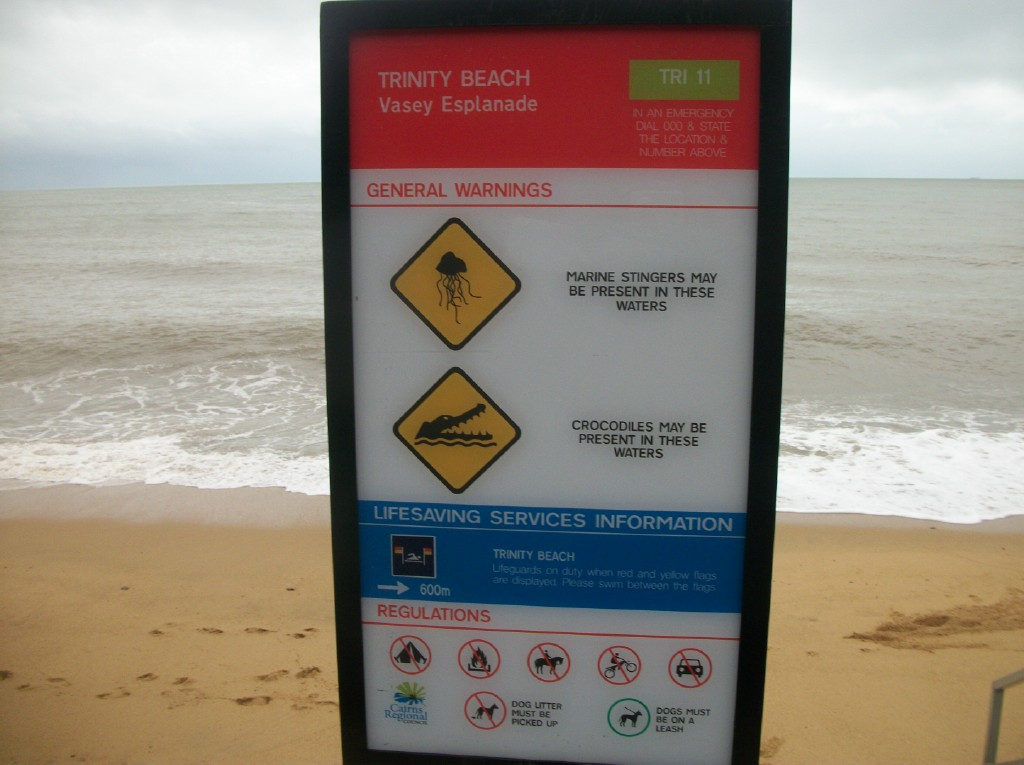
Marine stingers sign, Trinity beach, Cairns

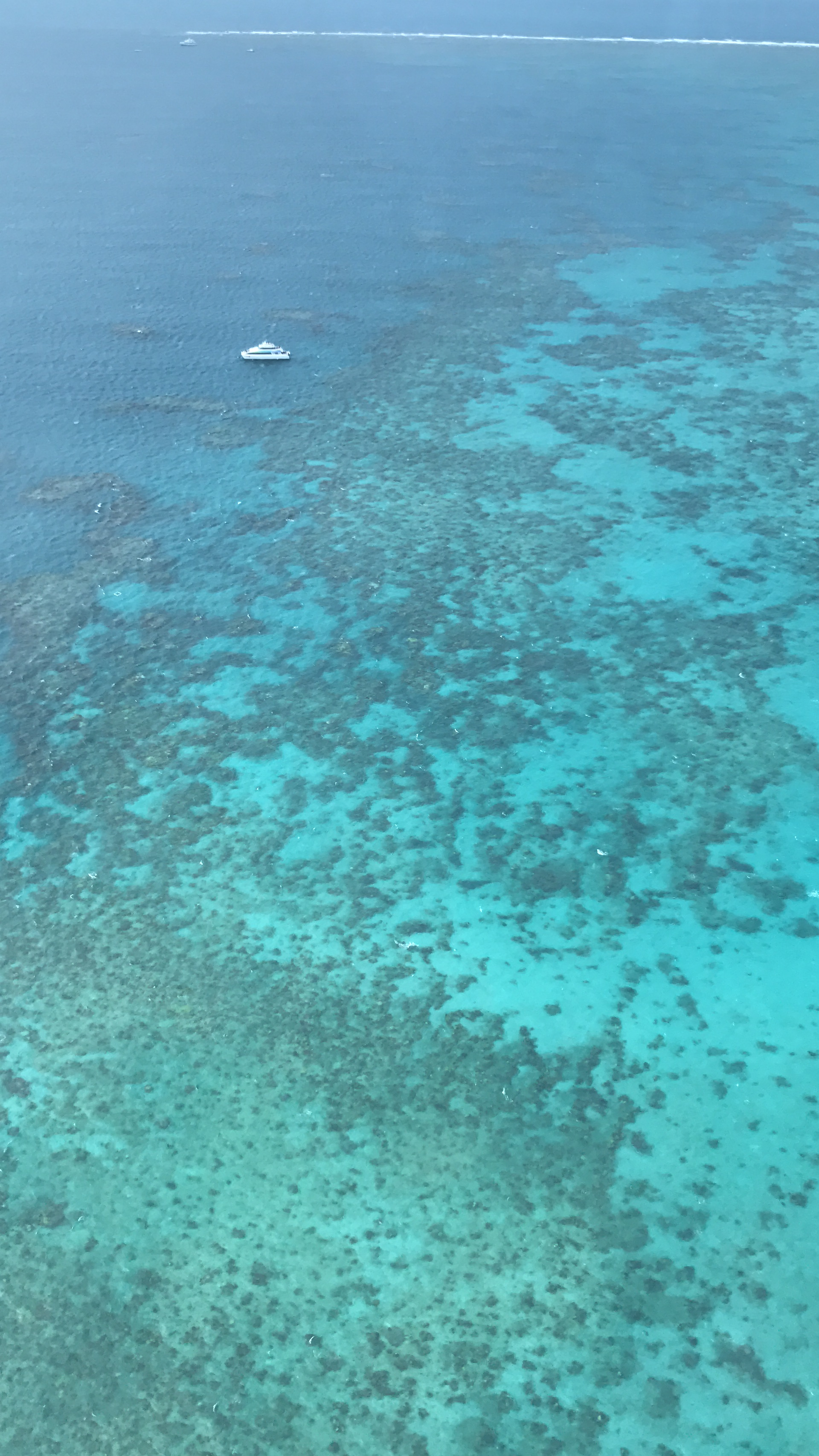
Hastings Reef

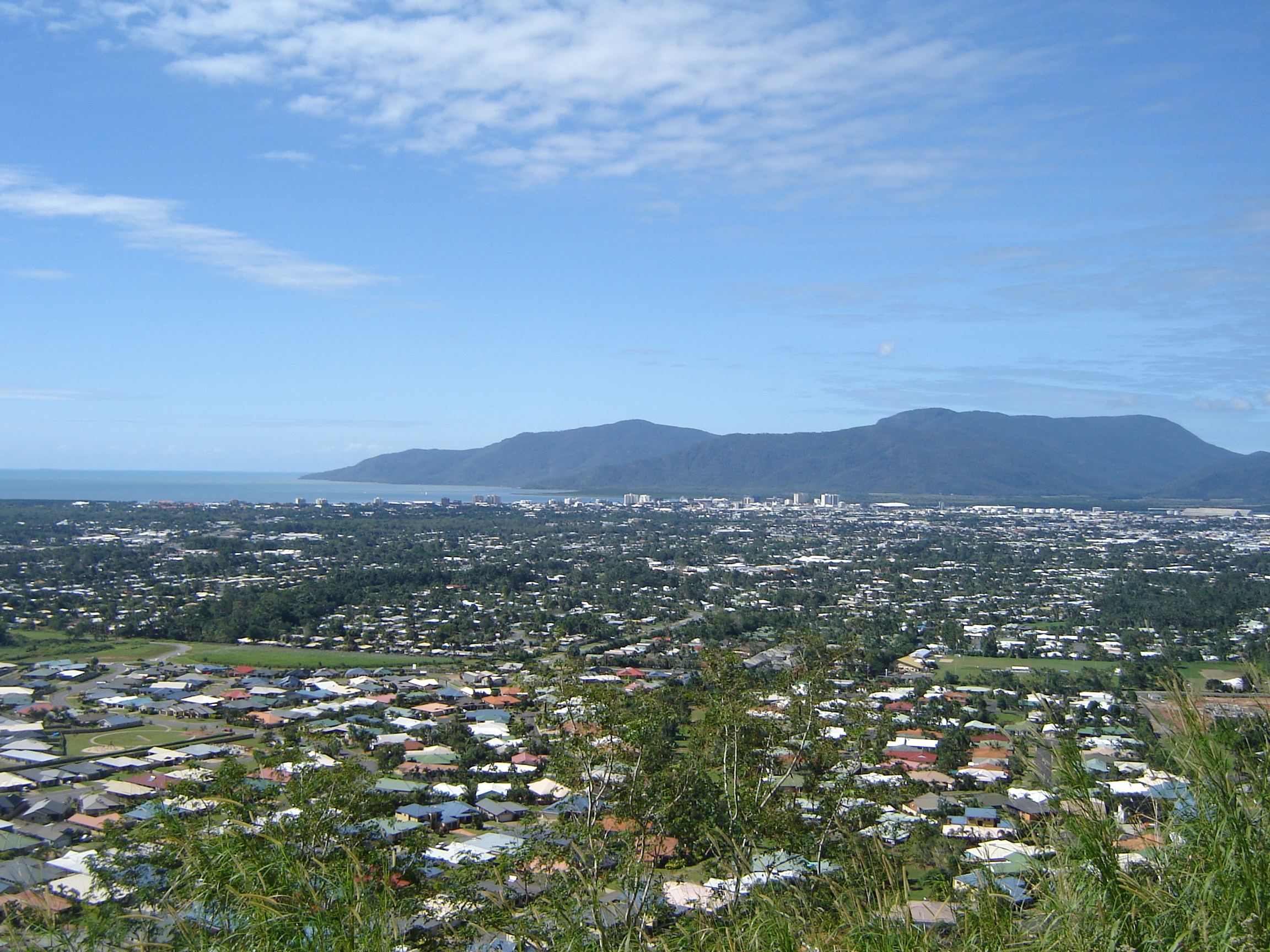
City landscape

== See also ==
- Cairns road network
