= William Walter Mason Bridge =

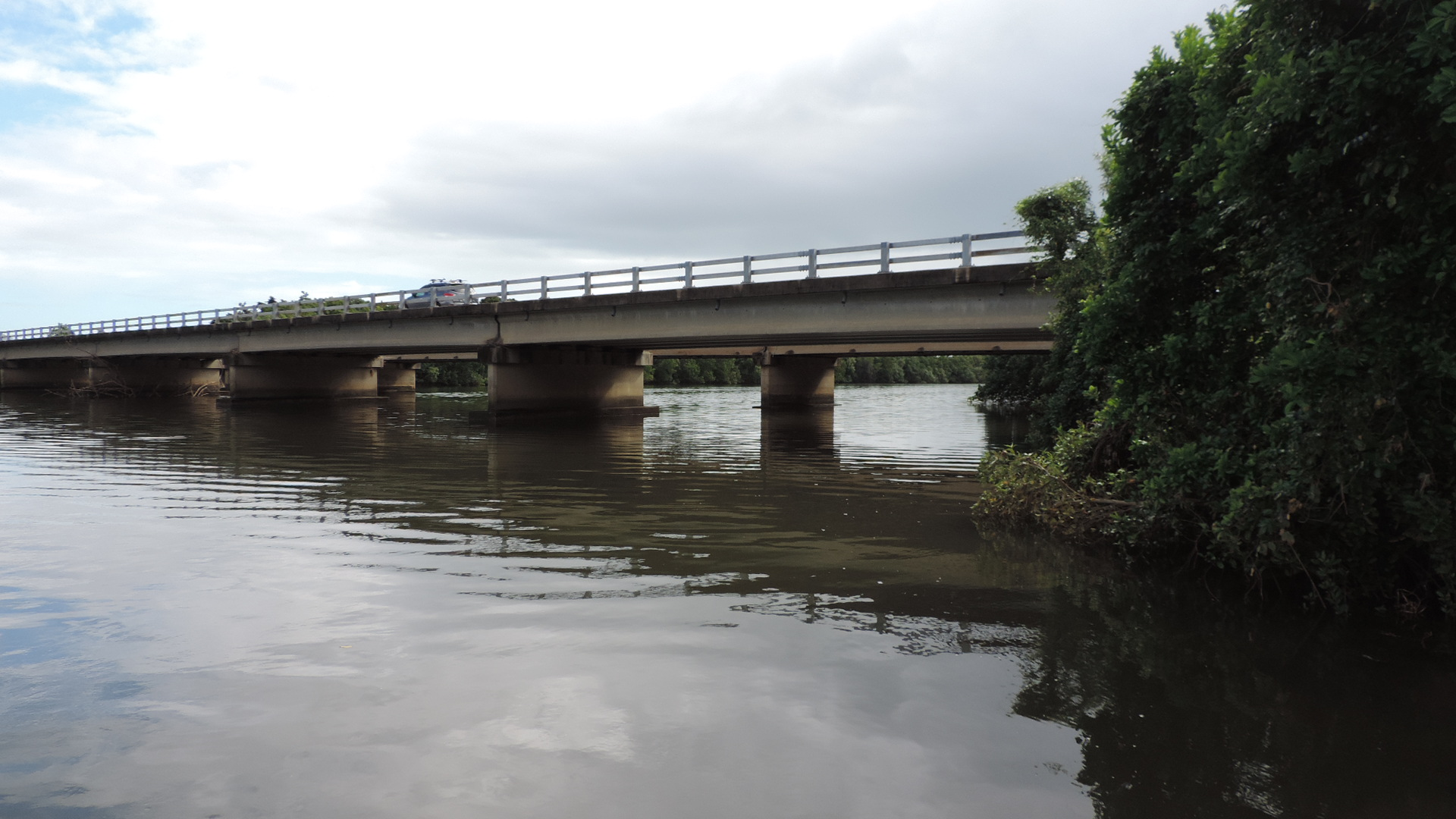
- W W Mason Bridge, as seen from Stratford, 2018
- Coordinates: 16°52′08″S 145°44′10″E
- Carries: Captain Cook Highway (Motor vehicles)
- Crosses: Barron River
- Locale: Stratford, Queensland, Australia
- Official name: William Walter Mason Memorial Bridge
- Other name(s): Barron River Bridge
- Maintained by: Department of Transport and Main Roads

Characteristics
- Design: Beam bridge
- Material: Prestressed concrete
- Total length: 176 metres (577 ft)
- Clearance below: 4.1 metres (13 ft)

History
- Opened: Southbound bridge (16 December 1977); Northbound bridge (1988)
- Replaces: Farmers' Bridge (1921-1929); Stratford Bridge (1934-1978)

The William Walter Mason Memorial Bridge (also known as Barron River Bridge) is a road bridge that carries the Captain Cook Highway across the Barron River at the boundary of four suburbs in Cairns (Stratford, Aeroglen, Barron, and Machans Beach) in the Cairns Region, Queensland, Australia.

The first Barron River Bridge was built by John Holland Constructions in 1977. On 12 August 1978 it was named after William Walter Mason, the first settler who bought land on the north side of the Barron River in 1882.

The first bridge was converted to southbound traffic after the second northbound bridge was built in 1988 as part of the highway duplication project. Both bridges are known as the William Walter Mason Bridges.
