= Richard Morton Machan =

First white settler in Machans Beach, Queensland, Australia

Mr Richard Morton Machan
- Born: 21 February 1865
- Died: 20 June 1941 (aged 76); Cairns
- Burial place: Cairns Cemetery, Cairns Region; Section: MES Row: W3 Site: 4108
- Other name: Richard known as Dick
- Spouse: Christina Suhle Machan (1885–1921) Marriage Registration details: 1902/C/867, marriage date 8 October 1902
- Children: 8

Richard (Dick) Morton Machan was the first white settler in the suburb of far north Queensland now called Machans Beach.

The suburb of Machans Beach and several streets in the Cairns area are named after the Machan family.

Machan purchased 250 acres of land at Machans Beach, then known as Barron Beach, on the 27th March 1924 and settled on the beachfront. Richard and his four children were the first permanent residents of Machans Beach.

Richard Machan’s family lived in the area until 2014.

== Life ==
Machan was born in on 21 Feb 1865 and arrived in Cairns in 1878 with his stepfather, Captain Miller who was the first pilot stationed at Cairns. In his early youth Machan was engaged in driving and employed by the Collinsons (well-known settlers in Far North Queensland). He later went to Georgetown where he was employed for some years on Lyndhurst Station. Lyndhurst is now considered to be a separate suburb. He was later employed at Kidston and many Tableland townships before residing permanently in the Cairns area in 1924.

Machan was described by his grandson as “a bit of an entrepreneur” because of using the opportunity to sell to miners in the local area. Machan discovered this opportunity after working at the Kidston gold mine himself. Machan also had a vegetable garden and was able to sell produce and other tools to the miners. Machan was also involved in hotels in Mareeba, however he moved back to Machans after his wife’s death.

He married Christina Suhle in 8 October 1902. Christina died in 1921. Machan returned to the Cairns area in 1924 where he took up residence in what is now called Machans Beach.

Machan died in the Cairns Hospital in 1941 at the age of 76 after being ill for some months.

== Family ==
Spouse: Christina Suhle Machan (married 1902)

Children:

Susan Jane Machan Zeller, 1903–1999

Evelyn May Machan Radunz, 1909–1995

Richard Morton Machan (Junior) 1911–1983

William Henry Machan, 1914–1945

Thomas Percival Machan, 1917–2007

Jean Machan, 1920–1920

Joan Machan, 1920–1920

Some of the descendants of Mr Machan resided in the Cairns Region including Cairns City, Freshwater, Redlynch, Machans Beach and nearby suburbs. His daughter lived in Cracow. There were descendants in the Machans Beach area until 2014.
