= Redden Island =

Island in Queensland, Australia

Native name: Dungarra
- Location within Australia

Geography
- Location: Oceania
- Coordinates: 16.8557°S 145.7538°E
- Adjacent to: Pacific Ocean

Administration
- Australia

Demographics
- Population: Included as part of Machans Beach population

Additional information
- Time zone: AEST (UTC+10)

Redden Island (known as "Dungarra" to the original inhabitants) is an island in Far North Queensland within the suburb of Machans Beach in Cairns, Australia. It is an important habitat for bird life Including some rare and endangered species. Made up of bushland, mangroves and a beach there are than 200 bird species recorded. It is also a historical landmark in Queensland.

== Geography ==
South of the island is the Barron River, which leads to the Coral Sea. Redden Creek has a bridge across it (Gundy Anton Bridge) to connect it to the mainland and to become part of Machans Beach. The topography is flat and a high diversity of habitats in a relatively small area.

== History ==
The Island was originally named "Dungarra" by the local peoples.

The island is important for conservation history. It is a small pocket of native vegetation that has been largely undeveloped. It was kept as a noise buffer between Machans Beach and the airport.

Gundy (Grozden) Anton donated some of his land to connect the Island with the mainland. He lived until 78 years of age in the suburb. The bridge then called Redden Island Bridge (or Mitchell St Bridge) was later known as Gundy Anton Bridge to reflect the history of the local area.

Volunteers and the Cairns City Council maintain the walking tracks.

== Tourism ==
Walking

There is an area with walking tracks that allow discovery of the local habitats and birds. A small, flat bush walk is accessible via 3 pedestrian gates. In low tide it is also possible to walk onto the sand flats and on the shorelines.

Bird watching

Local birding groups depart from Cairns.

Fishing

Fishing from the bridge or shore is popular.

Beach

Beach walking and walking on the sand flats in low tide. Drones are prohibited in the area because of the proximity to the Cairns Airport.

== Birdlife ==
The Island recorded at least 209 species of birds. The species of birds include some rare and endangered species such as the eastern curlew, the great knot, the curlew sandpiper, the bar-tailed godwit, the red knot, and the lesser sand plover. "Bush chooks" or Orange-footed Megapodes are commonly seen.

== See also ==
Machans Beach
