= Explosives Magazine and Detonator Store, Stratford =

Explosives Magazine and Detonator Store
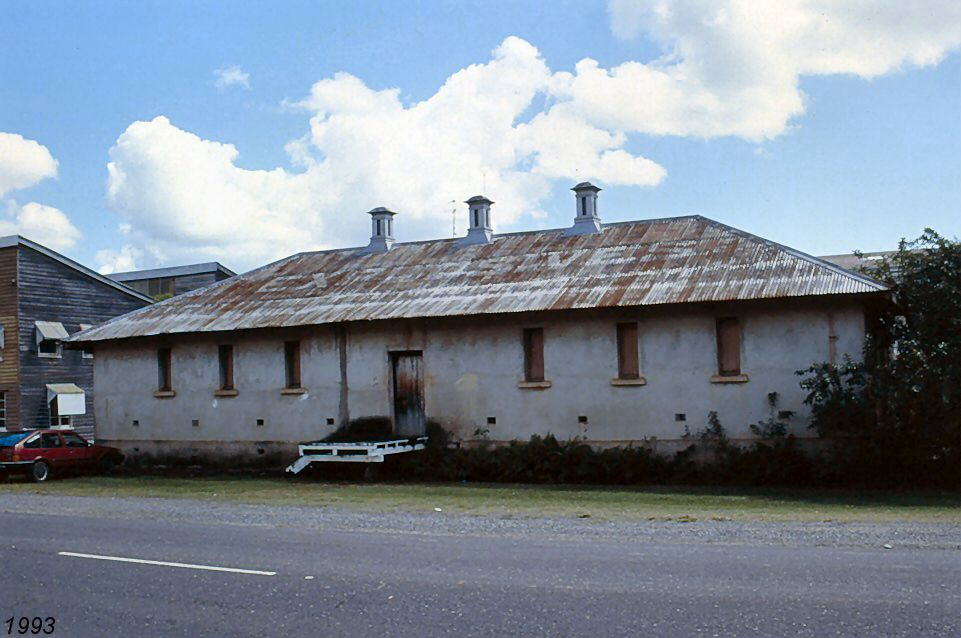
- Former Explosives Magazine and Denonator Store, Stratford, 1993

- Location within Queensland Location within Australia
- 16.8744°S 145.7374°E
- Location: Magazine Street, Stratford, Cairns, Cairns Region, Queensland, Australia

History
- Design period: 1900 - 1914 (early 20th century)
- Built: 1901

Queensland Heritage Register
- Official name: Explosives Magazine and Detonator Store (former), Explosives Magazine and Detonator Store
- Type: state heritage (built)
- Designated: 21 October 1992
- Reference no.: 600754
- Significant period: 1900s (fabric); 1900s-1940s (historical)
- Significant components: shed - detonator, magazine / explosives store
- Builders: JC Thomson

Explosives Magazine and Detonator Store is a heritage-listed former gunpowder magazine at Magazine Street, Stratford, Cairns, Cairns Region, Queensland, Australia. It was built in 1901 by JC Thomson. It was added to the Queensland Heritage Register on 21 October 1992.

== History ==
The powder magazine and detonator store at Stratford, near Cairns, were constructed in 1901 for Queensland Government's Marine Department, which was the government authority responsible for storing the large quantity of explosives, both government and privately owned, being shipped into the port of Cairns at the turn of the century.

From 1860 to 1963, control of all explosives/gunpowder imported into Queensland was the province of the Harbour Master's Department (1860–62), the Department of Ports & Harbours (1862–93), the Marine Department (1894–1928), and the Department of Harbours and Marine (1929–63). In 1964, responsibility was shifted to the Queensland Department of Health. Under The Navigation Act 1876, the master of any ship entering a Queensland port with gunpowder to be unloaded, had to ensure that it was placed in a government magazine. The Ports & Harbours Department therefore was responsible for the provision of magazines and for the safe storage of explosives at Queensland ports of entry. The act further regulated the conveyance and storage of gunpowder in any place in Queensland, not just in the ports.

From the late 1860s, government magazines were being erected at the principal ports and goldfields of Queensland. On the goldfields, magazines were administered by the Mines Department; control of magazines other than in ports was not vested in the Marine Department until 1907, under the provisions of the Explosives Act 1906. These magazines were constructed of stone, brick, timber or iron, largely dependent on the local availability of materials. At some ports, floating magazines were utilised.

By 1900, magazines under the control of the Marine Department were situated at Brisbane, Maryborough, Bundaberg, Gladstone, Rockhampton, Bowen, Townsville, Cairns, Cooktown and Normanton. None of these appears to have been of concrete construction. The magazine at Cairns was a barge, 50 by 16 feet (15.2 by 4.9 m), anchored off the east side of Trinity Inlet since October 1884, and was the reason for the naming of Magazine Creek on that shore.

In mid-1900, the Cairns magazine was receiving explosives at the rate of 2,716 cases per annum, the amount was increasing rapidly, and traders were clamouring for storage space. Explosives were imported to Cairns by Brisbane-based merchants such as Brabant & Co. and Hertzberg & Co., stored at the government magazine at a cost, and then sold to the mining companies and merchants on the Atherton tinfields and Chillagoe copperfields. As well, explosives were used in the construction of the privately funded Mareeba-to-Chillagoe railway, commenced in August 1898. The first stage of this railway was opened in October 1900, opening up new mineral fields and plantations, and creating a greater demand for explosives, in the process.

In consequence of this rapidly increasing demand for explosives, the Marine Department requested in 1900 that a new magazine be constructed at Cairns. A suitable site of nearly 22 acres (8.9 ha) at Stratford was proclaimed a provisional Reserve for Explosives Magazine (R.180) on 30 May 1900. It was five miles from the centre of Cairns, fronted the Cairns-Mareeba Railway (permitting easier distribution of explosives to the hinterland), and was in a sparsely populated area.

Designs for a powder magazine and detonator store, brick with concrete foundations, along with a small timber residence for the magazine keeper, were produced by the Queensland Government Architect's office, and the contract was let to JC Thomson in November 1900. During construction, mass concrete was substituted for brick walls, in consequence of which costs were reduced. The buildings were completed in mid-July 1901, at a cost of £2,471.

The magazine provided storage capacity for over 6,000 cases of explosives, and was described in the Works Department's Annual Report for 1901–02 as containing means of ventilation, lighting, and other provision for safety, in advance of the best structures hitherto erected in Queensland for this particular purpose. Ventilation in the main magazine was supplied by roof ventilators and airholes covered by grates in the thick concrete walls, and the timber floor was built 3 feet (0.91 m) above ground to allow air to circulate beneath. The explosives magazine and detonator store were surrounded by a high fence of galvanised iron, and the reserve was fenced with hardwood posts and rails. In addition, the Railways Department had constructed a loop line and siding to the magazine.

John Miller, who had been amongst the official party which accompanied David Spence to establish the port of Cairns in 1876, was appointed magazine keeper from 1 July 1901. He was succeeded in 1915 by Arthur Howgego, who remained as magazine keeper at Stratford until 1939. During Howgego's time, explosives were despatched mainly to Mount Mulligan, Mount Molloy, Mareeba, Biboohra and other tableland areas.

In 1911 the explosives reserve was extended to 157 acres (64 ha), in anticipation of expanding the magazine facilities at Stratford. Reduced quantities of explosives entering Queensland during the First World War temporarily relieved the necessity for expansion, but in the 1920s, the Stratford magazine was handling substantial volumes of explosives once again. By the late 1920s, the spread of population in the Stratford area around the magazine was a cause of concern to the Chief Inspector of Explosives. In 1931 R.180 was cancelled, and a new reserve of 230 acres (93 ha), further east along the railway line, was proclaimed. Due to budget constraints, however, construction of new magazine facilities was deferred for over a decade, and during the 1930s, the 1901 buildings remained in use on what was by then an unofficial government reserve.

At the outbreak of the Second World War in September 1939, a military guard of 19 men was stationed at the Stratford magazine. By early 1940, the Government had made the decision to erect new magazine facilities, including caretaker's quarters, at Queerah, on the southern outskirts of Cairns. The Queerah magazine buildings were completed in October 1941, and by March 1942, all explosives from the Stratford magazine had been transferred there. The magazine keeper, however, resided at Stratford for the duration of the war, as the military guard were occupying the new caretaker's quarters at Queerah.

From early June 1942 until mid May 1945, the Stratford magazine site was occupied by the Australian Military Forces, who used the concrete buildings to store explosives. During the military occupancy, most of the galvanised iron fence around the magazine buildings was removed.

After the Second World War, the site was utilised as a yard and depot by the Department of Public Works, until in 1953, JM Johnston Pty Ltd, owner of the adjacent sawmill, obtained a thirty year lease of the buildings, on about 5 acres (2.0 ha). JM Johnston Pty Ltd acquired a perpetual lease on the property in 1956, and freehold in 1980.

The former magazine keeper's cottage has been removed from the site.

== Description ==
The former Stratford Explosives Magazine, currently used as a storage facility for the adjoining sawmill, is located on a level site fronting Magazine Street to the south and surrounded by worksheds to the north and west. The magazine consists of two structures, an explosives store and a store for detonators.

The explosives store is a symmetrical, rectangular building with a hipped corrugated iron roof on which the word EXPLOSIVES is still visible. Three square ridge ventilators, in sheet metal decorated with classical mouldings, are prominent on the roof. The walls are of poured in-situ concrete with a concrete render, the base of which sits slightly proud. The walls have numerous vents, with the longer north and south elevations having a central doorway flanked by three narrow windows to each side. The east and west elevations have three narrow windows, and the south entry has a small timber landing. All windows have timber frames, which once housed louvres and a wire screen, with timber shutters to the inside. Externally, both doors were copper sheeted fixed with brass screws. The south door has had the copper sheet removed but the screws remain.

The store for detonators is a small square plan building, with a hipped corrugated iron roof with a square ridge ventilator, located to the east of the explosives store. The walls are of poured in-situ concrete with a concrete render, with a door to the south and a single narrow window to each side. The door and windows are similar to those of the explosives store, but the windows house glass louvres and do not have timber shutters.

Internally, both buildings have boarded ceilings, with the perimeter raked to the exterior walls, with centrally positioned ceiling vents.

The railway line, from which the Explosives Magazine was originally linked via a loop line and siding, is located opposite on the south side of Magazine Street.

== Heritage listing ==
The former Explosives Magazine and Detonator Store was listed on the Queensland Heritage Register on 21 October 1992 having satisfied the following criteria.

The place is important in demonstrating the evolution or pattern of Queensland's history.

The former Explosives Magazine and Detonator Store at Stratford is important in demonstrating the pattern of Queensland's history, being closely associated with the economic development of the Cairns hinterland in the early decades of the 20th century, and in particular with the expansion of railways and mining in the district.

The place is important in demonstrating the principal characteristics of a particular class of cultural places.

The place is important in demonstrating the principal characteristics of a substantial, early 1900s explosives magazine and detonator store constructed in concrete, and illustrates c. 1900 techniques for the ventilation of explosives magazines.

The place is important because of its aesthetic significance.

The place is important in exhibiting a range of aesthetic characteristics valued by the local community, in particular its contribution through scale, form and materials, to the Stratford townscape, its utilitarian nature, and the intactness of the structures.
