= Aeroglen =

- Suburb
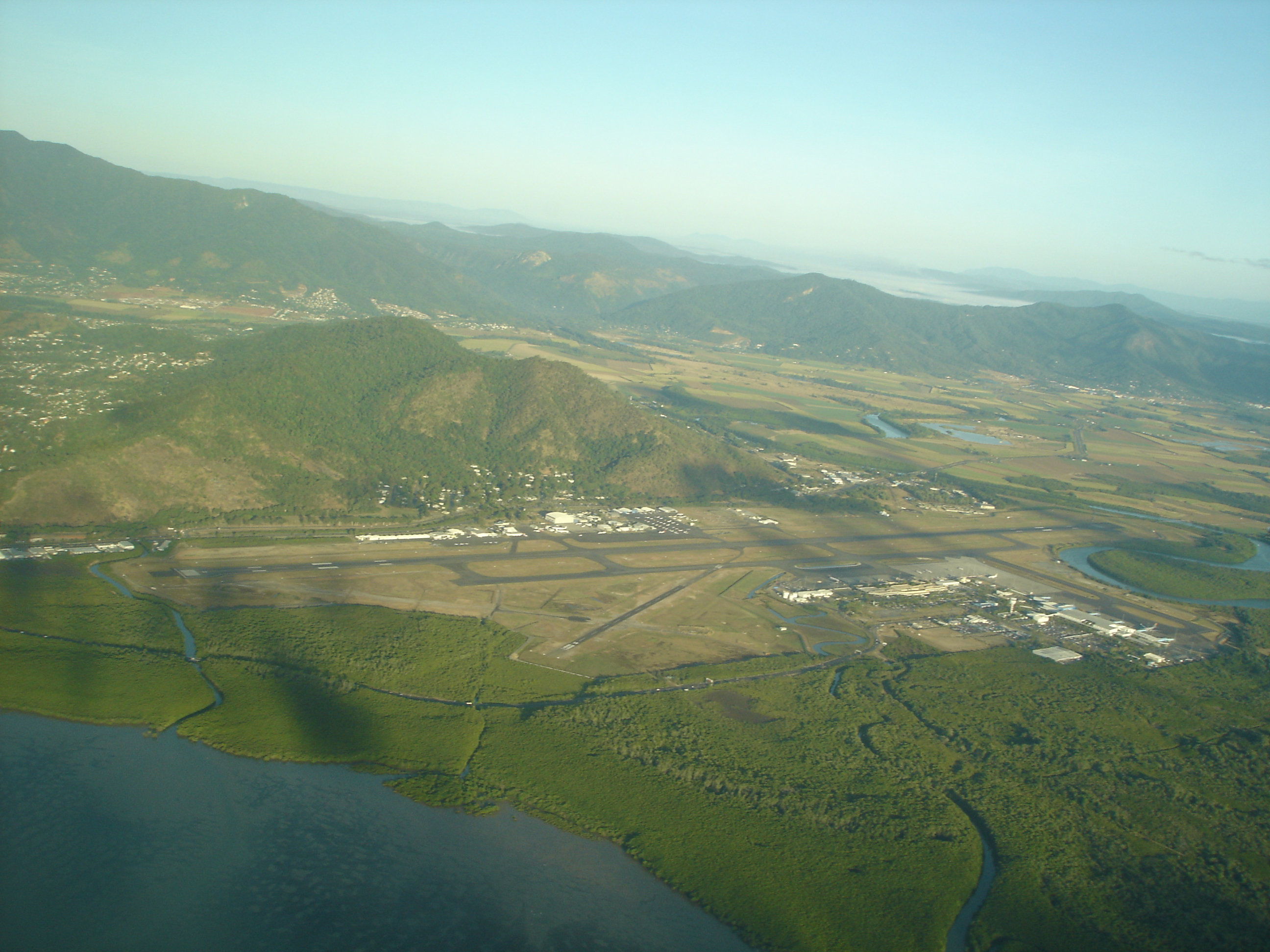
- Aeroglen and Cairns Airport with Mount Whitfield directly behind it, as seen from the Coral Sea

- Interactive map of Aeroglen
- Coordinates: 16.8761°S 145.7597°E
- Country: Australia
- State: Queensland
- City: Cairns
- LGA: Cairns Region
- Location: 3.8 km (2.4 mi) NW of Edge Hill; 5.7 km (3.5 mi) NW of Cairns CBD; 1,687 km (1,048 mi) NNW of Brisbane

Government
  - State electorate: Cairns
  - Federal division: Leichhardt

Area
  - Total: 13.8 km^{2} (5.3 sq mi)

Population
  - Total: 405 (2021 census)
  - Density: 29.35/km^{2} (76.0/sq mi)
- Time zone: UTC+10:00 (AEST)
- Postcode: 4870
Suburbs around Aeroglen
Barron	Machans Beach	Coral Sea
Stratford	Aeroglen	Coral Sea
Whitfield	Cairns North	Coral Sea

Aeroglen is a coastal suburb of Cairns in the Cairns Region, Queensland, Australia. It is approximately 5 kilometers (3 miles) north of the Cairns City centre. In the 2021 census, Aeroglen had a population of 405 people.

== Geography ==
The suburb is bounded to the north by the Barron River, to the east by the Coral Sea, to the south by Lily Creek, and to the west loosely by the Captain Cook Highway but with one small pocket of housing to the west of the highway.

Aeroglen is located on a slope at the foot of the Mount Whitfield Conservation Park.

The Captain Cook Highway enters the suburb from the south (Cairns North) and exits to the north-west (Barron / Machans Beach).

The Tablelands railway line also enters the suburb from the south (Cairns North), immediately west of the highway and exits to the west (Stratford). The suburb was served by the Aeroglen railway station (16.8854°S 145.7475°E), but it is now abandoned.

Most of the suburb is taken up by the Cairns International Airport (16.8773°S 145.7567°E) which lies between the highway and the Coral Sea.

== History ==
Aeroglen is situated in the Yidinji traditional Aboriginal country.

Aeroglen was named prior to 1939 because of the proximity to the historical aerodrome, which was purchased by the Australian Government in 1937. The area was previously known as Quarry Siding.

== Demographics ==
In the 2011 census, Aeroglen had a population of 403 people.

In the 2016 census, Aeroglen had a population of 403 people. 77.6% of people were born in Australia and 86.8% of people only spoke English at home. The most common response for religion in Aeroglen was No Religion at 38.2% of the population.

In the 2021 census, Aeroglen had a population of 405 people.

== Education ==
There are no schools in Aeroglen. The nearest government primary schools are Edge Hill State School in Edge Hill to the south-west, Freshwater State School in Freshwater to the west, and Machans Beach State School in neighbouring Machans Beach to the north. The nearest government secondary school is Cairns State High School in neighbouring Cairns North to the south.
