= Holloways Beach, Queensland =

Holloways Beach
- Suburb
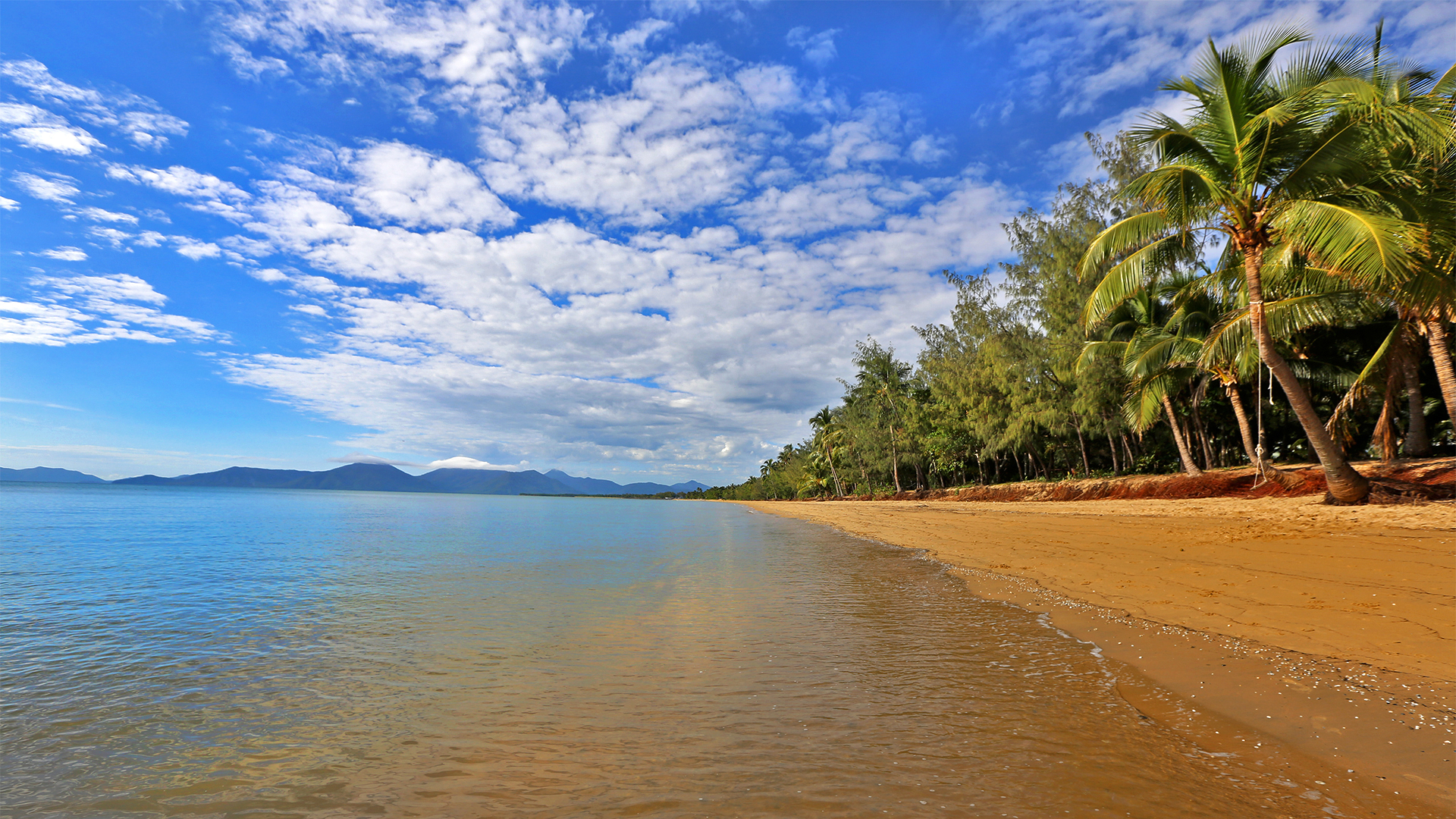
- Holloways Beach

- Interactive map of Holloways Beach
- Coordinates: 16.8383°S 145.7319°E
- Country: Australia
- State: Queensland
- City: Cairns
- LGA: Cairns Region
- Location: 11.2 km (7.0 mi) N of Cairns CBD; 356 km (221 mi) NNW of Townsville; 1,689 km (1,049 mi) NNw of Brisbane

Government
  - State electorate: Barron River
  - Federal division: Leichhardt

Area
  - Total: 7.9 km^{2} (3.1 sq mi)

Population
  - Total: 2,398 (2021 census)
  - Density: 303.5/km^{2} (786/sq mi)
- Time zone: UTC+10:00 (AEST)
- Postcode: 4878
Suburbs around Holloways Beach
Yorkeys Knob	Yorkeys Knob	Coral Sea
Barron	Holloways Beach	Coral Sea
Barron	Machans Beach	Machans Beach

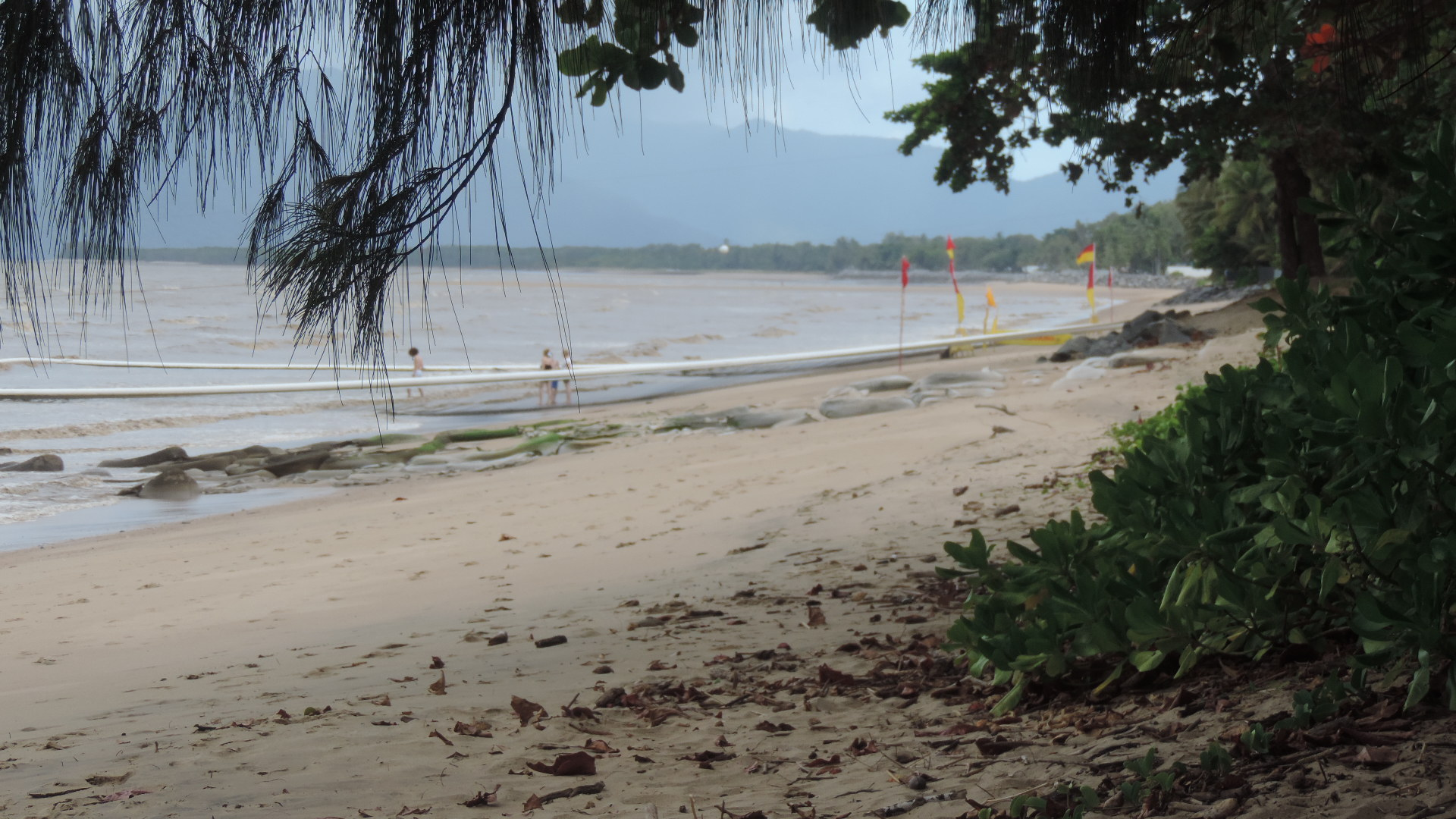
Beach, with signs of erosion, 2018

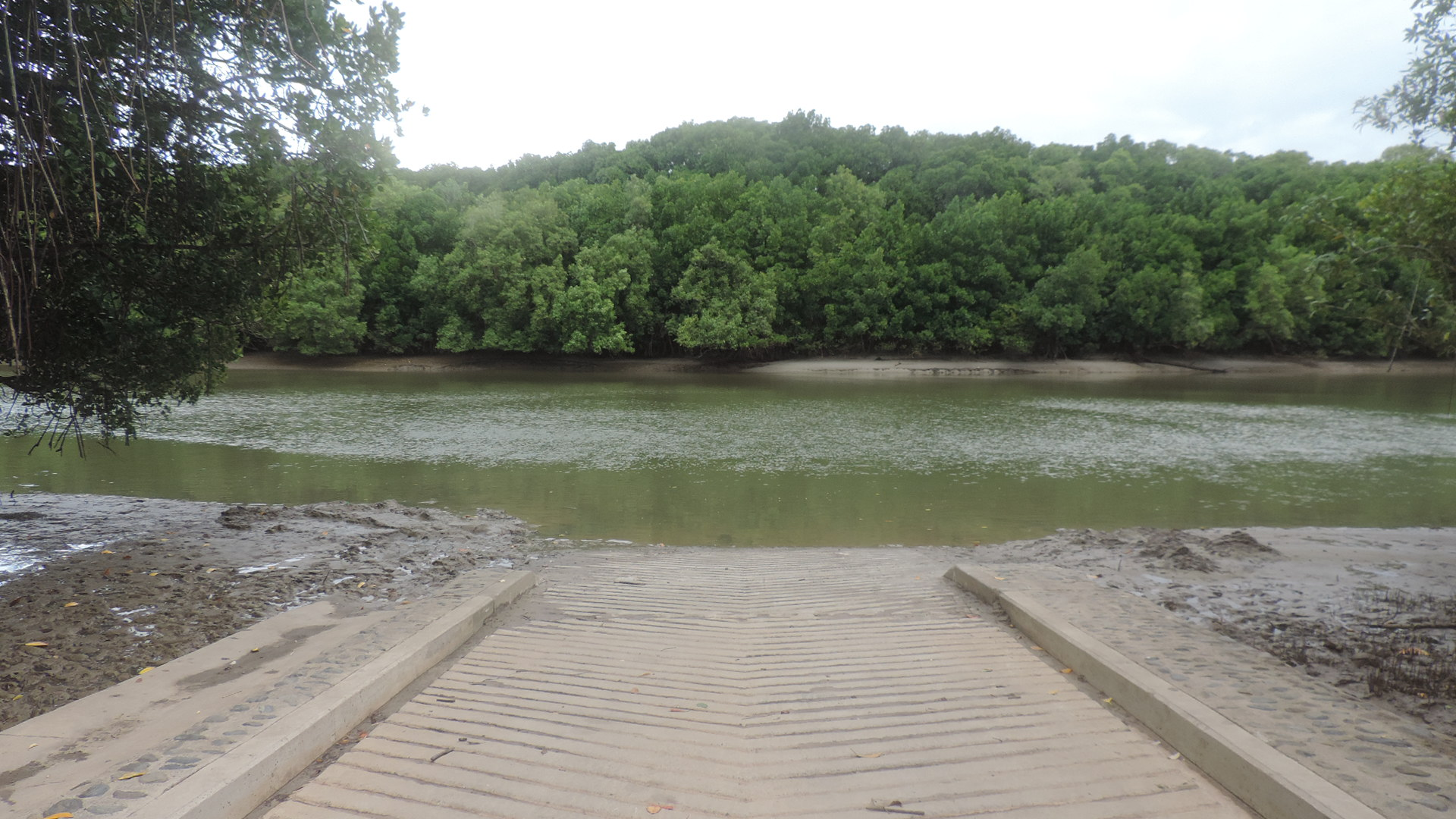
Boat ramp into Richters Creek, 2018

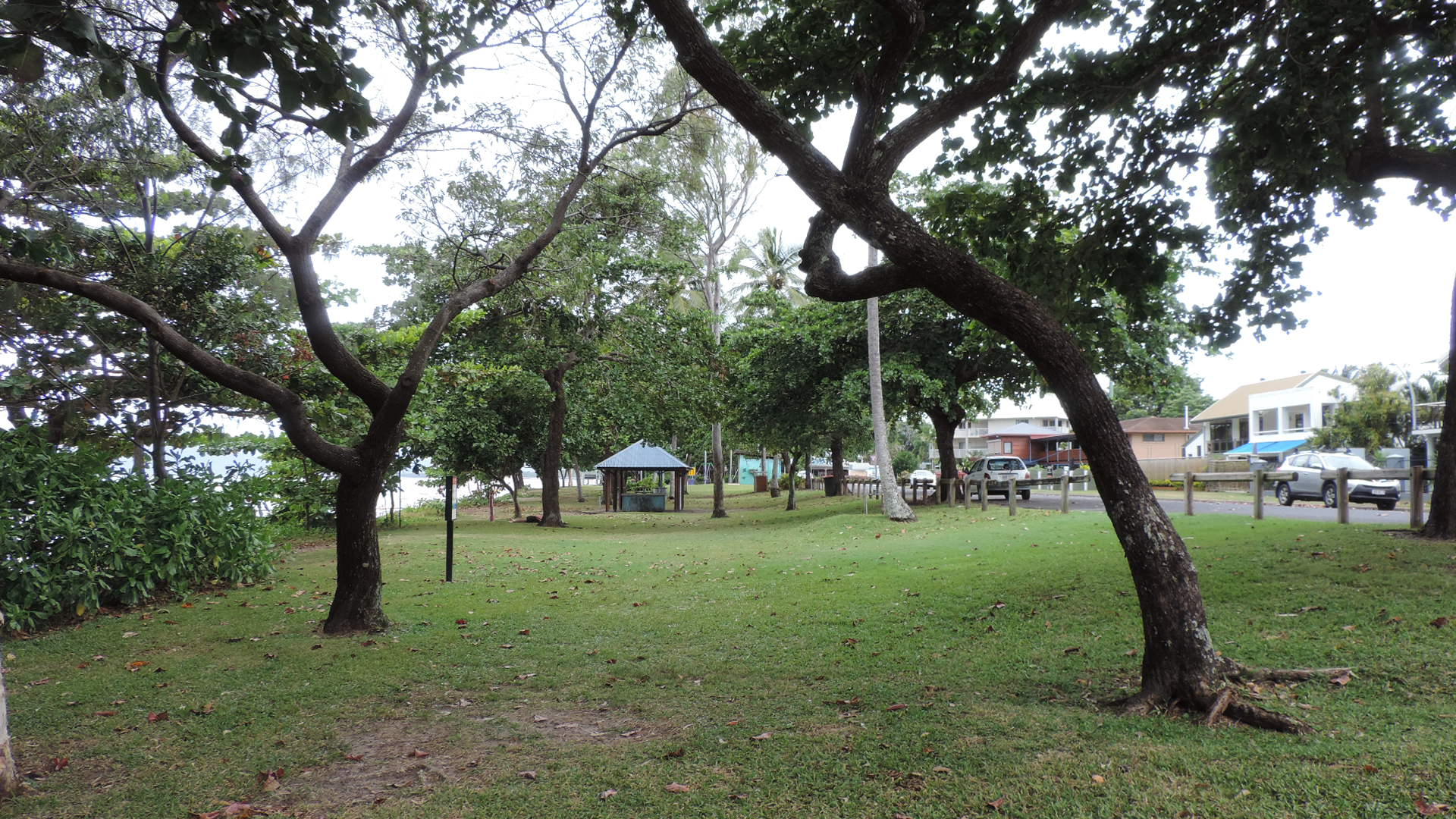
Picnic shelters in the foreshore park, 2018

Holloways Beach is a northern coastal suburb of Cairns, Queensland, Australia. It is located about 10 kilometres north of the city of Cairns between the suburbs of Machans Beach and Yorkeys Knob. In the 2021 census, Holloways Beach had a population of 2,398 people.

Holloways Beach is impacted by noise from Cairns International Airport, which keeps real estate prices in check. From October 2023 to September 2024 the median price for houses has been $587,500 and for units $281,500. In 2022 the values were $540,000 and $259,000 respectively. However, waterfront properties come also here at a premium, with house well above the million dollar mark.

== Geography ==
The southeastern border with Machans Beach roughly follows Barr Creek, the opposite northwestern border with Yorkeys Knob is formed by Richter Creek. The southwestern border with the suburb of Barron follows the Captain Cook Highway. Directly on the other side of the highway is a sand quarry. The northeastern border is formed by the beach from which the suburb derives its name. It is approximately 1.8 kilometres long. About midpoint on the beach there is a stinger-resistant swimming enclosure. Stingers, more formally known as box jellyfish, pose a danger in the first half of the calendar year.

The beach s subject to heavy erosion. Since ca. 2020 several million dollars have been invested to save the beach. This includes the creation of two 30-metre rock groynes. This has not helped a lot, therefore more money is spent to replace the sand ("sand nourishment").

On the coast the land-use is mostly residential. From about 1300 metres inland farming is predominant.

== History ==
Holloways Beach is situated in the traditional Djabugay (Tjapukai) Aboriginal country.

Richard Holloway came to Cairns in 1910 and was farming in the area in 1926. The area was officially named Holloway in 1951 by the Queensland Surveyor-General, renamed Holloway Beach in 1971 and then Holloways Beach in 1981. In 2002, the area was gazetted as a suburb of Cairns rather than as a rural locality.

Land was acquired in October 1951 for a school. However, in December 1951, a school bus service was established to take the students to Cairns Intermediate School and Cairns North State School. In October 1954, the Queensland Government allocated £2341 to relocate Woree's school buildings to Holloway's Beach and then repair and repaint the buildings. Holloway's Beach State School opened on 23 May 1955. It closed on 13 June 1966.

== Demographics ==
In the 2016 census, the suburb of Holloways Beach had a population of 2,347 people.

In the 2021 census, the suburb of Holloways Beach had a population of 2,398 people.

== Education ==
There are no schools in Holloways Beach. The nearest government primary schools are Machans Beach State School in neighbouring Machans Beach to the south-east and Caravonica State School in Caravonica to the south-west. The nearest government secondary schools are Smithfield State High School in Smithfield to the north-west and Cairns State High School in Cairns North to the south-east.

Holloways Beach has also an Environmental Education Centre. Operated by the Queensland Department of Education, it provides residential and day visit facilities for outdoor and environmental programs.

== Amenities ==
Holloways Beach is served by a convenience store on Holloways Beach Road. The closest major shopping centre is in Smithfield.

Holloways Beach has a Community Hall capable of seating up to 80 people.

A boat ramp into Richters Creek on the northern boundary of the suburb at Acacia Street is managed by the Cairns Regional Council. There are warning signs about crocodiles near the boat ramp.

The Holloways Beach SES Group meets at the Syd and Jane Granville Memorial Park in Cassia Street.
