= Freshwater railway station, Queensland =

Railway station in Australia

Freshwater
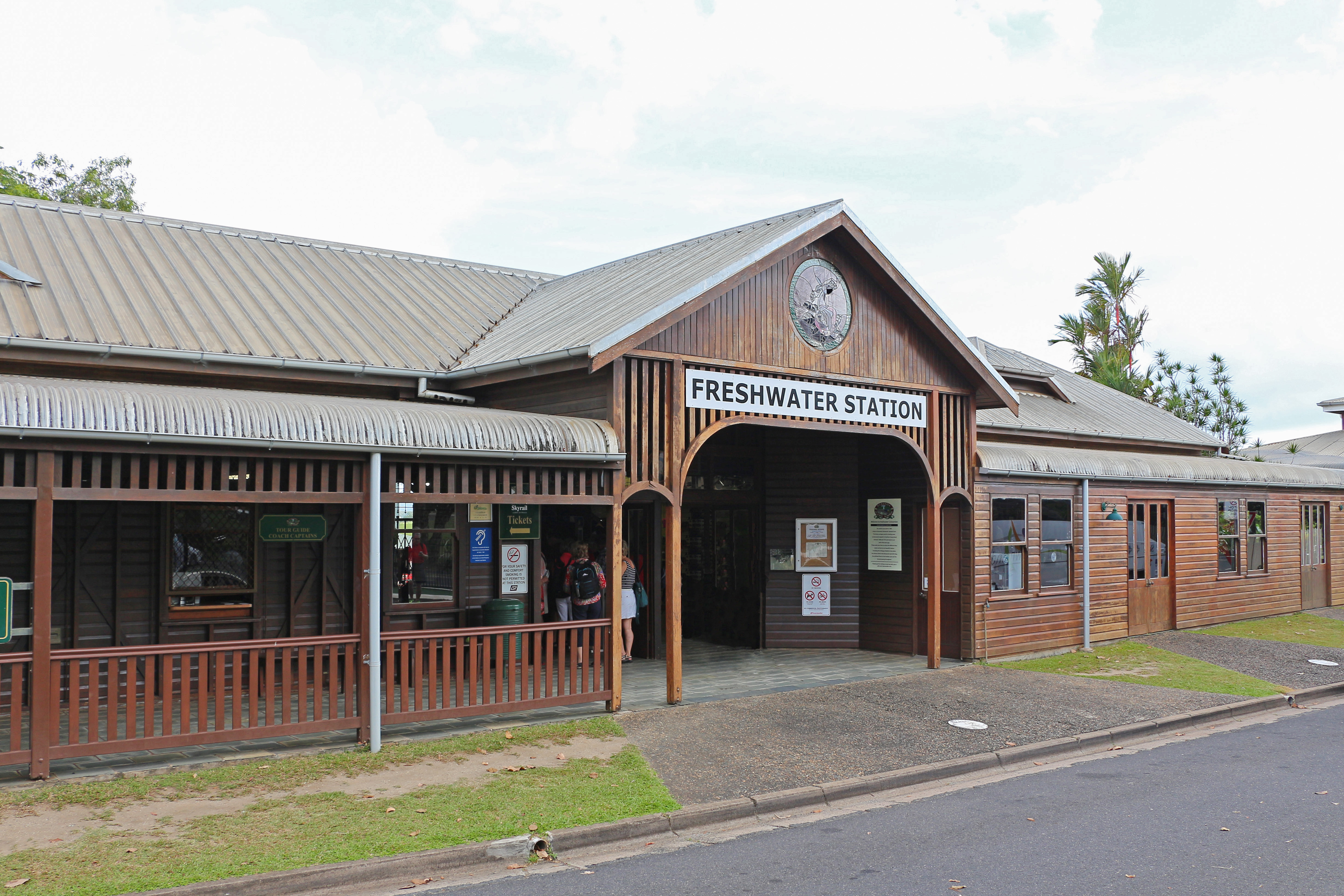
- Freshwater railway station, 2015

General information
- Location: Kamerunga Road, Barron, Cairns; Cairns Region, Queensland; Australia
- Coordinates: 16.8811°S 145.7100°E
- Owner: Queensland Rail
- Operator: Queensland Rail
- Lines: Tablelands; Kuranda
- Platforms: 1
- Tracks: 1

Construction
- Structure type: ground

History
- Rebuilt: 2018

Passengers
- 2018: 240,000 annually

Services
Preceding station	Queensland Rail	Following station
Cairns Terminus	Kuranda Scenic Railway	Kuranda Terminus
Location
- Location within Queensland

Freshwater railway station is on the Cairns-to-Kuranda railway line (part of the Tablelands railway line) in Queensland, Australia. It is located at Kamerunga Road, Barron in Cairns (just across the boundary from the suburb of Freshwater).

== Services ==
Although located in the suburb of Barron, it does not currently provide any commuter services. It is only used by Kuranda Scenic Railway tourist service which stops at this station and approximately 60% of the annual 400,000 tourists board the scenic railway service at this station.

== History ==
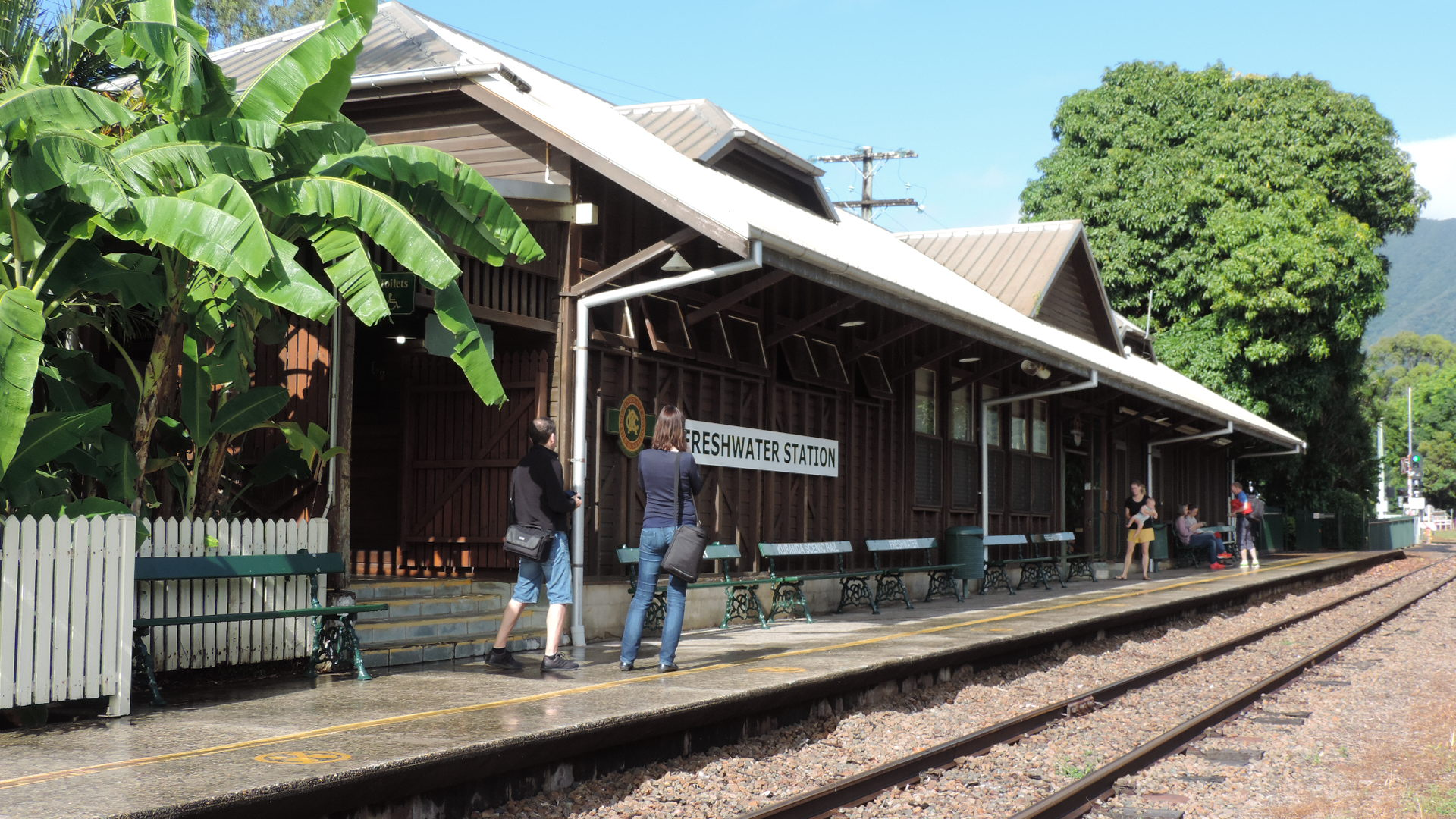
Freshwater railway station, trackside, 2018

The Tablelands railway line was built to provide transport between the mines near Herberton and the Cairns Port. The contract for the first 8 miles from Cairns railway station to Redlynch railway station (passing through Freshwater) was opened on 8 October 1887. During the construction of the line, in March 1887, heavy rain caused the flooding of Freshwater Creek; at the point where the railway line crossed the creek, there was 8 feet (2.4 m) of water over the line. Shortly after the line was opened, further heavy rains damaged the approaches to the railway bridge over Freshwater Creek. Another 8 feet (2.4 m) of flooding occurred again at the Freshwater Creek crossing in January 1888.

When the railway line opened, there were a number of railway sidings along the line: Stratford (5 miles from Cairns), Lily Bank (6 miles from Cairns), and Richmond (7 miles from Cairns). Richmond Siding was renamed Freshwater Siding in January 1890. The development of the railway line had encouraged land developers to release land subdivision called Richmond Park Estate which was sold from 1886 with advertising featuring the forthcoming Richmond Park railway station and its ten minute rail journey to Cairns; this explains the original name of the siding.

In September 2018, a $4.8 million refurbishment was completed at Freshwater station. The work included extending the station platform to provide access to all 15 passager carriages on the Kuranda Scenic Rail service, improving bus and car parking facilities and additional facilities to assist disabled passengers. Besides improving the coach and bus interchange, a new covered walkway was built from the interchange to the station.
