= Machans Beach, Queensland =

Machans Beach
- Suburb
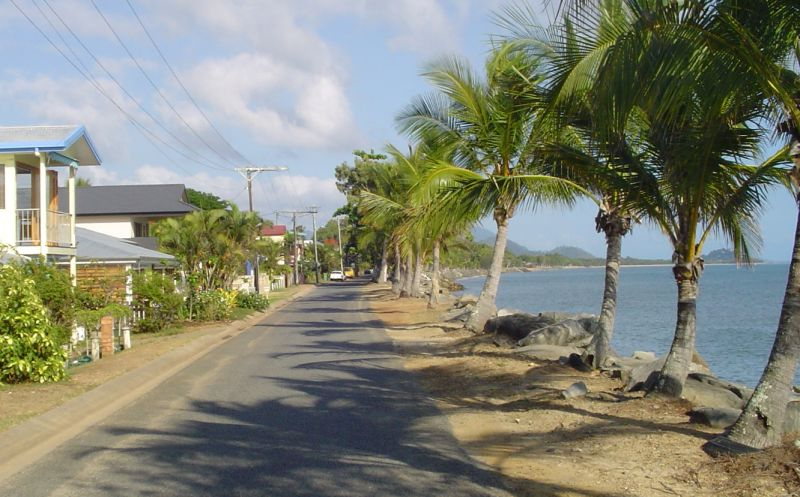
- Esplanade 2005

- Interactive map of Machans Beach
- Coordinates: 16.8555°S 145.7477°E
- Country: Australia
- State: Queensland
- City: Cairns
- LGA: Cairns Region
- Location: 9.9 km (6.2 mi) N of Cairns CBD; 357 km (222 mi) N of Townsville; 1,709 km (1,062 mi) NNW of Brisbane
- Established: 1885

Government
  - State electorate: Barron River
  - Federal division: Leichhardt

Area
  - Total: 7.1 km^{2} (2.7 sq mi)

Population
  - Total: 943 (2021 census)
  - Density: 132.8/km^{2} (344.0/sq mi)
- Time zone: UTC+10:00 (AEST)
- Postcode: 4878
Suburbs around Machans Beach
Holloways Beach	Coral Sea.	Coral Sea
Barron	Machans Beach	Coral Sea
Stratford	Aeroglen	Aeroglen

Machans Beach is a beach and coastal suburb of Cairns in the Cairns Region, Queensland, Australia. In the 2021 census, Machans Beach had a population of 943 people.

== Geography ==
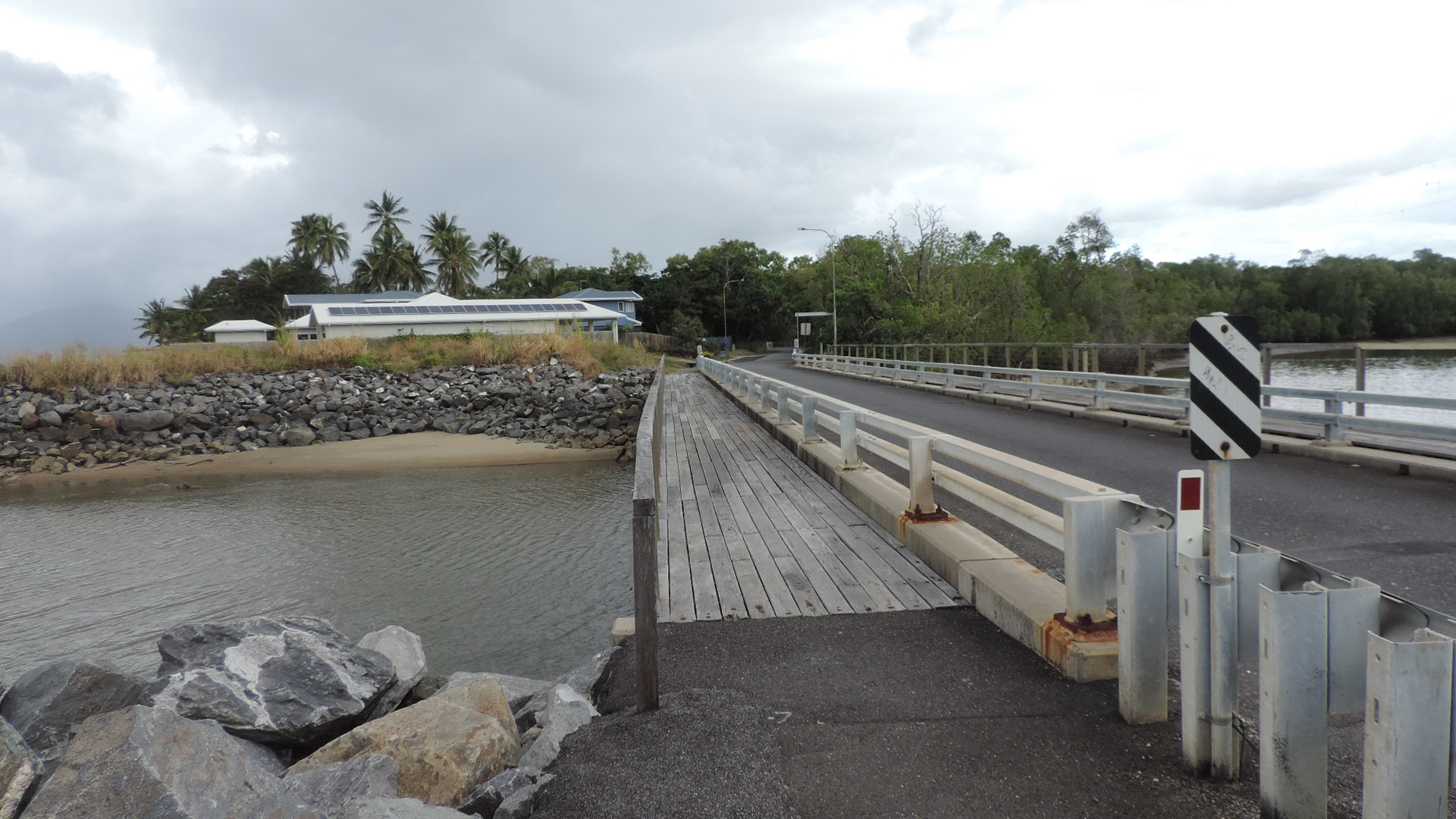
Gundy Anton Bridge from Machans Beach over Redden Creek to Redden Island, 2018

The Barron River and Barr Creek are respectively the southern and northern boundaries of the suburb, while the Coral Sea and Captain Cook Highway form the eastern and western boundaries.

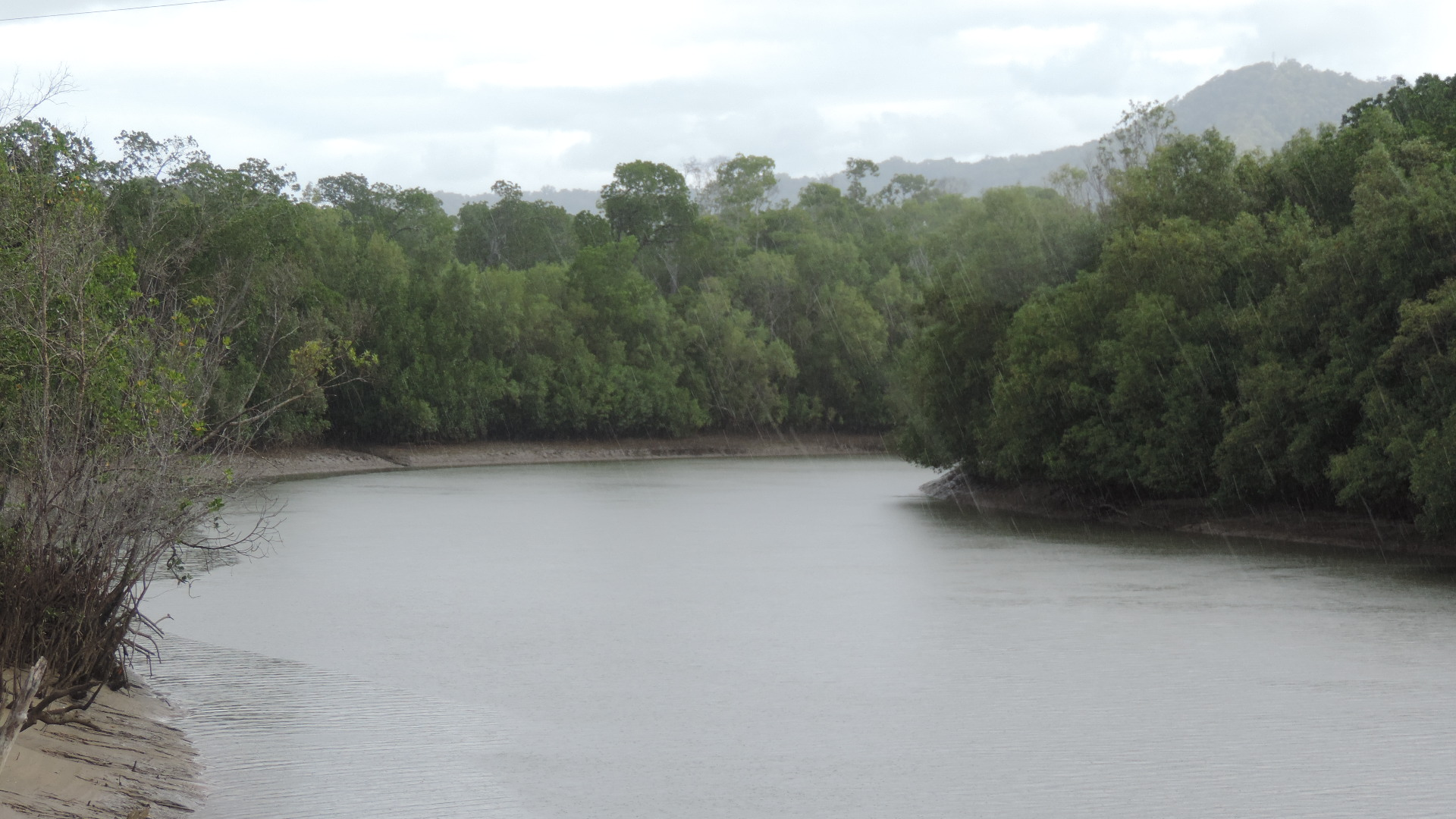
Looking upstream on Redden Creek (offshoot of the Barron River), 2018

The land is flat and just above sea level. The residential development is in the east of the suburb near the coast. The north-eastern coastline is a rocky sea wall, but the south-eastern coastline has a sand beach with the two sections separated by Redden Creek, which flows from the Barron River as a second mouth on the Coral Sea, creating an area known as Redden Island. The Gundy Anton Bridge crosses Redden Creek to connect the mainland part of Machans Beach with Redden Island.

Redden Island is an important habit and feeding ground for shorebirds with over 200 species of bird being recorded there, including some rare and endangered species such as the eastern curlew, the great knot, the curlew sandpiper, the bar-tailed godwit, the red knot, and the lesser sand plover. These migratory shorebirds travel up to 25,000 km each year on their migration between Australian and Asia, some travelling as far north as Siberia and Japan.

The majority of the suburb is still used as freehold farming land with sugarcane the predominant crop.

Machans Beach is impacted by noise from Cairns International Airport. From August 2023 to July 2024 the median price for houses was $501,500, but waterfront properties can cost over one million dollars.

== History ==
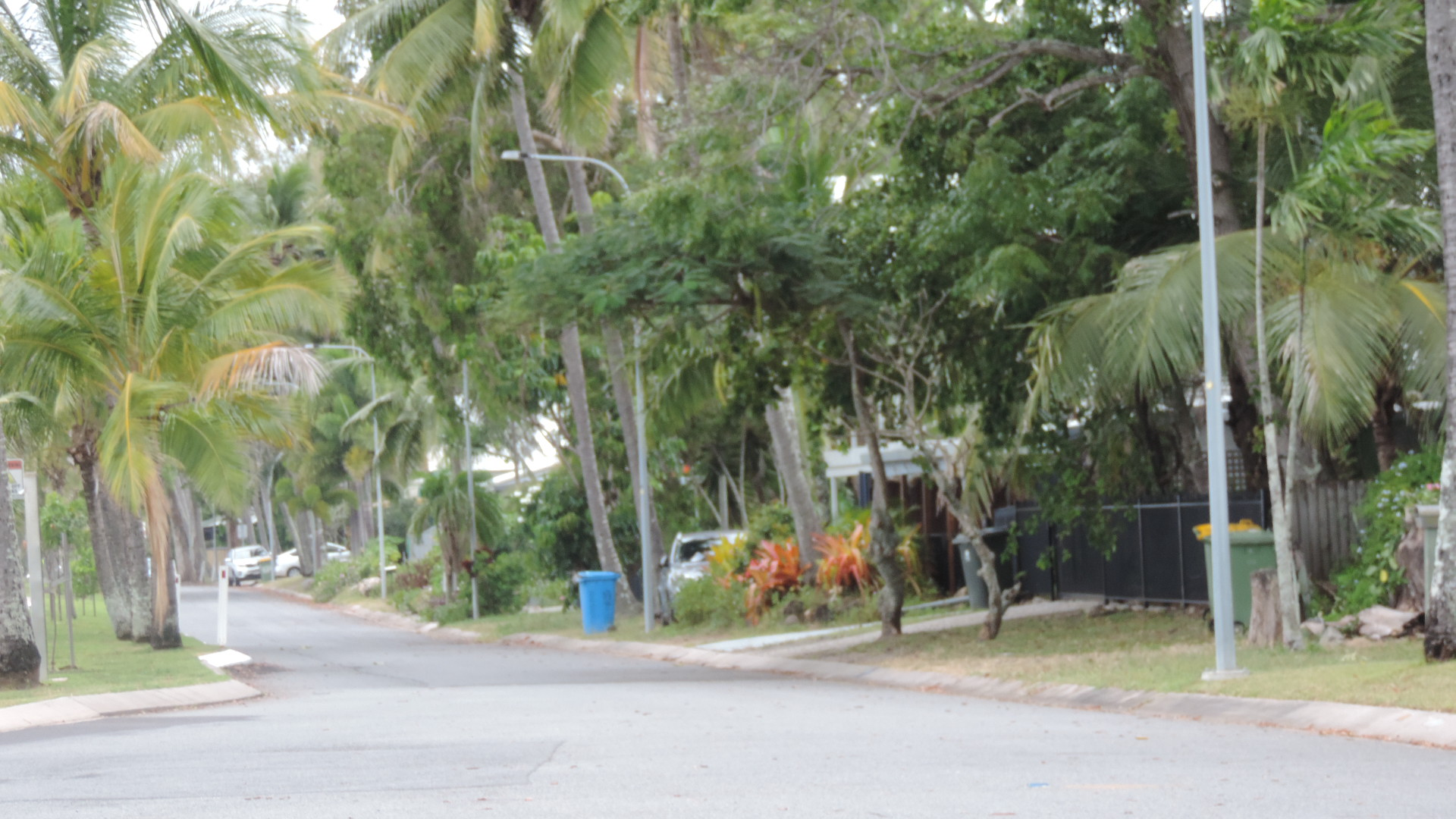
Looking south along the esplanade, 2018

The Yirrganydji people (Tjapukai) traditionally inhabited the area. They used dugouts (single outrigger canoes) for fishing. From the canoes they used spears to catch smaller fish and harpoons to catch large sea creatures such as dugong and turtle. In sheltered creeks, the Yirrganydji people established fish traps, fences of lawyer vine and bushes spread across the creek held in position in the creek by a series of stakes. The women would drive the fish into the traps by beating on the water. Some men pulled on the sides of the fish trap to hold it tight while other men speared the fish driven into the trap. According to traditional lore, if a sea snake was caught, it had to be released or else there would be huge storms.

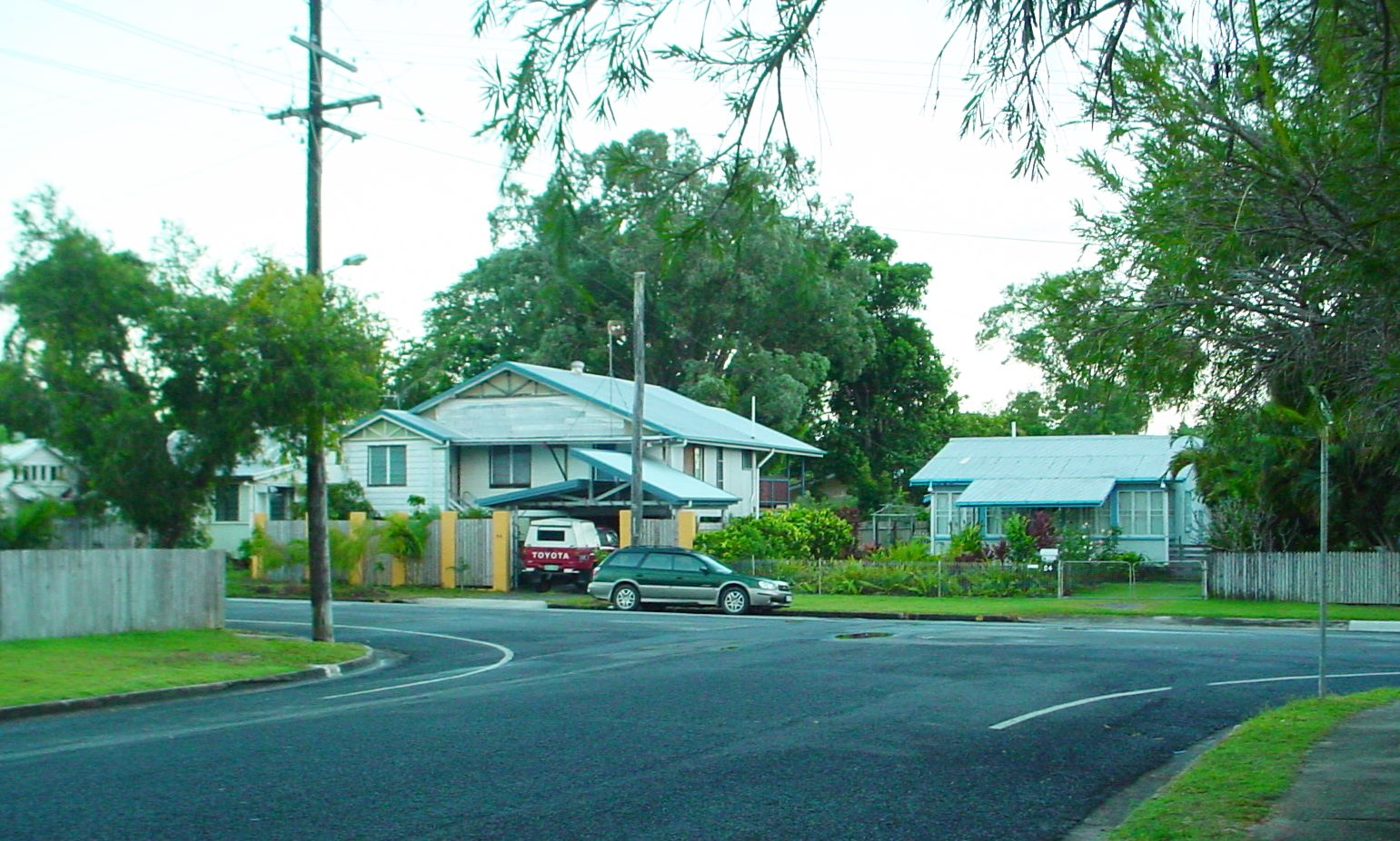
Older homes, 2018

The area was first surveyed in 1885, but was not permanently settled until the 1920s. It is named after Richard Morton Machan who was among the first permanent white settlers in the area, having purchased land in the 1920s. Using a Model T Ford, Richard Machan provided transportation services to the area. He built a jetty to encourage tourist boats from Cairns to call at nearby Barron Beach.

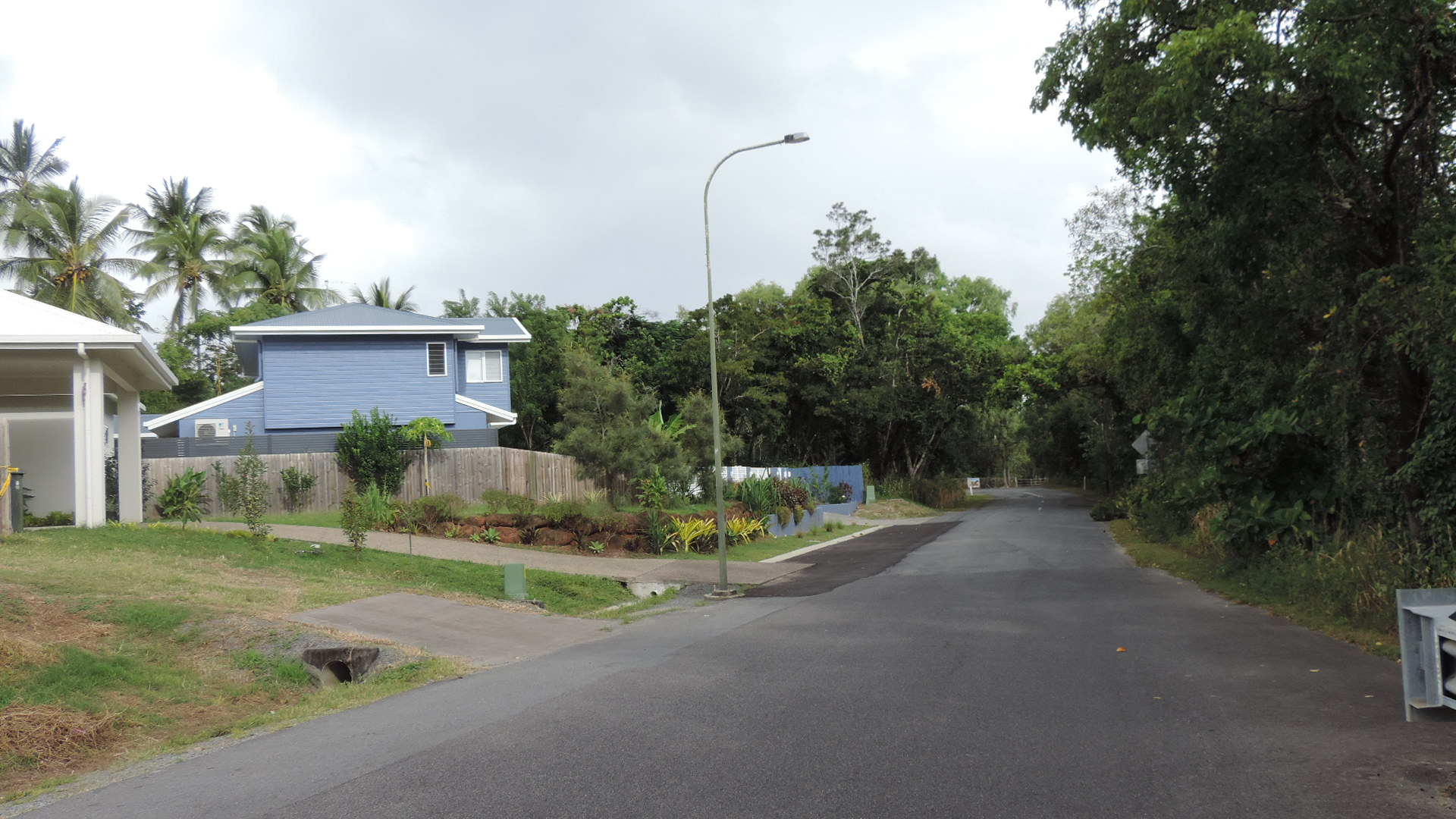
New homes on Redden Island, 2018

Machans Beach State School opened on 4 February 1952.

In 1961, Gundy Anton donated part of his land for use in constructing a bridge across Redden Creek to Redden Island. In 2006, the council approved a local community proposal that the bridge (then known as the Redden Island Bridge) be renamed the Gundy Anton Bridge to reflect both the donation of the land and the considerable community service performed by Anton over the years.

Machans Beach was gazetted as a suburb in 2002, having previously been a locality.

Machans Beach is located about 1 to 2 kilometres (0.62 to 1.24 mi) north of the Cairns International Airport. Plans to extend the airport in 2011 raised a number of objections from Machans Beach residents in relation to environmental concerns and noise concerns.

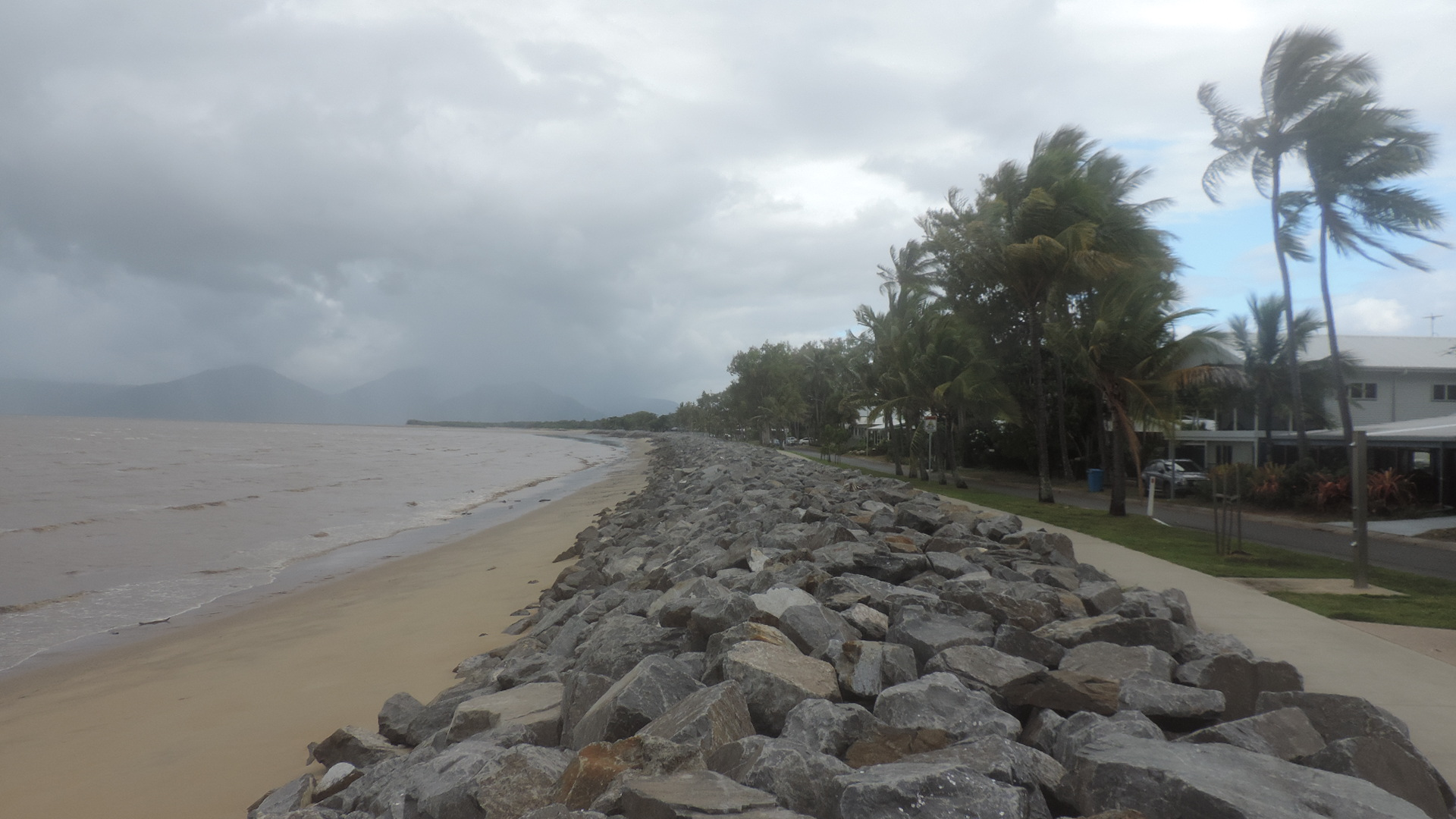
Looking south along the sea wall, 2018

The coastline and waterways in the area are unstable due to storm surge and flooding, which have changed the course of the Barron River over the years. From April 2014 to August 2015, the crumbling seawall along the suburb's northern coastline was rebuilt combined with the construction of a causeway further out to sea to provide greater protection for the growing number of residences along the coastal area following a number of severe storms. The project cost the Cairns Regional Council $16.8M. The drawback of the seawall is that it prevents a sandy beach from forming.

== Demographics ==
In the 2011 census, Machans Beach had a population of 941 people.

In the 2016 census, Machans Beach had a population of 1,051 people.

In the 2021 census, Machans Beach had a population of 943 people.

== Education ==
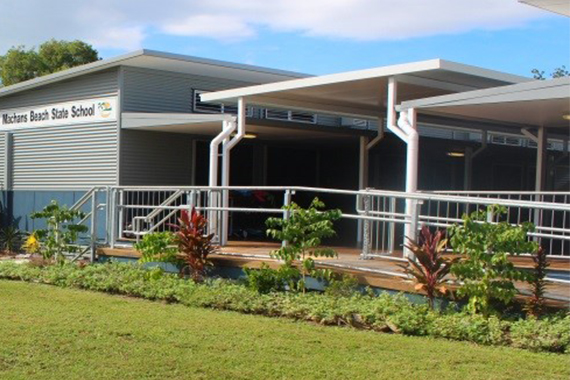
Machans Beach State School, 2023

Machans Beach State School is a government primary (Prep-6) school for boys and girls at 61 Machan Street (16.8526°S 145.7449°E). In 2018, the school had an enrolment of 116 students with 10 teachers (8 full-time equivalent) and 8 non-teaching staff (4 full-time equivalent).

There are no secondary schools in Machans Beach. The nearest government secondary school is Cairns State High School in Cairns North to the south.
