= Barron, Queensland =

Barron Cairns, Queensland
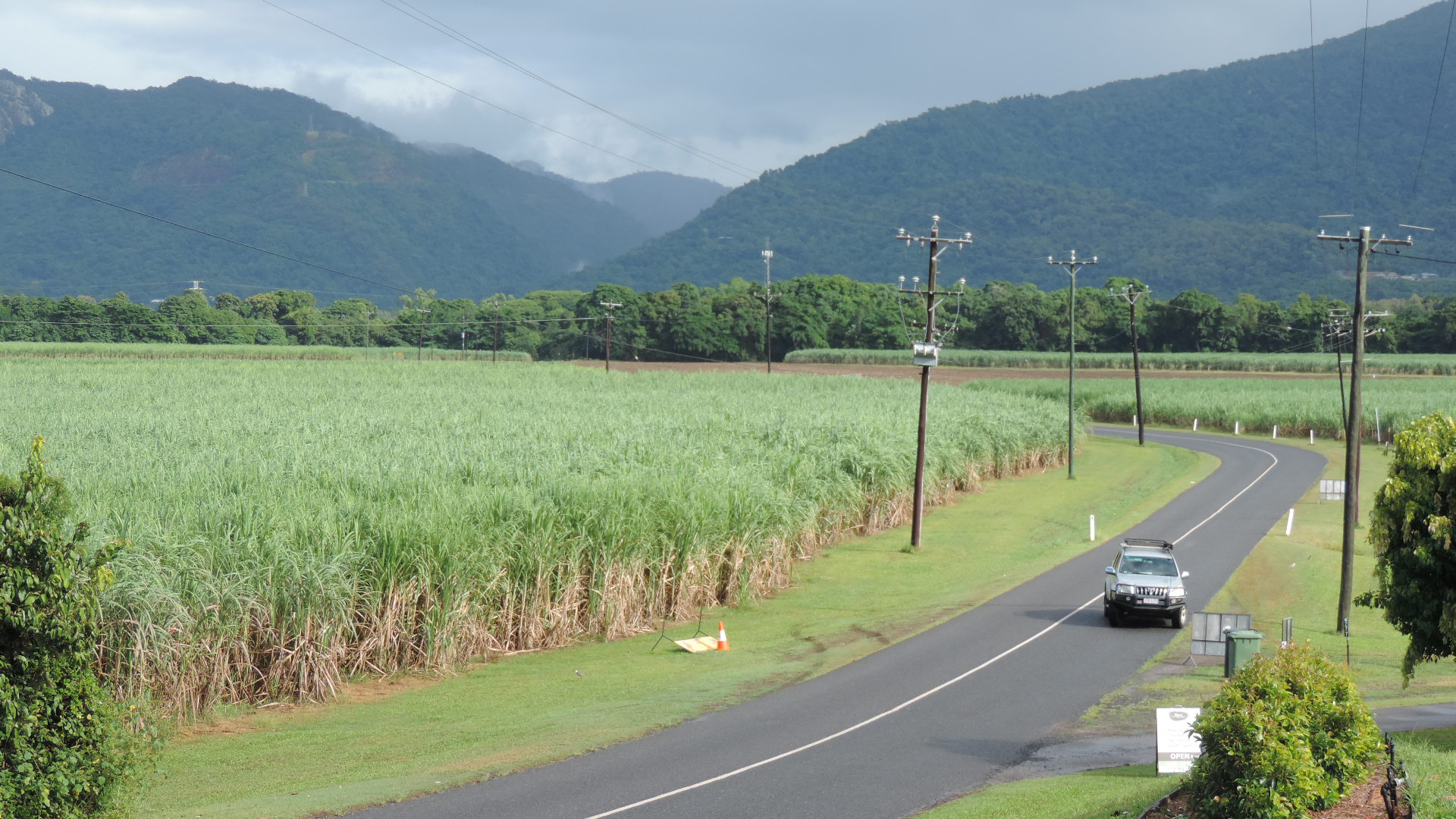
- Sugar cane fields with mountains beyond, Lower Freshwater Road, Barron, 2018

- Coordinates: 16.8655°S 145.71°E
- Population: 68 (2021 census)
  - Density: 5.81/km^{2} (15.05/sq mi)
- Area: 11.7 km^{2} (4.5 sq mi)
- Time zone: AEST (UTC+10:00)
- Location: 10.6 km (7 mi) NW of Cairns CBD; 1,684 km (1,046 mi) NNW of Brisbane
- LGA(s): Cairns Region
- State electorate(s): Barron River
- Federal division(s): Leichhardt
Suburbs around Barron:
Smithfield	Yorkeys Knob	Holloways Beach
Caravonica	Barron	Machans Beach
Kamerunga	Freshwater	Aeroglen; Stratford

Barron is a suburb of Cairns in the Cairns Region, Queensland, Australia. In the 2021 census, Barron had a population of 68 people.

== Geography ==
Although Barron has been a suburb of Cairns rather than a locality since 2002, as at 2021, the principal land use is farming with little residential development.

The locality is bounded to the north-east by the Captain Cook Highway and in the other directions by Kamerunga Road (approximately). The Tablelands railway line also forms the southern boundary with Freshwater railway station (16.8810°S 145.7099°E) serving the suburb.

The Barron River enters the suburb from the south-west (Kamerunga) as does Freshwater Creek (formerly the Davidson River) with their confluence on the western boundary of the suburb (16.8666°S 145.7°E). The river then flows towards the north of the suburb and then to the south-east (along the boundary with Stratford), finally exiting to the east (Machans Beach).

The land is flat and low-lying (less than 10 metres above sea level). The main crop is sugarcane and a network of cane tramways pass through the suburb to deliver the harvested sugarcane to the Mulgrave Sugar Mill in Gordonvale.

== Demographics ==
In the 2016 census, Barron had a population of 42 people.

In the 2021 census, Barron had a population of 68 people.

== Education ==
There are no schools in Barron. The nearest government primary schools are Caravonica State School in neighbouring Caravonica to the west, Machans Beach State School in neighbouring Machans Beach to the east, and Freshwater State School in neighbouring Freshwater to the south. The nearest government secondary schools are Smithfield State High School in Smithfield to the north-west, Redlynch State College in Redlynch to the south-west, and Cairns State High School in Cairns North to the south-east.

== Amenities ==
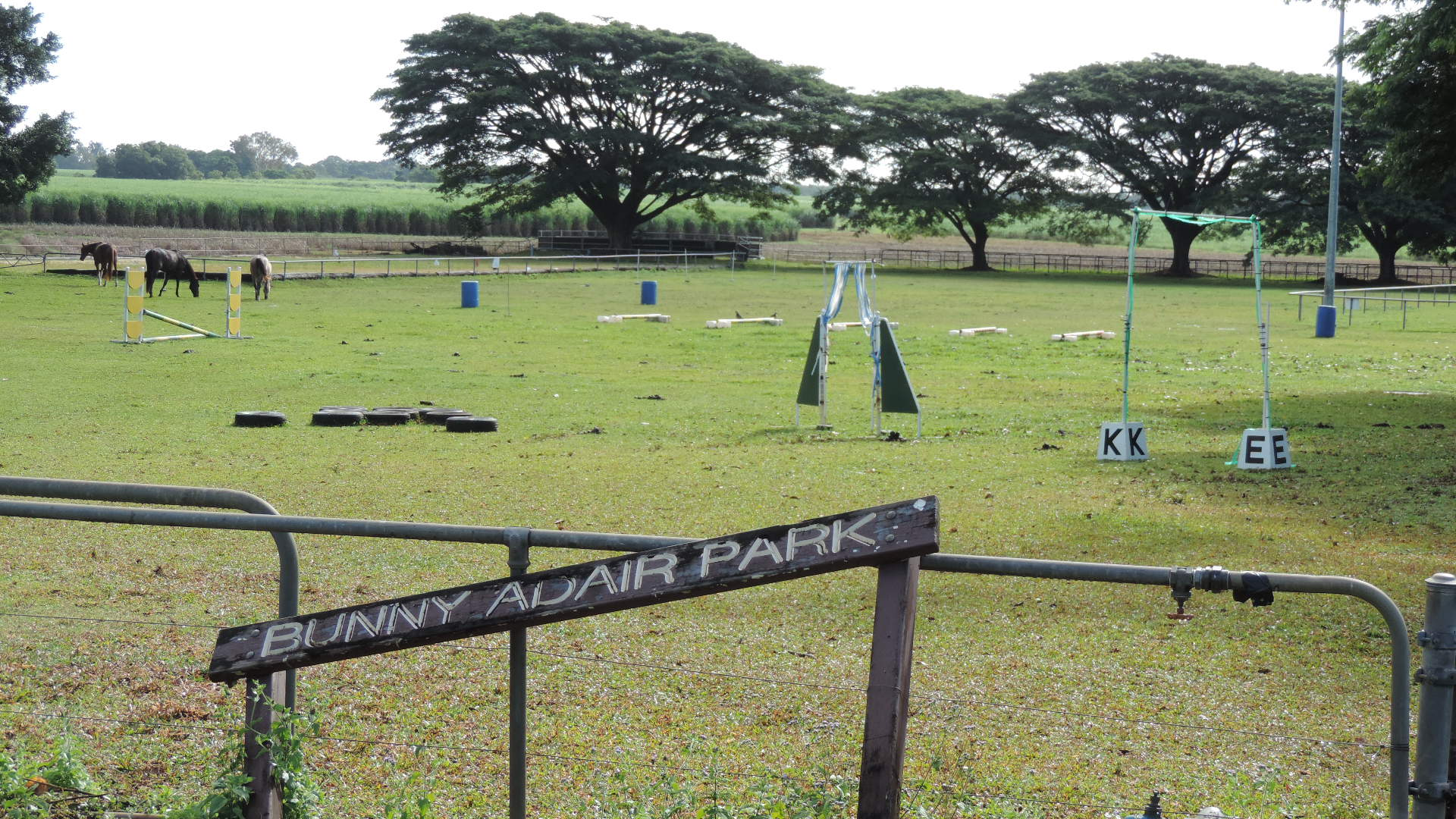
Bunny Adair Park, 2018

The Bunny Adair Park on Lower Freshwater Road (once in Freshwater but now in Barron) (16.8804°S 145.7094°E) is named after politician and Freshwater Hotel publican, Bunny Adair. The park has equestrian facilities and is home to the Freshwater Pony Club.

== Attractions ==
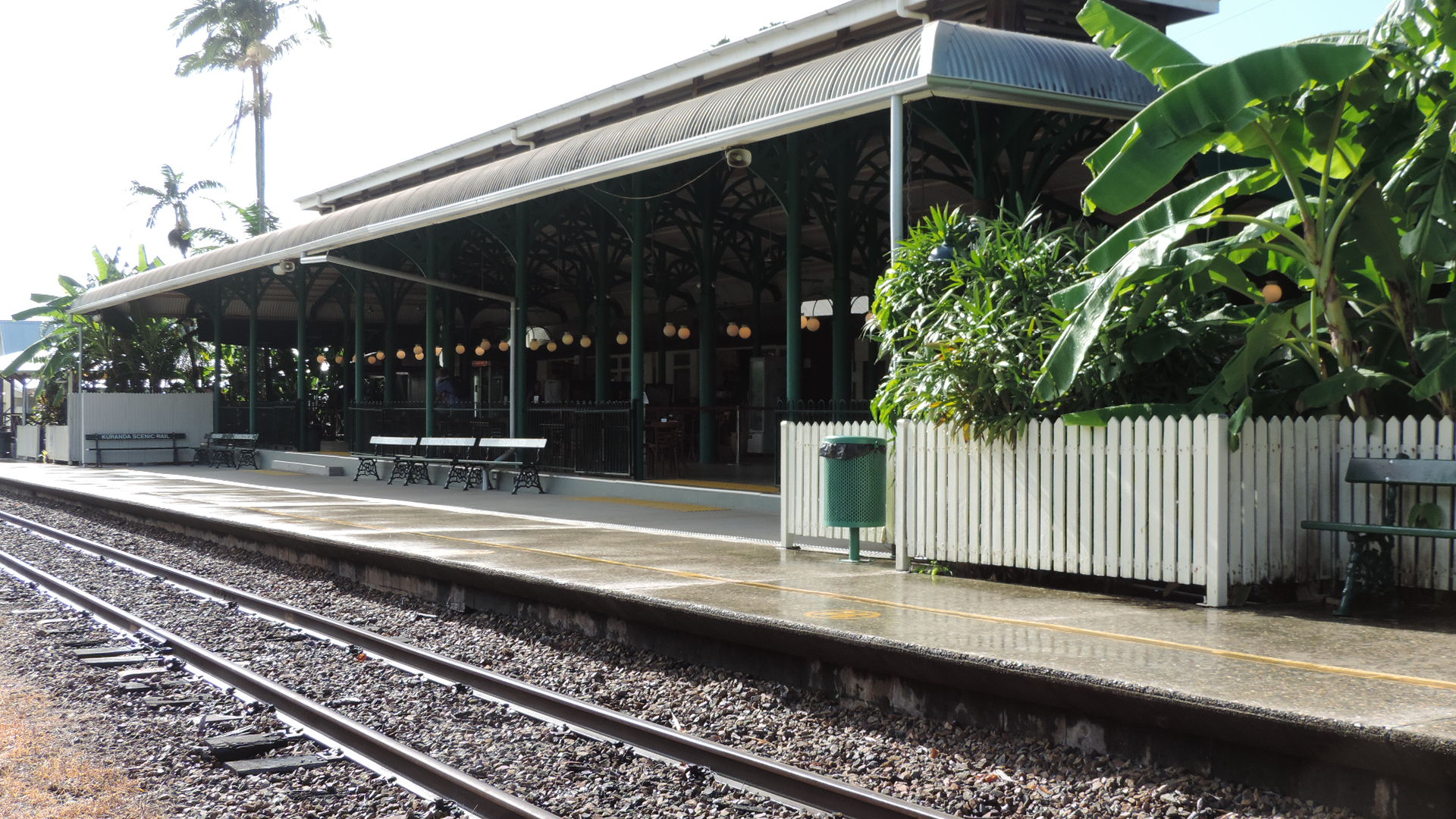
Freshwater railway station, 2018

Freshwater railway station (16.8810°S 145.7099°E) is a popular departure point for the Kuranda Scenic Railway with free parking, a restored historic railway station building, restaurant in heritage railway carriages, and a theatrette. The station is on Kumerunga Road near the junction with Old Smithfield Road.
