= Freshwater, Queensland =

Freshwater Cairns, Queensland
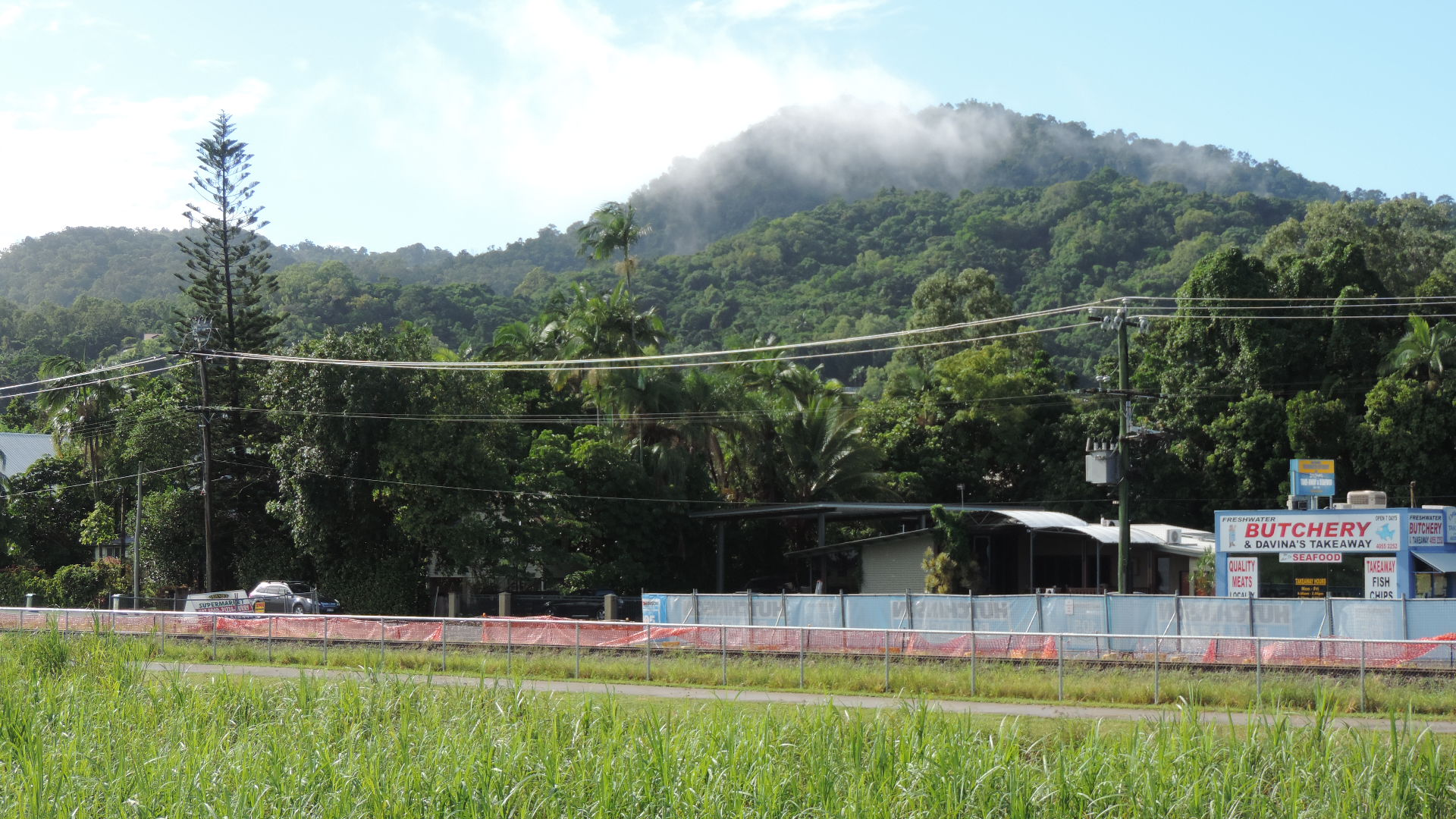
- View across the Cairns-to-Kuranda railway line towards Freshwater, 2018

- Coordinates: 16.8855°S 145.7108°E
- Population: 2,142 (2021 census)
  - Density: 1,260/km^{2} (3,260/sq mi)
- Postcode(s): 4870
- Area: 1.7 km^{2} (0.7 sq mi)
- Time zone: AEST (UTC+10:00)
- Location: 9.3 km (6 mi) NW of Cairns CBD; 353 km (219 mi) NNW of Townsville; 1,685 km (1,047 mi) NNW of Brisbane
- LGA(s): Cairns Region
- State electorate(s): Barron River
- Federal division(s): Leichhardt
Suburbs around Freshwater:
Barron	Barron	Stratford
Kamerunga	Freshwater	Stratford
Redlynch	Brinsmead	Brinsmead

Freshwater is a suburb of Cairns, Queensland, Australia. In the 2021 census, Freshwater had a population of 2,142 people.

== History ==
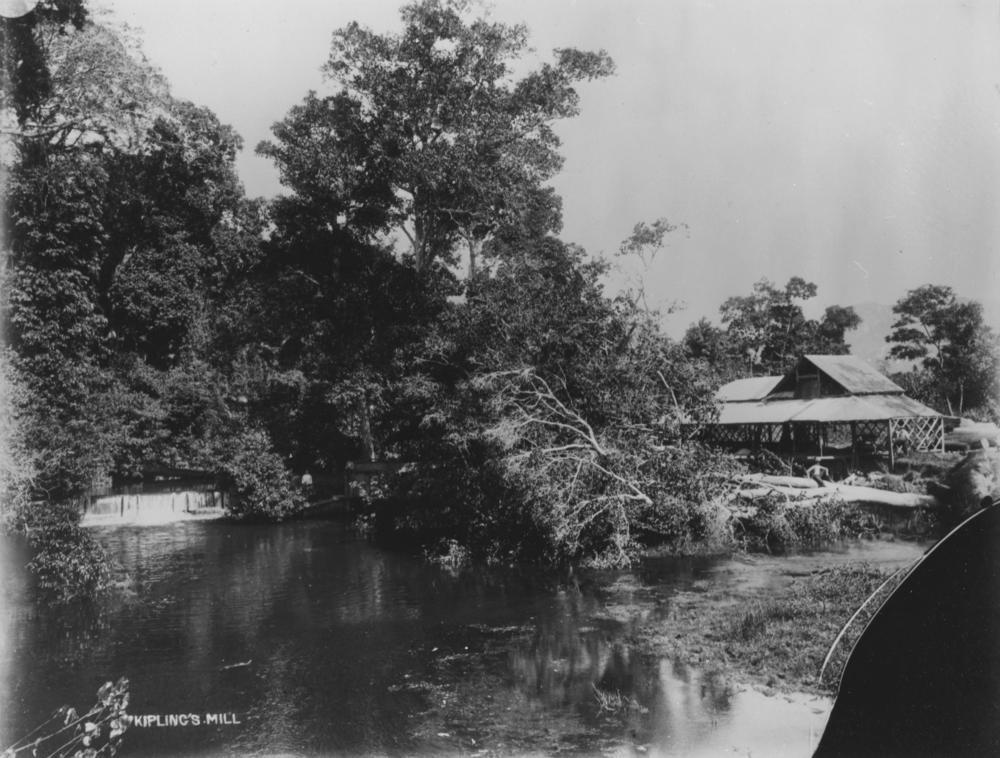
Kiplings Mill in Freshwater, circa 1890

Freshwater is in the traditional lands of the Yidiny people.

European occupation along the banks of the Barron River began in late 1876 when the Douglas Track and Smith's Track were established, linking the new port of Cairns to the Hodgkinson goldfields. Chinese market gardeners moved into the area in the late 1870s, leased small plots from the landowners, successfully growing rice, bananas, pineapples and other tropical crops.

The need for transport of large volumes of ore from the mines to the coastal ports resulted in the construction of a railway line from Cairns to Herberton, (now the Tablelands railway line). The first 13 km (8.1 mi) of this railway runs from Cairns to Redlynch crossing over Freshwaster Creek. The development of the railway line encouraged land developers to release a land subdivision called Richmond Park Estate near the railway line and Freshwater Creek, which was sold from 1886 with advertising featuring the forthcoming "Richmond Park railway station" and its ten-minute rail journey to Cairns. When the railway line opened in late 1887, there were a number of railway sidings along the line: Stratford (5 miles from Cairns), Lily Bank (6 miles from Cairns), and Richmond (7 miles from Cairns). Richmond Siding was renamed Freshwater Siding (later Freshwater railway station) in January 1890.

A rice mill was established on the Lower Freshwater Creek and was being successfully operated by local man, Joseph Kipling in 1891. Chinese farmers grew rice in the adjacent fields.

Freshwater Provisional School opened on 20 August 1896. On 1 January 1909, it became Freshwater State School. Due to low students numbers, it closed in August 1918 but re-opened on 21 September 1923.

Freshwater Post Office opened by April 1925 (a receiving office, earlier named Stratford, had been open from 1897).

Mason Memorial Methodist Church opened on Saturday 8 April 1939. It was called the Mason Memorial church because of the £60 bequest left by the late Mrs Mason to build the church. It is at 25 Vallely Street (16.8815°S 145.7119°E) and is now in private ownership in use as a house.

On Sunday 20 November 1938, Bishop John Heavey officially opened and blessed the new Sacred Heart Catholic Church.

The suburb was once a separate town in the Shire of Mulgrave but was amalgamated into the City of Cairns, which subsequently was amalgamated into the Cairns Region.

== Demographics ==
In the 2006 census, Freshwater had a population of 1,976 people.

In the 2011 census, Freshwater had a population of 2,104 people.

In the 2016 census, Freshwater had a population of 2,023 people.

In the 2021 census, Freshwater had a population of 2,142 people.

== Education ==
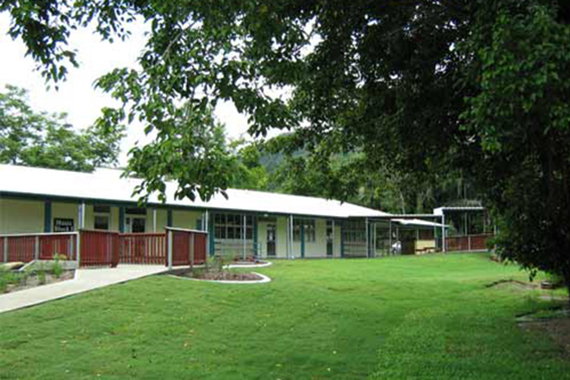
Freshwater State School, 2020

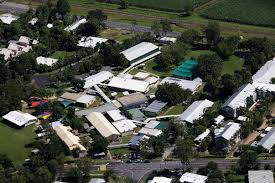
Aerial view, Freshwater State School, 2019

Freshwater State School is a government primary (Prep-6) school for boys and girls at 10 Corkill Street (16.8802°S 145.7141°E). In 2017, the school had an enrolment of 738 students with 50 teachers (43 full-time equivalent) and 25 non-teaching staff (16 full-time equivalent). In 2018, the school had an enrolment of 709 students with 52 teachers (46 full-time equivalent) and 24 non-teaching staff (16 full-time equivalent).

There is no secondary school in Freshwater. The nearest government secondary school is Redlynch State College in neighbouring Redlynch to the south-west.

== Amenities ==
Bunny Adair Park on Lower Freshwater Road (once in Freshwater but now in Barron, 16.8804°S 145.7094°E) is named after Bunny Adair. The park has equestrian facilities and is home to the Freshwater Pony Club.

The Freshwater branch of the Queensland Country Women's Association meets at the CWA Hall on the corner of Kamerunga Road and Old Smithfield Road (opposite the Freshwater railway station, 16.8815°S 145.7102°E). The branch was established in 1937 and held its meetings in the home of first president Mrs Odgen. In 1940, the railway square became available for recreational use and the CWA purchased the present site for their hall. However, it was not until after World War II that the branch focussed on raising funds for the building, having devoted their wartime activities to the manufacture of camouflage nets and contributions to the war effort. The building was completed in 1955. In additional to CWA activities, the hall is used for by other community groups and for private parties.

Sacred Heart Catholic Church is at 15 Duffy Street (16.8837°S 145.7096°E). It is within the Northern Beaches Parish of the Roman Catholic Diocese of Cairns.

== Attractions ==
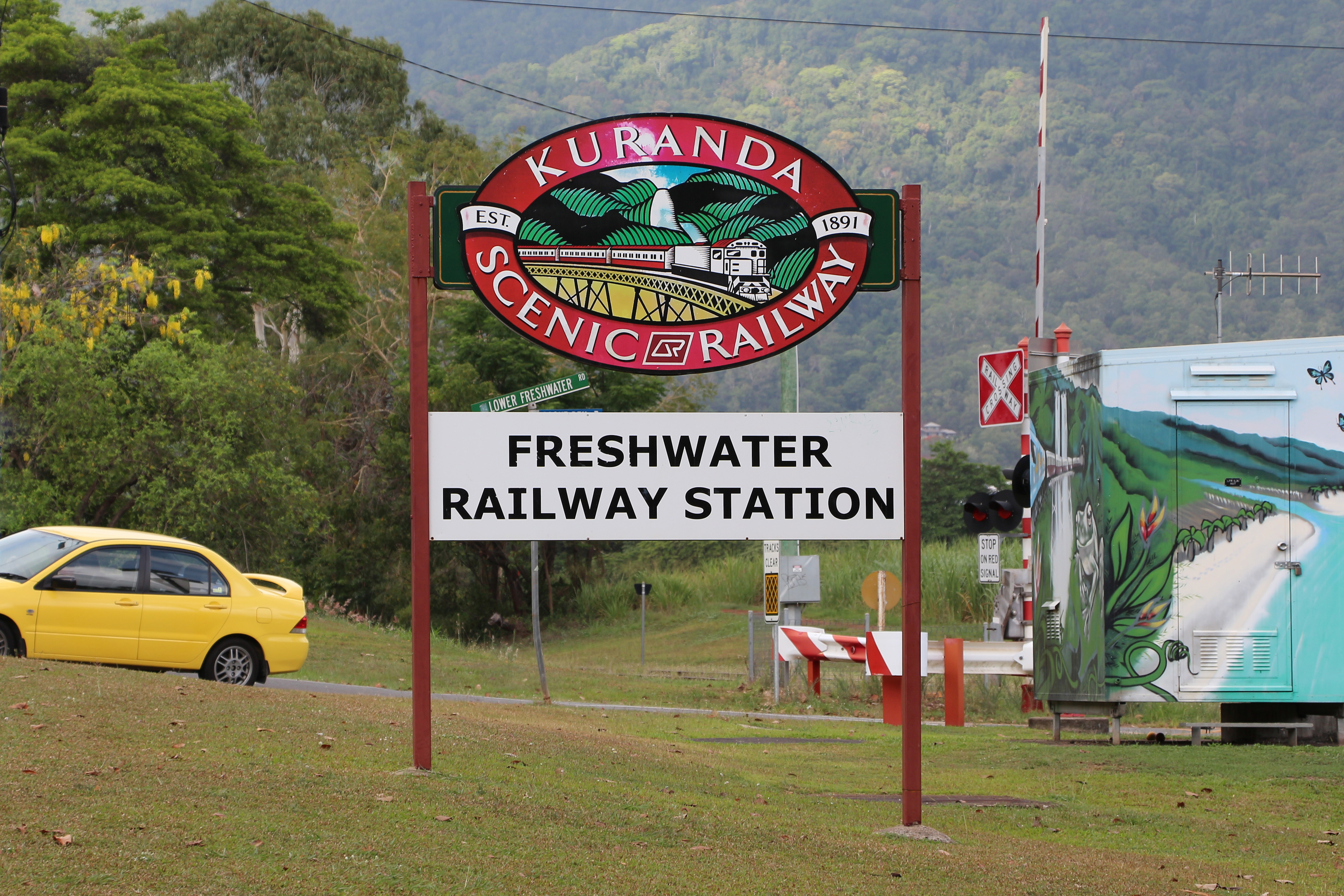
Freshwater railway station sign on the Kuranda Scenic Railway, 2015

The Kuranda Scenic Railway has a stop at the Freshwater railway station (16.8812°S 145.7096°E), which is just outside the current suburb boundaries in the neighbouring suburb of Barron.

In 2009 for the Q150 commemorations, the Stratford and Freshwater Community Association built a heritage trail, with 22 signposted sites in Freshwater and 29 signposted sites in the neighbouring suburb of Stratford.

== Notable people ==
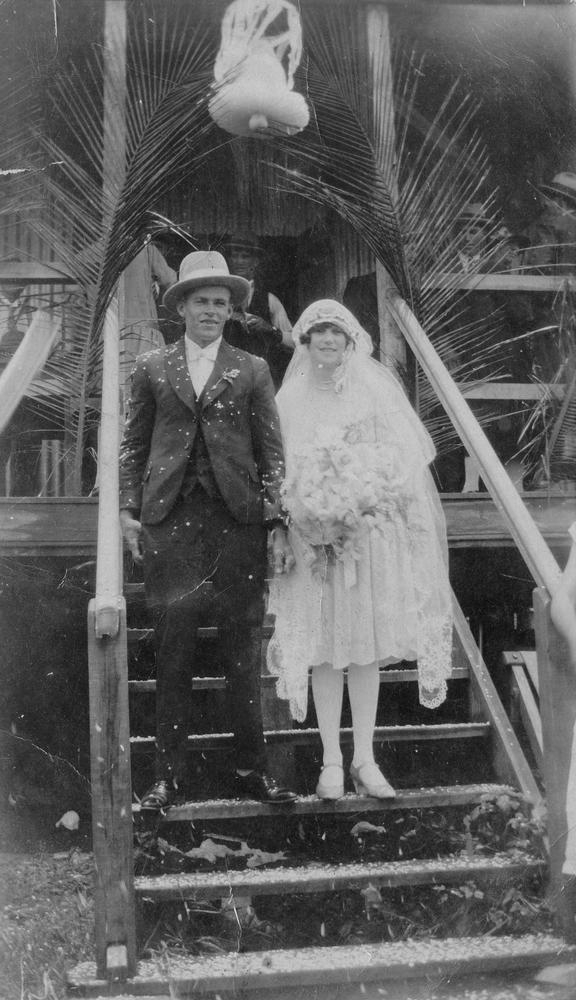
Herbert ("Bunny") Adair and Gladys Down, just married, Freshwater Hall, 1928

- Bunny Adair, Member of the Queensland Legislative Assembly and publican at the Freshwater Hotel.
