= Cairns North =

- Suburb
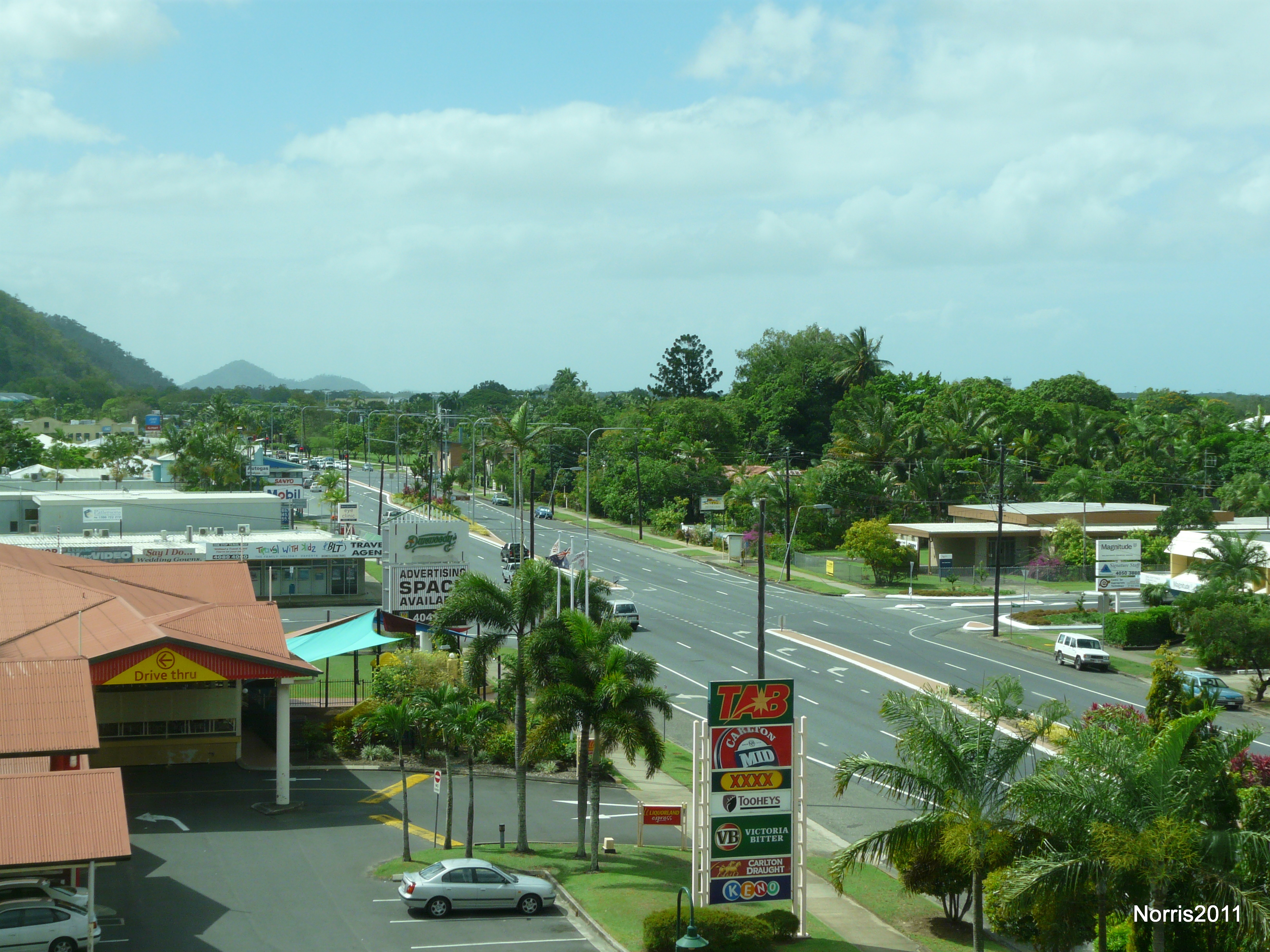
- View along Sheridan Street, 2011

- Interactive map of Cairns North
- Coordinates: 16.91°S 145.7616°E
- Country: Australia
- State: Queensland
- City: Cairns
- LGA: Cairns Region
- Location: 2.4 km (1.5 mi) NW of Cairns CBD; 349 km (217 mi) NNW of Townsville; 1,681 km (1,045 mi) NNW of Brisbane

Government
  - State electorate: Cairns
  - Federal division: Leichhardt

Area
  - Total: 6.1 km^{2} (2.4 sq mi)

Population
  - Total: 5,334 (2021 census)
  - Density: 874/km^{2} (2,265/sq mi)
- Time zone: UTC+10:00 (AEST)
- Postcode: 4870
Suburbs around Cairns North
Whitfield	Aeroglen	Trinity Bay
Edge Hill	Cairns North	Trinity Bay
Manunda	Parramatta Park	Cairns City

Cairns North is a coastal suburb of Cairns in the Cairns Region, Queensland, Australia. In the 2021 census, Cairns North had a population of 5,334 people.

== Geography ==
The suburb is bounded to the north by the Cairns Airport, to the east by Trinity Bay (16.903°S 145.774°E), and to the west by Lily Creek (16.9014°S 145.7533°E). As the name Cairns North suggests, it is immediately north of the Cairns central business district.

Sheridan Street enters the suburb from the south-east (Cairns City) and exits to the north (Aeroglen). It is part of Highway 1 (the main route around the Australian coast). The Tablelands railway line also enters the suburb from the south-east (Cairns City) and follows close to the south-western boundary of Cairns North before exiting to the north (Aeroglen), with Edgehill railway station (also known as Cairns North railway station) within the suburb (16.8977°S 145.7543°E).

The suburb is flat land just above sea level. Parkland and an esplanade separate the developed areas of the suburb from the sea. At high tide there is a small sandy beach but low tide reveals an extensive mudflat.

The suburb has a mix of uses having both permanent and holiday residential (the latter being mostly close to the shore), commercial buildings and community facilities.

== History ==
Cairns North is situated in the Yidinji traditional Aboriginal country.

Edge Hill State School opened in Cairns North on 19 February 1917. It was renamed Cairns North State School in 1939 (just prior to the opening of a separate Edge Hill State School in neighbouring suburb of Edge Hill in 1940). Cairns North State School closed on 31 December 2004. The school was 381 Sheridan Street (16.9021°S 145.7562°E).

Cairns State High School opened on 28 January 1924, having commenced operation as an annex to Cairns Central State School in 1917.

Mother of Good Counsel School opened on 29 March 1936 with 19 students, after Father Phelan (an Augustinian priest) saw the need for Catholic education in the area. The school was operated by the Sisters of Mercy.

The North Cairns parish of the Roman Catholic Diocese of Cairns was established in 1952.

Although Cairns North has a beach, in 1962 concerns about marine stingers in the seawater resulted in the establishment of the Tobruk Memorial swimming pool (not to be confused with the similarly named pool in Townsville).

== Demographics ==
In the 2016 census, Cairns North had a population of 5,191 people. Aboriginal and Torres Strait Islander people made up 7.0% of the population. 47.8% of people were born in Australia. The next most common countries of birth were India 4.9%, England 4.1%, New Zealand 3.4% and Japan 2.5%. 56.6% of people spoke only English at home. Other languages spoken at home included Punjabi 3.2%, Japanese 2.8% and Mandarin 2.5% The most common response for religion was No Religion at 32.5%.

In the 2021 census, Cairns North had a population of 5,334 people.

== Heritage listings ==
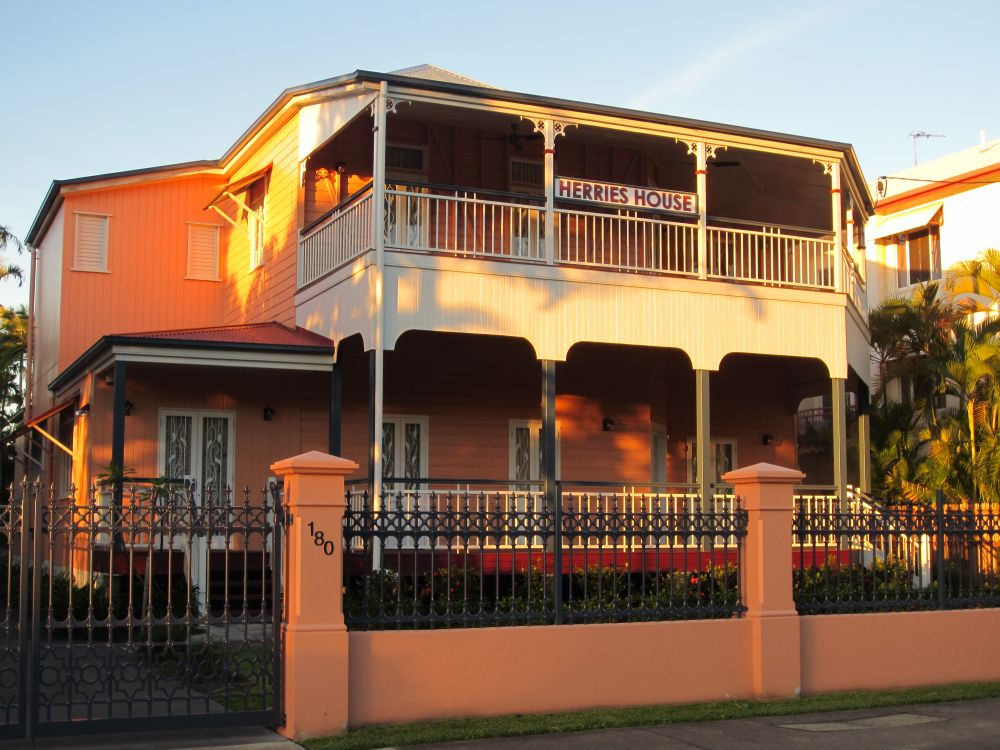
Former Herries Private Hospital, 2015

Cairns North has a number of heritage-listed sites, including:

- 127–145 McLeod Street: McLeod Street Pioneer Cemetery
- 180 McLeod Street: former Herries Private Hospital
- Sheridan Street: Cairns Technical College and High School Building (now Block A of the Cairns State High School)
- 183–185 The Esplanade, Cairns North: Floriana

== Education ==
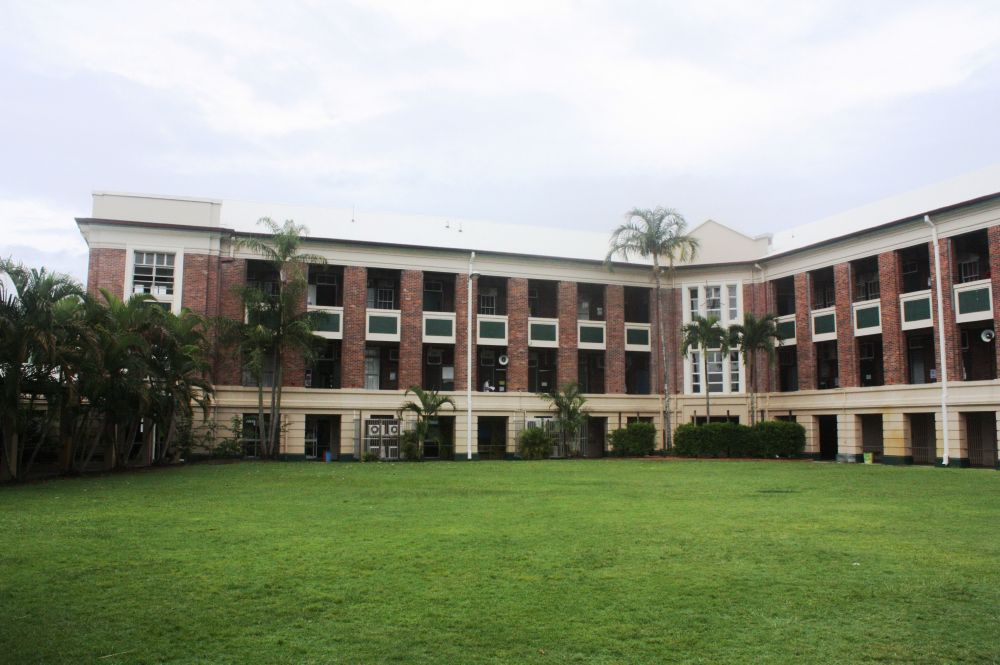
Cairns Technical College and High School Building, 2013

Mother of Good Counsel School is a Catholic primary (Prep–6) school for boys and girls at 394 Sheridan Street (16.8994°S 145.7562°E). In 2018, the school had an enrolment of 374 students with 25 teachers (21 full-time equivalent) and 13 non-teaching staff (9 full-time equivalent). In 2022, the school had 353 students with 31 teachers (25.7 full-time equivalent) and 14 non-teaching staff (10.7 full-time equivalent).

Cairns State High School is a government secondary (7–12) school for boys and girls at 156-194 Sheridan Street (corner of Upward Street, 16.9166°S 145.7680°E). It includes a special education program. In 2018, the school had an enrolment of 1,673 students with 131 teachers (123 full-time equivalent) and 67 non-teaching staff (52 full-time equivalent). In 2022, the school had 1,585 students with 128 teachers (120 full-time equivalent) and 52 non-teaching staff (44 full-time equivalent).

There is no government primary school in Cairns North. The nearest government primary schools are Edge Hill State School in neighbouring Edge Hill to the west and Parramatta State School in neighbouring Parramatta Park to the south.

== Facilities ==
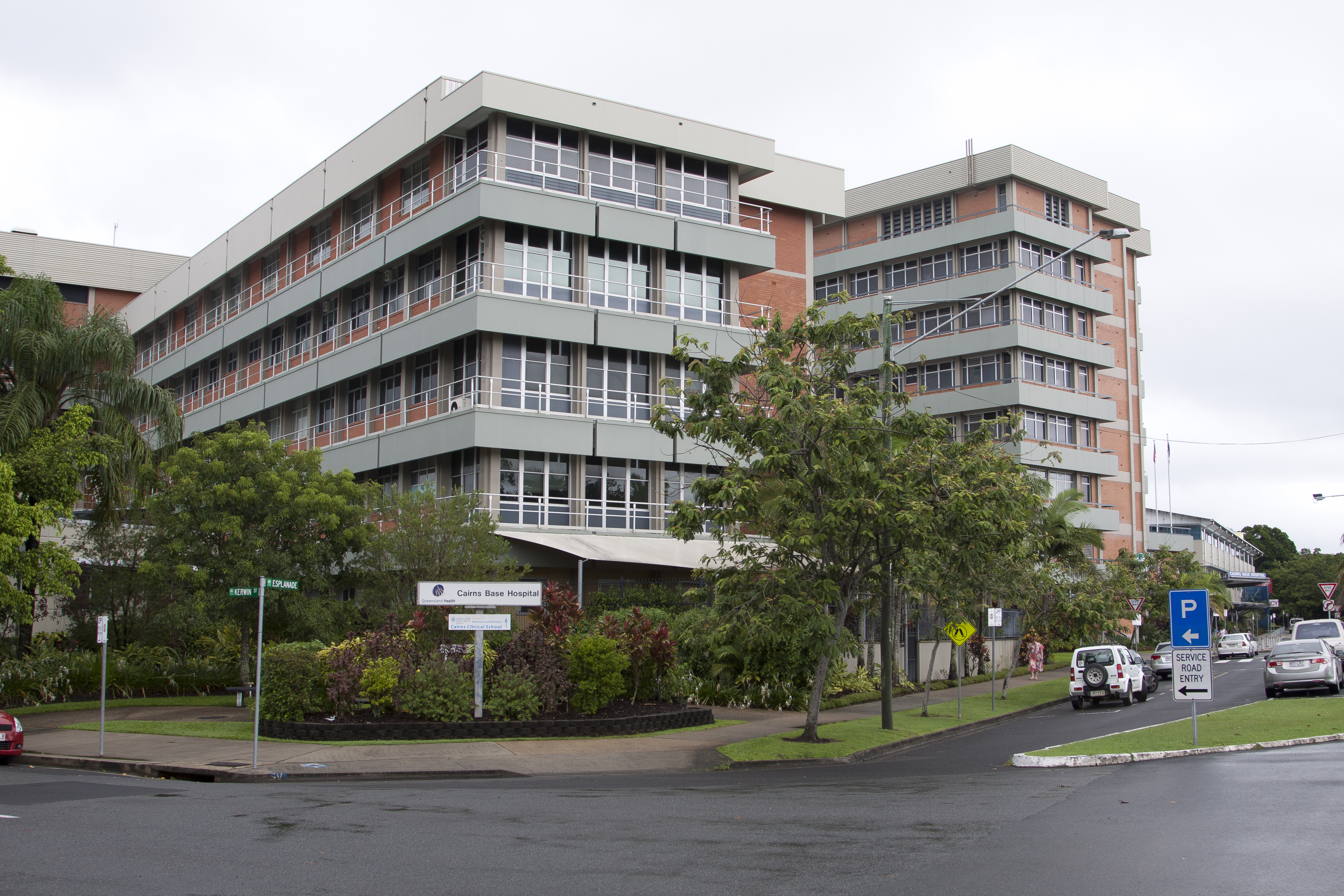
Cairns Hospital

Cairns Hospital (formerly Cairns Base Hospital) is a public hospital at 165 The Esplanade (16.9124°S 145.7681°E). It has an accident and emergency centre. It has a heliport on the foreshore opposite for emergency helicopter transport to the hospital (16.9115°S 145.7689°E). The Royal Flying Doctor Service has one of its nine Queensland bases at nearby Cairns Airport.

Cairns North Community Health Facility is a public health centre providing a range of outpatient services at 381 Sheridan Street (16.9021°S 145.7562°E), the site of the former Cairns North State School.

The Cairns Clinic is a private mental health facility at 253 Sheridan Street (16.9108°S 145.7620°E). It has a 30-bed facility for in-patients as well as out-patient programs. It is operated by Ramsay Health Care.

McLeod Street Pioneer Cemetery is bounded by McLeod Street, Grove Street, and the railway line (16.9156°S 145.7643°E). It is an historic cemetery and now closed for burials but is open to the public to visit between 6am and 6:30pm. An information kiosk has details of those buried and the location of their grave.

== Amenities ==
The Cairns branch of the Queensland Country Women's Association meets at 264 Grafton Street, Cairns North (16.9127°S 145.7666°E).

Mother of Good Counsel Catholic Church is at 394 Sheridan Street (16.8992°S 145.7560°E) on the same site as the Mother of Good Counsel Catholic School. It is within the North Cairns Parish of the Roman Catholic Diocese of Cairns.

St Luke's Anglican Church is at 335 McLeod Street (16.9042°S 145.7562°E). It is part of the Cairns Aboriginal and Torres Strait Ministries (CATSIM).

Tobruk Memorial Pool is at 370 Sheridan Street (16.9028°S 145.7577°E). It has a 50-metre pool, a 25-metre pool, a heated therapy pool, a toddler shallow pool, and Flow Rider (a surf-board riding experience).

Cairns Hockey Centre is in Rutherford Street (16.9007°S 145.7577°E).
