= Cairns State High School =

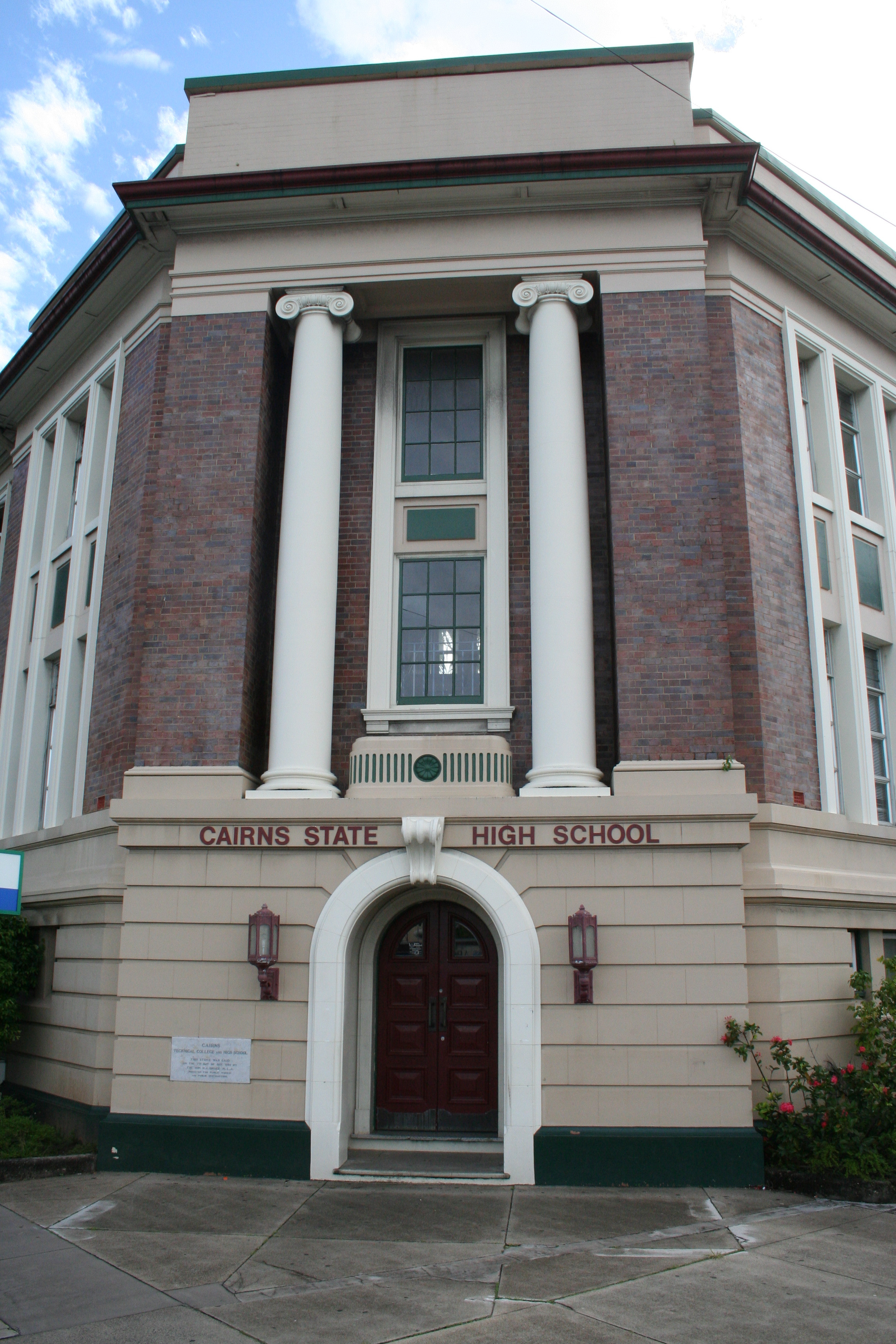

Location
- Cairns, Queensland; Australia
- Coordinates: 16°54′59″S 145°46′05″E

Information
- Type: State school
- Motto: Latin: Vincit Qui Se Vincit (One who conquers oneself conquers all)
- Established: 1917; 108 years ago
- Principal: Christopher Zilm
- Teaching staff: 133
- Grades: Year 7 to Year 12
- Enrolment: 1,665
- Colours: White and royal blue
- Website: cairnsshs.eq.edu.au

Cairns Technical College and High School Building
- Interactive map of Cairns Technical College and High School Building
- Built: 1939–1941
- Architect: Nigel Laman Thomas
- Architectural style: Classicism

Queensland Heritage Register
- Reference no.: 602834

Cairns State High School (CSHS) is an independent public secondary school in the suburb of Cairns North in the city of Cairns, Queensland, Australia. It was founded in 1917 and is the oldest high school in Cairns. The school caters for grades 7 though 12 and has the capacity for 1,607 enrolled students. The principal of the school is Christopher Zilm.

== History ==
Cairns State High School was founded in 1917 as an annex of the Cairns Central State School, and moved to its current location in 1924 as a joint high school and technical college. In 1980, the technical college relocated, thus the site became solely a high school. In May 2014, Block A of Cairns State High School - the Cairns Technical College and High School Building - was listed on the Queensland Heritage Register. This building was designed by Nigel Laman Thomas of the Department of Housing and Public Works in 1938, and built in 1939 though 1941.

== Curriculum ==
Cairns State High School participates in various interschool and representative sport associations, including Peninsula School Sport. The school also performs dance, drama, and music productions, hosts study tours and student exchanges, and operates programmes for high-achieving students in STEM, sports, and the arts.

As of 2021, Cairns State High School no longer offers the International Baccalaureate Diploma Program which was introduced in 2011.

== Campus ==
The facilities available on site include:

- Auditorium
- Events hall
- Sports complex
- Volleyball and multi-purpose courts
- Science and computer laboratories
- Art rooms (including kiln, printing, and photography rooms)
- Practical arts rooms
- Performing arts rooms (including dance studios)
- Swimming pool

== Awards and recognition ==
The school has received the following awards:

- Best Orchestra Regional Area 2006 – The Orchestras of Australia Network Awards
- Finalists – Minister’s Awards for Excellence in Art
- Two High Distinctions, 25 Distinctions – Australasian English Competition
- Three Distinctions, Three Credits – Australasian Schools Writing Competition
- Cairns State High School Symphony Orchestra has also been winners of the competition FANFARE in 1992, 1994, 1996, 2002, 2004, 2016
- Cairns State High School Chorale has won the Creative Generation Choral Fanfare in 2017, 2019, 2021 and 2025.

=== AFL Queensland Schools Cup Achievements ===
The AFL Queensland Schools Cup is the premier Australian Rules Football competition for schools in Queensland, it is run by AFL Queensland.

==== Senior Male (Years 10-12) ====
- State Championships

(bronze) Third Place: 2018

- North Queensland Championships

(gold) Champions: 2018

==== Junior Male (Years 7-9) ====
- State Championships

(bronze) Third Place: 2017

- North Queensland Championships

(gold) Champions: 2017

== Notable alumni ==
- Aron Baynes, NBA basketball player
- Cam Cairncross, former Major League Baseball player
- Matthew Deane, Thai-Australian singer, model, actor and television presenter
- Charlie Dixon, AFL player for the Suns and Power
- Erin Holland, beauty pageant model
- Bob Manning, ex-mayor of the Cairns Regional Council
- Dan Sultan, musician and activist
- Brenton Thwaites, actor

== Gallery ==
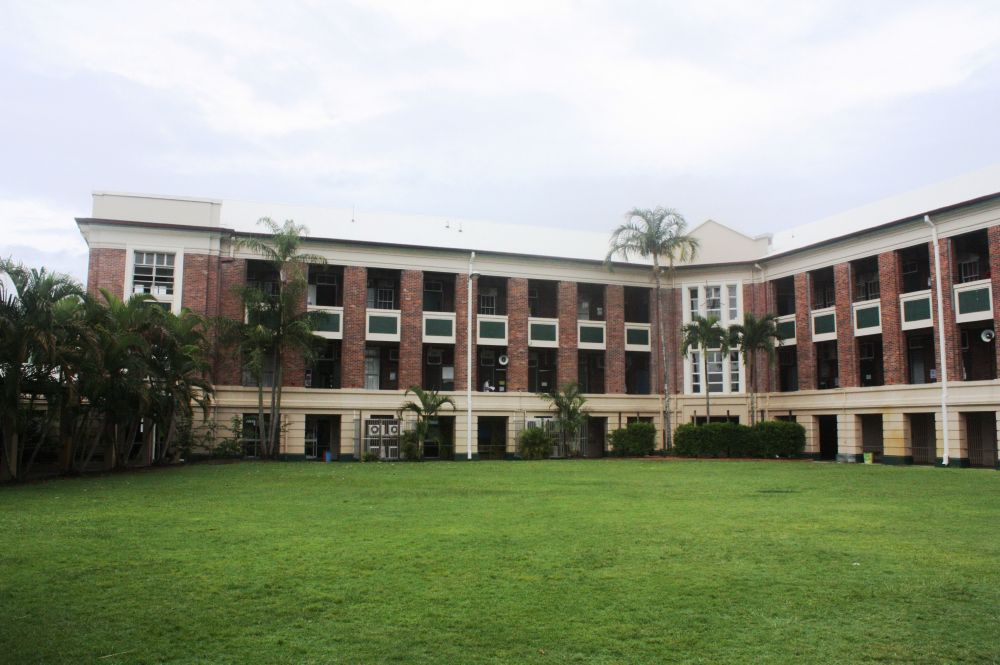
Block A from quadrangle

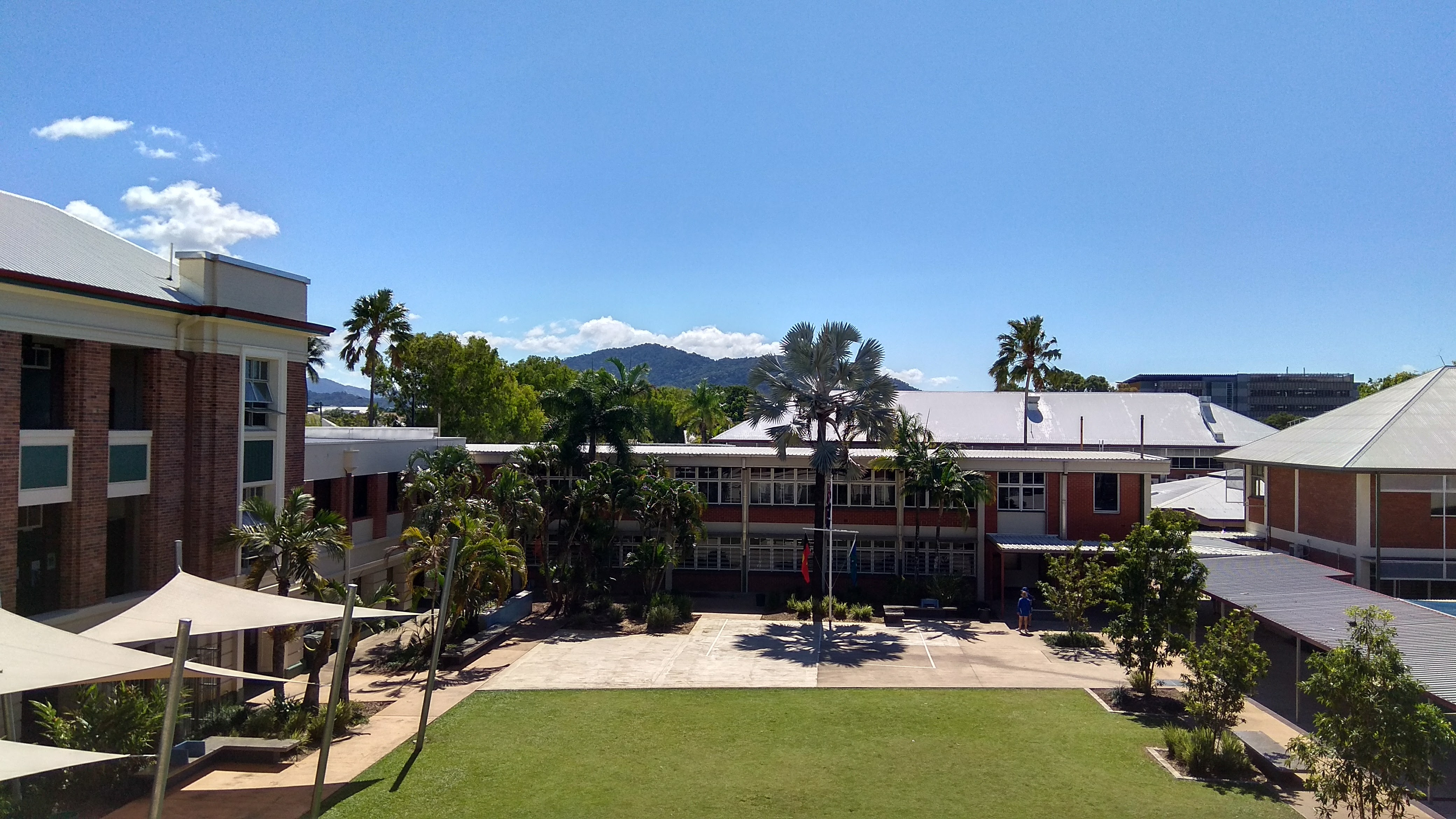
Quadrangle from Block A

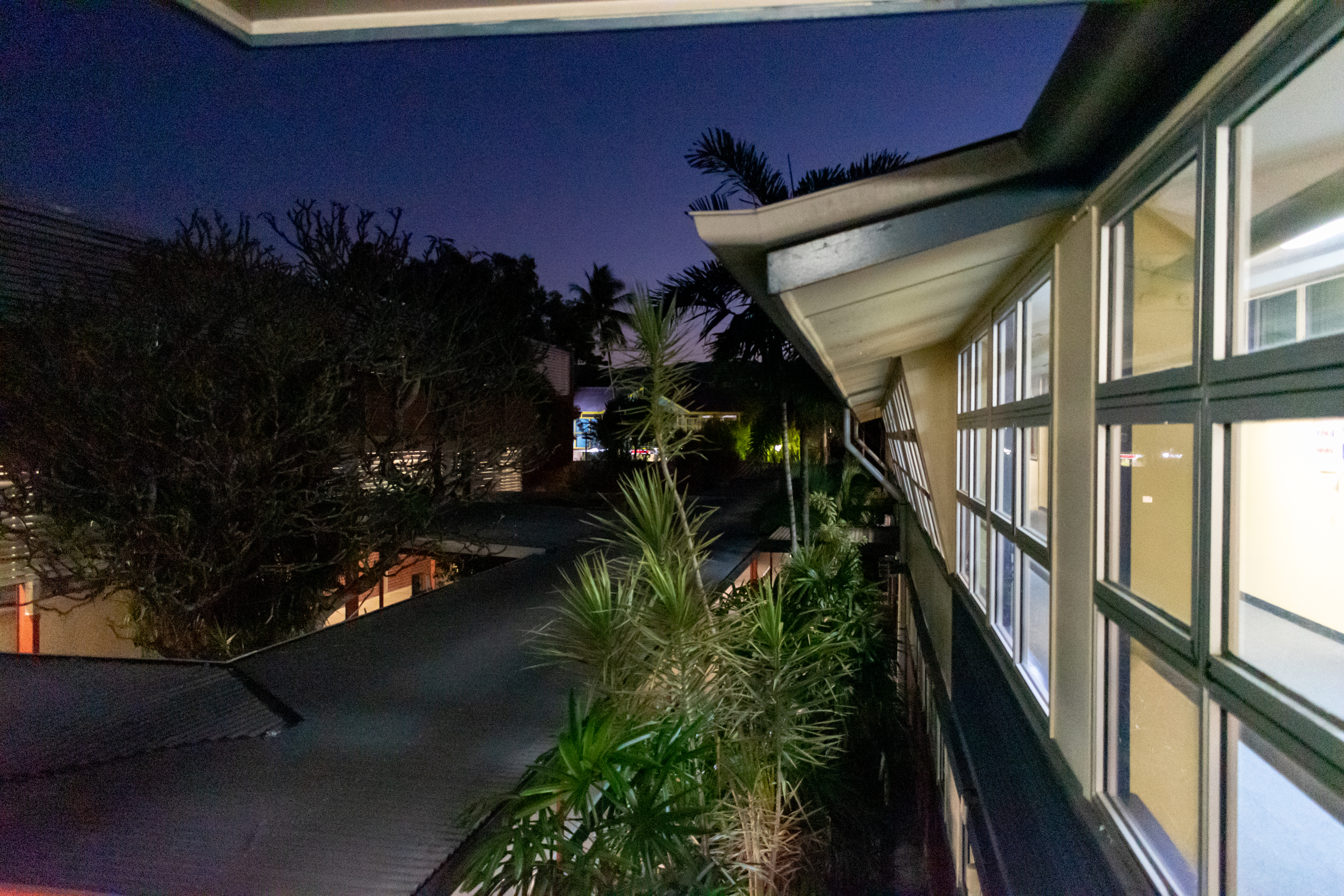
Block E at night

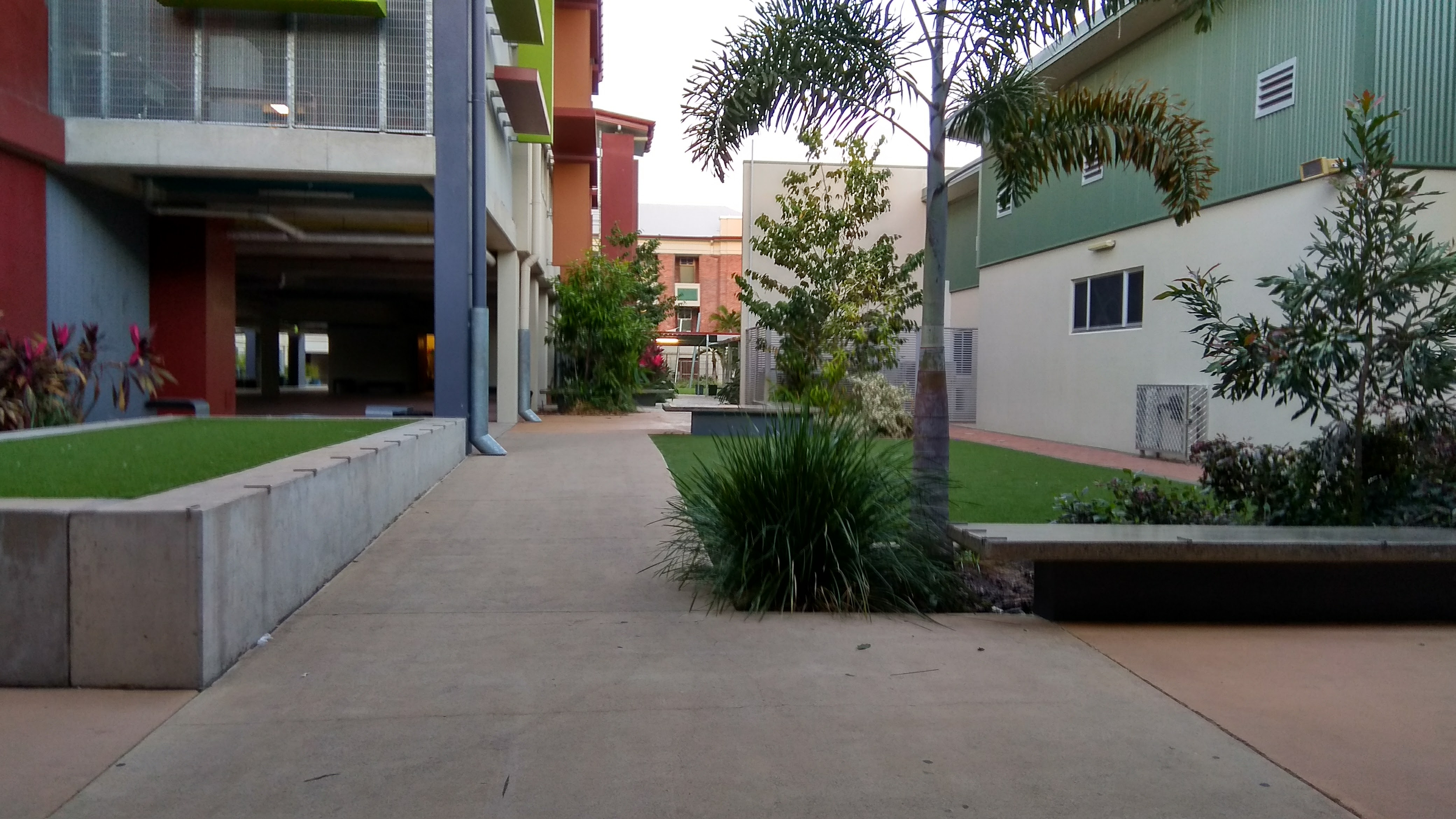
Walkway near Block F

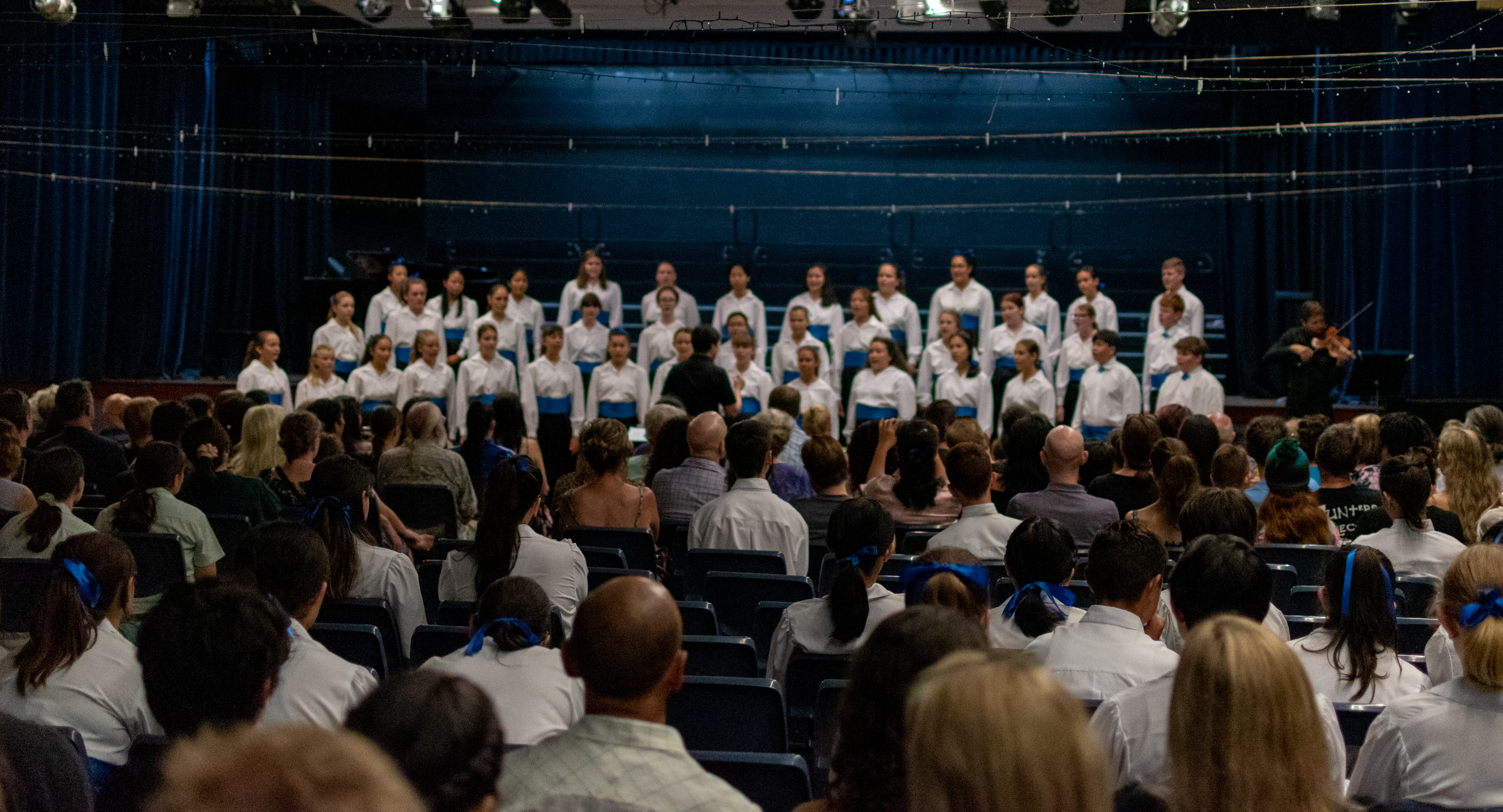
Choir performance in Crosswell Hall

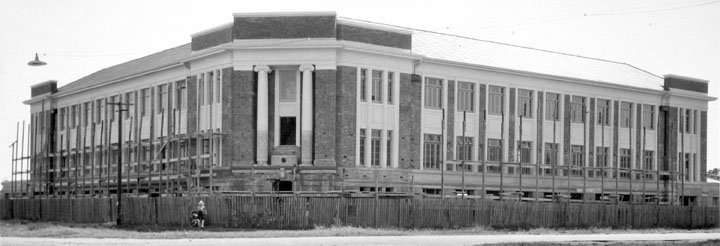
Block A under construction, 1940

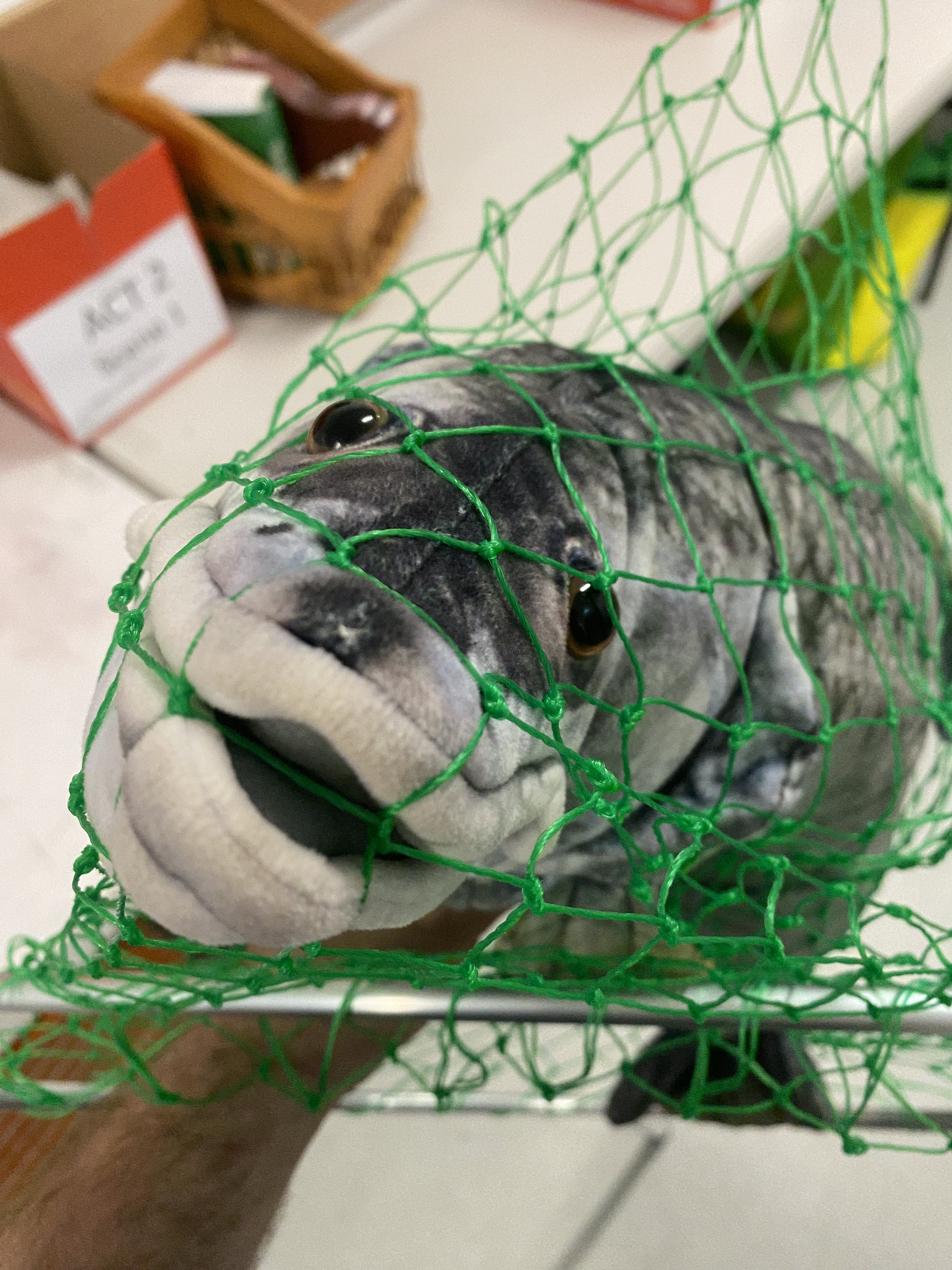
Fish (Fish) Prop (Property) used for Mama Mia rendition at Cairns State High School 2025.

== See also ==
- List of schools in Far North Queensland
