= Cairns Hospital =

- Queensland Health
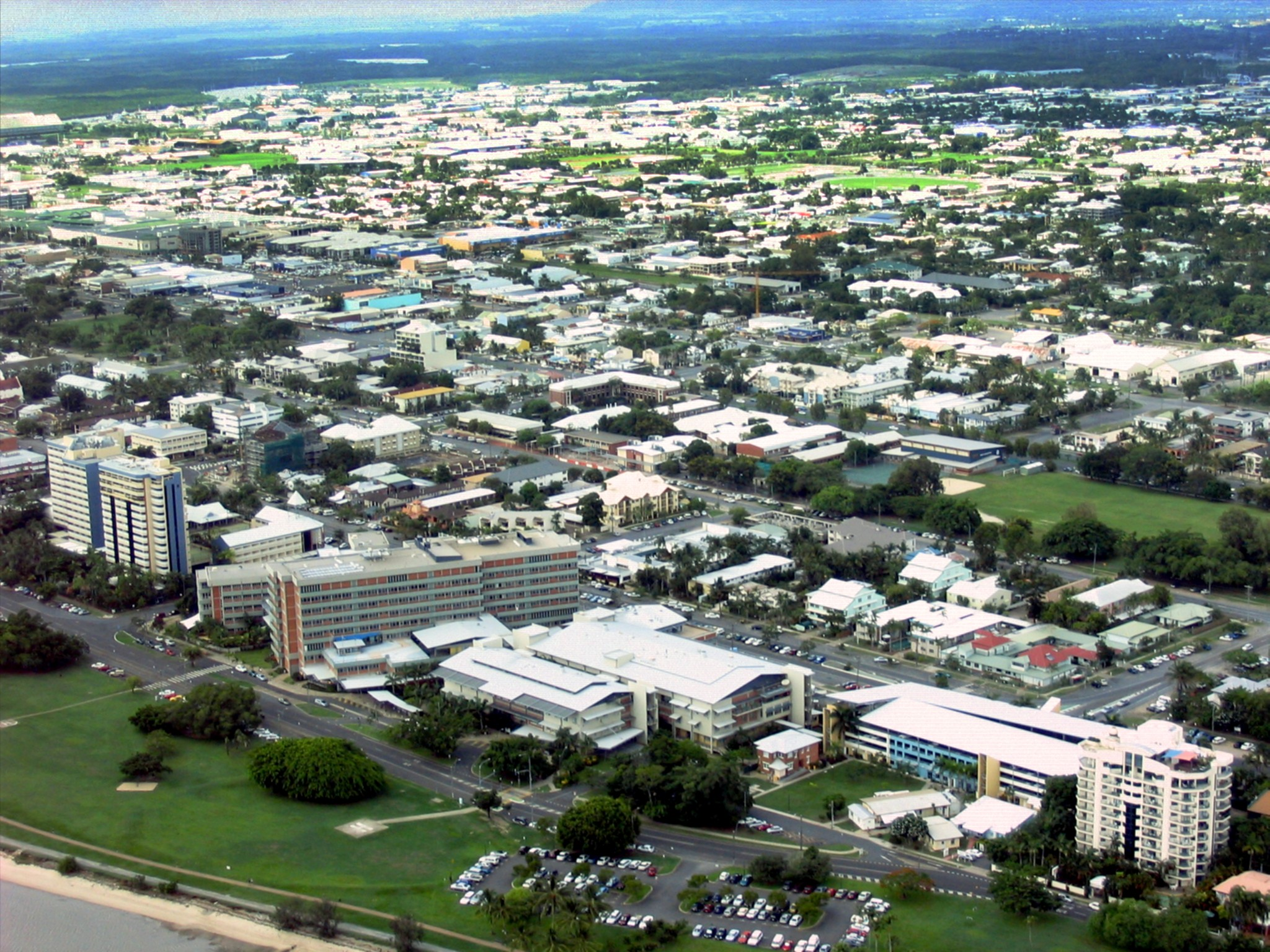
- Cairns Base Hospital (foreground), 2007

Geography
- Location: 165 The Esplanade, Cairns North, Cairns, Queensland, Australia
- Coordinates: 16.9122°S 145.7677°E

Organisation
- Care system: Public Medicare (AU)

Services
- Emergency department: Yes
- Beds: 531

Helipads
Number	Length		Surface
Number	ft	m	Surface
1			concrete

History
- Founded: 1878

Links
- Website: Official Website
- Lists: Hospitals in Australia

Cairns Hospital, known as the Cairns Base Hospital between 1932 and 2013, is the largest major hospital in Far North Queensland, Australia. It is located at 165 The Esplanade, Cairns North, Cairns. The hospital offers general services to Cairns and surrounding areas, a population of about 250,000 people.

The building complex has a 667-space multi-storey car park with a pedestrian overpass linking it to the rest of the hospital.

In 2011, a shortage of beds for mental health patients meant some were staying for more than 100 hours in the emergency department.

== History ==
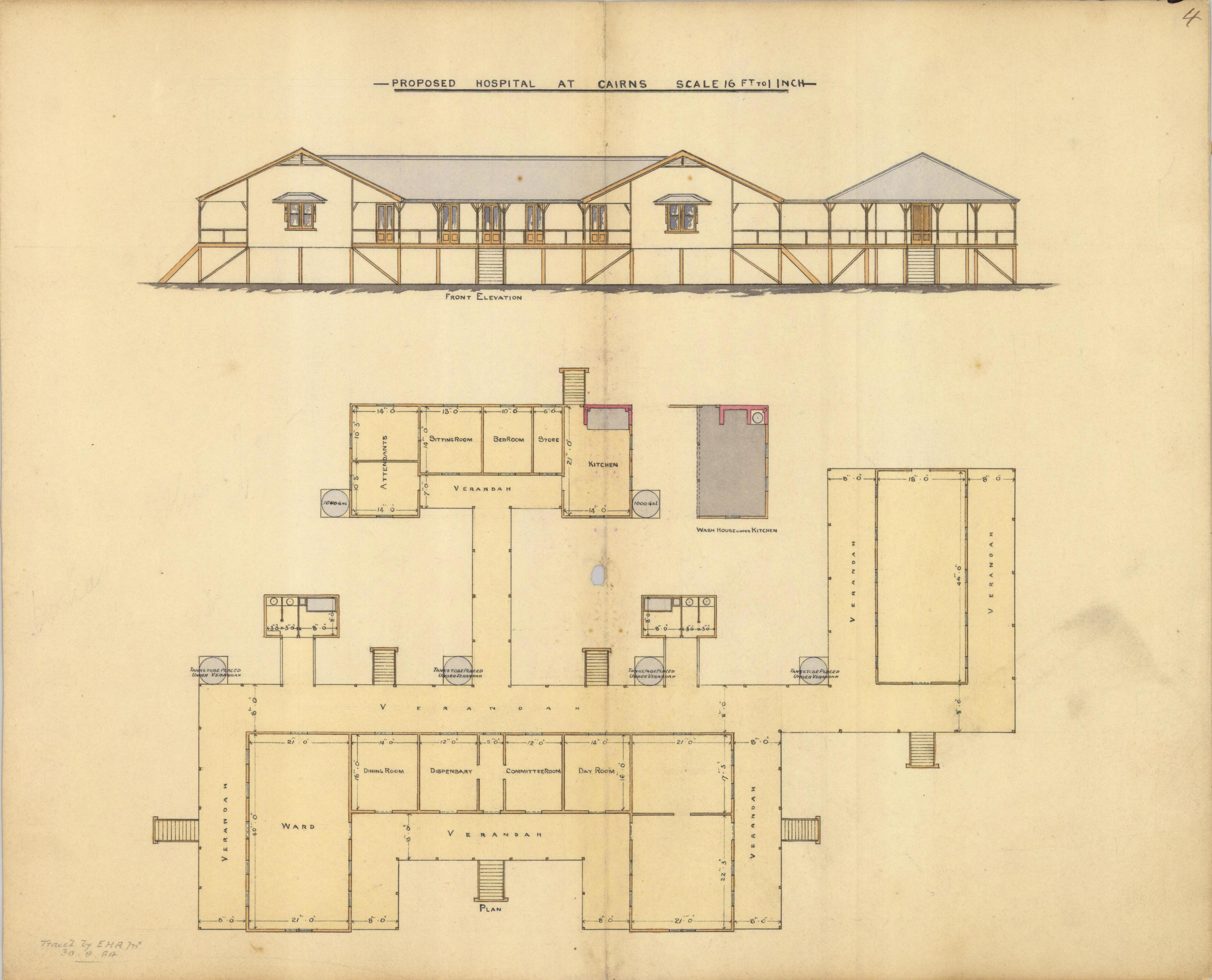
Architectural drawing for the "new" hospital, 1884

On 3 March 1877, a meeting of residents in Cairns decided to establish a hospital, raising £75 in donations at the meeting and further £35 following the meeting. At that time, the nearest hospital was in Cooktown. In October 1877, the Queensland Government voted to contribute £200 towards a hospital in Cairns. By February 1878, a hospital had been established with a local correspondent describing it as follows:

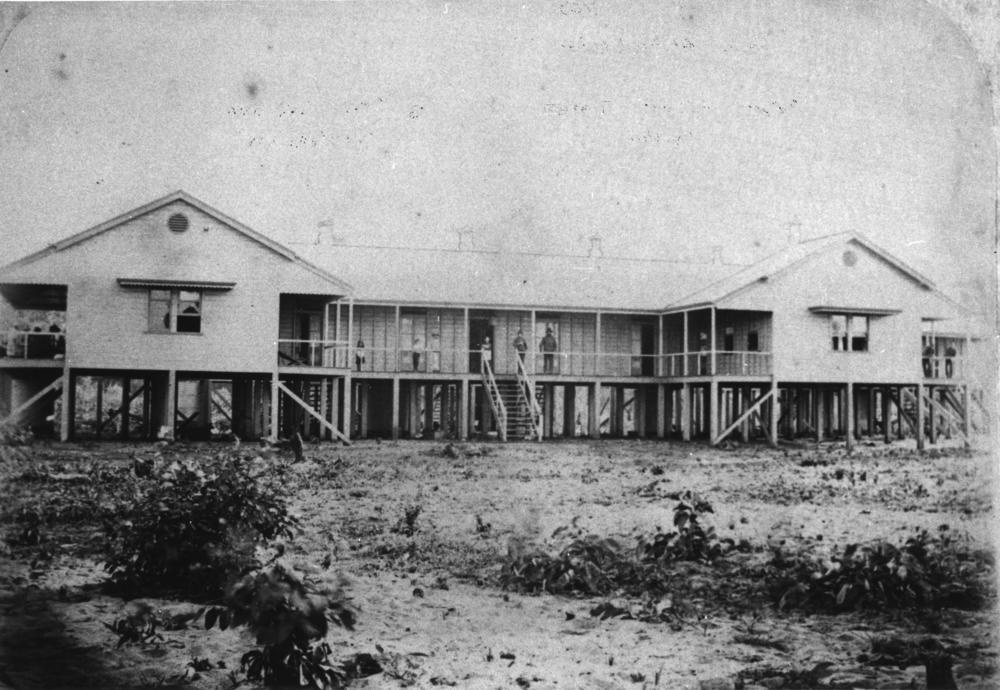
View of the front of the Cairns Hospital and the covered verandahs, 1886

"We have a commodious hospital here, nicely situated on the beach facing the north, but it seems that Cairns is so healthy that we can't find any inmates for it."

In September 1884, the Queensland Government called for tenders for the construction of a new hospital for Cairns with the contract awarded in November 1883 to H. A. Leisner for £2218.

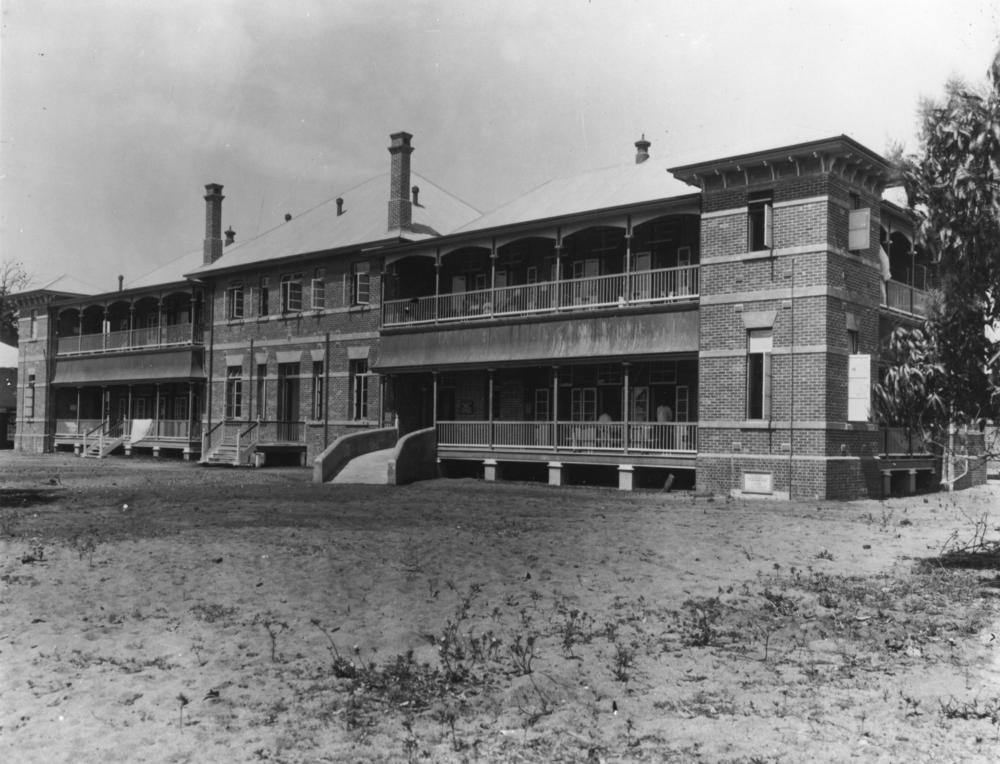
Cairns Hospital after completion, 1914

In 1908 a competition was held for architectural designs of the new Cairns District Hospital. The winner was a two-storey design by Harvey George Draper of Cairns. On 21 August 1910 the foundation stone was laid but it was not until November 1910 that the Queensland Government had negotiated a contract with John Thomas Bulcock to build the new hospital. The hospital was officially opened on 28 July 1912.

The tower blocks were built in the 1980's and remain in use. Block A was the former surgical building, now repurposed into largely administrative sections, and Block B formerly housed the medical wards, now mainly used for outpatient activity. Inpatients were relocated to D block upon its opening in 2015.

The Cairns Hospital name change with removal of the term 'base' occurred in 2013, as today's hospital is no longer a provincial facility. In September 2016 the 7-member board resigned in September 2016 over failure to recoup an $80 million budget deficit, resulting in the hospital being managed by a single administrator Terry Mehan.

== Redevelopment ==
The central block was opened in 1999, containing the redeveloped emergency department, intensive care unit and operating theatres. These were relocated from the A and B tower blocks. In 2015, a $454.6 million redevelopment occurred at the hospital, including the introduction of an additional 168 beds. These works increased the total number of beds to 531. It also increased the number of operating theatres to 11.

== See also ==
- List of hospitals in Australia

== Gallery ==
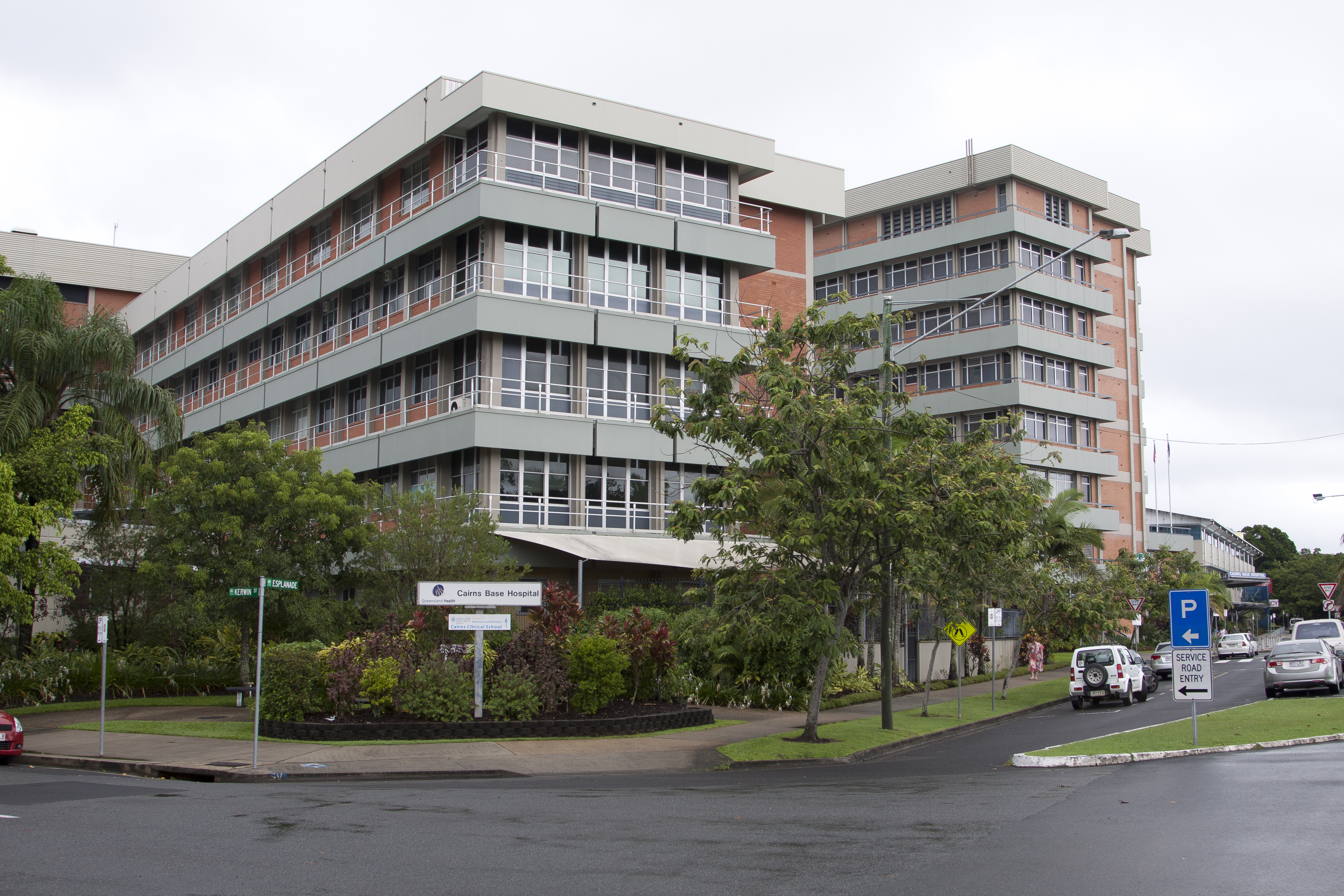
View from the Esplanade, 2012

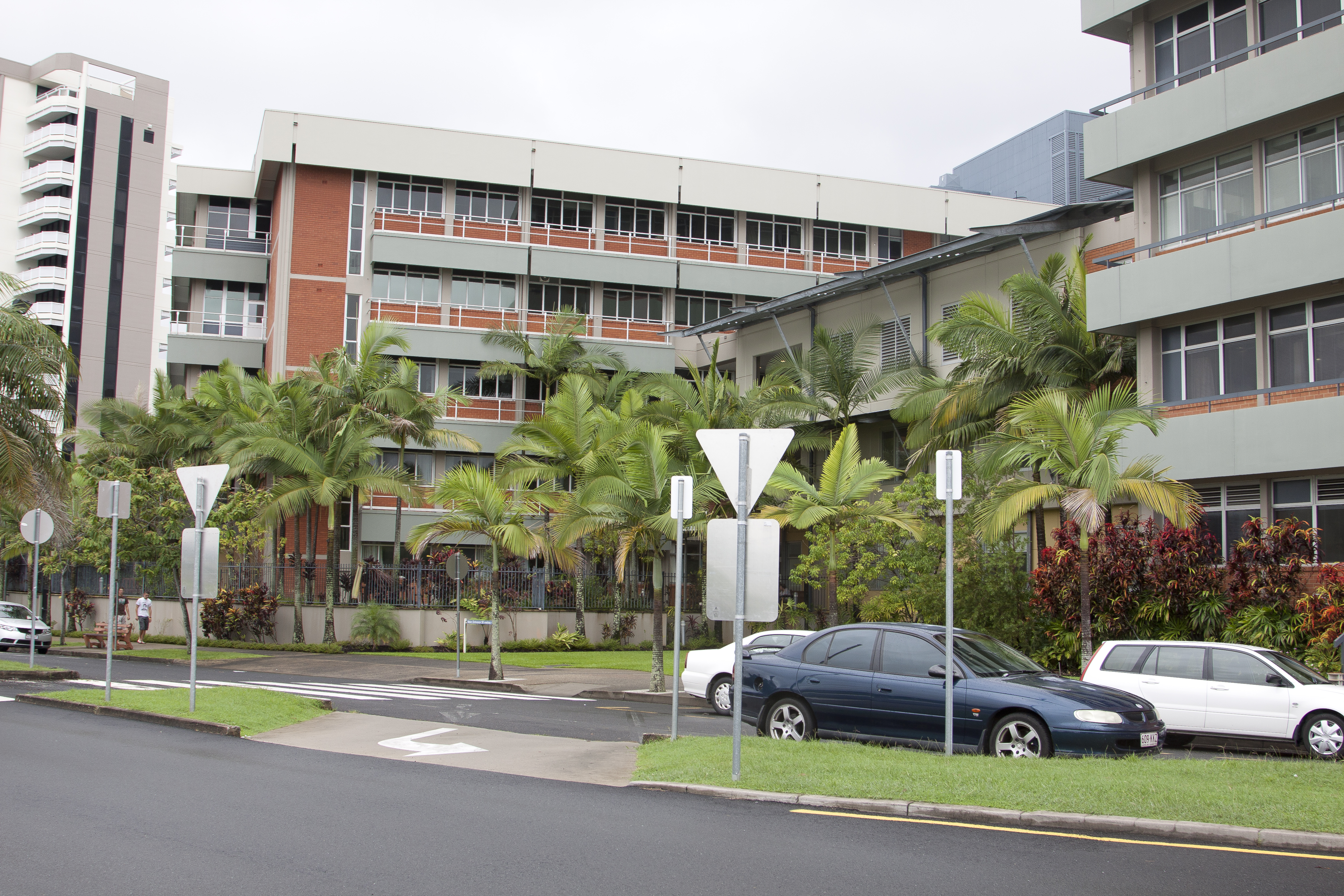
View from the Esplanade, 2012

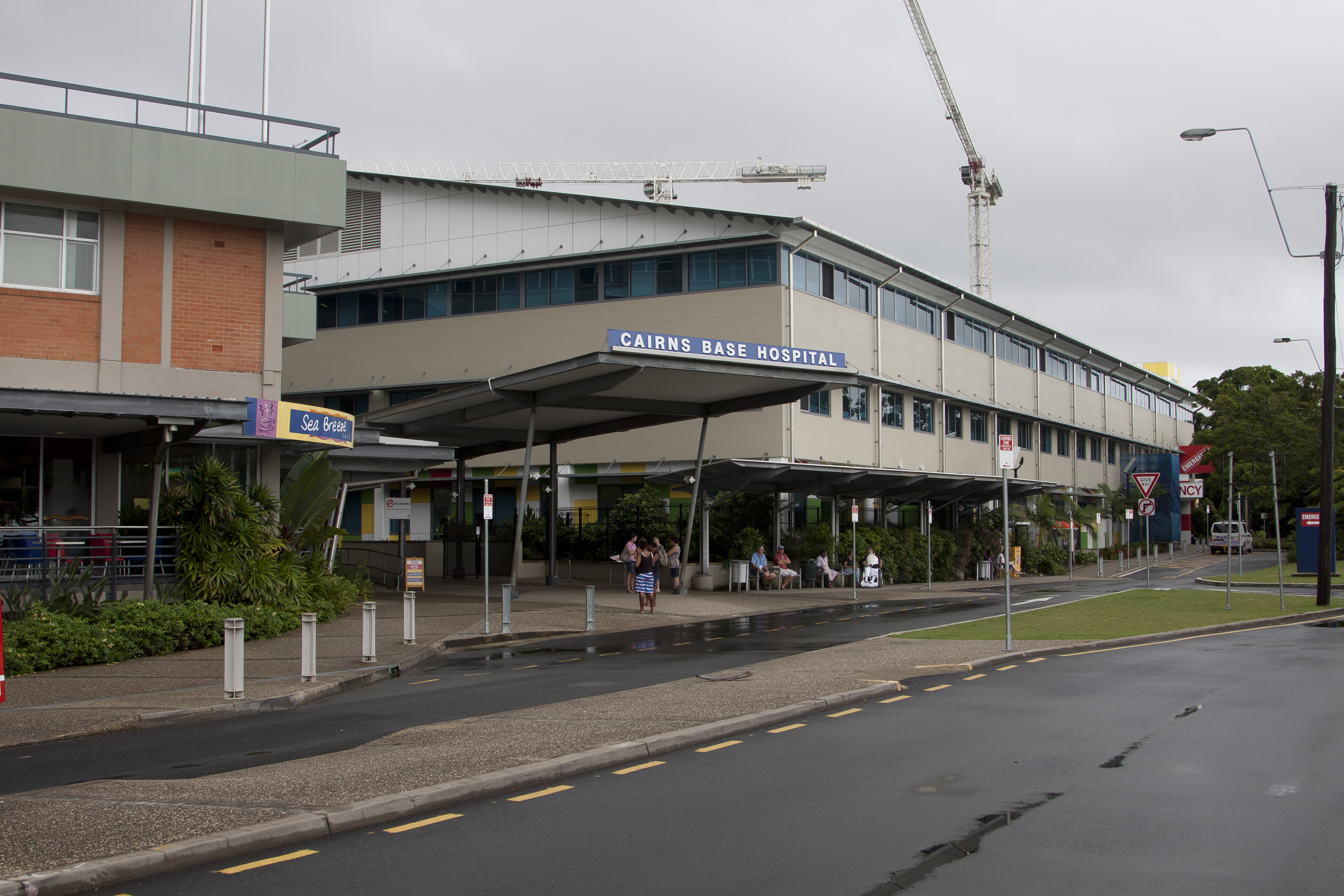
Main entrance, 2012

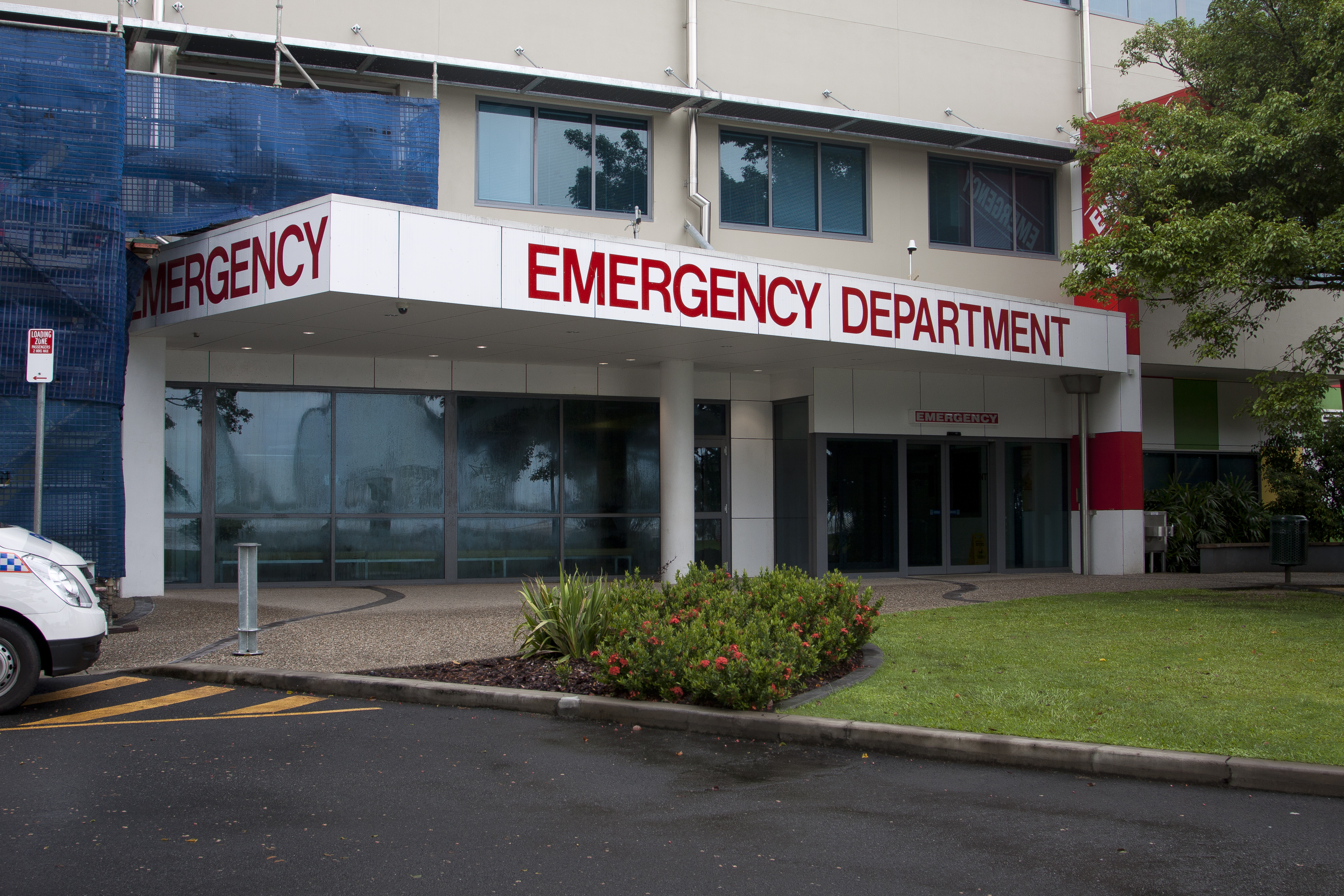
Emergency department entrance, 2012

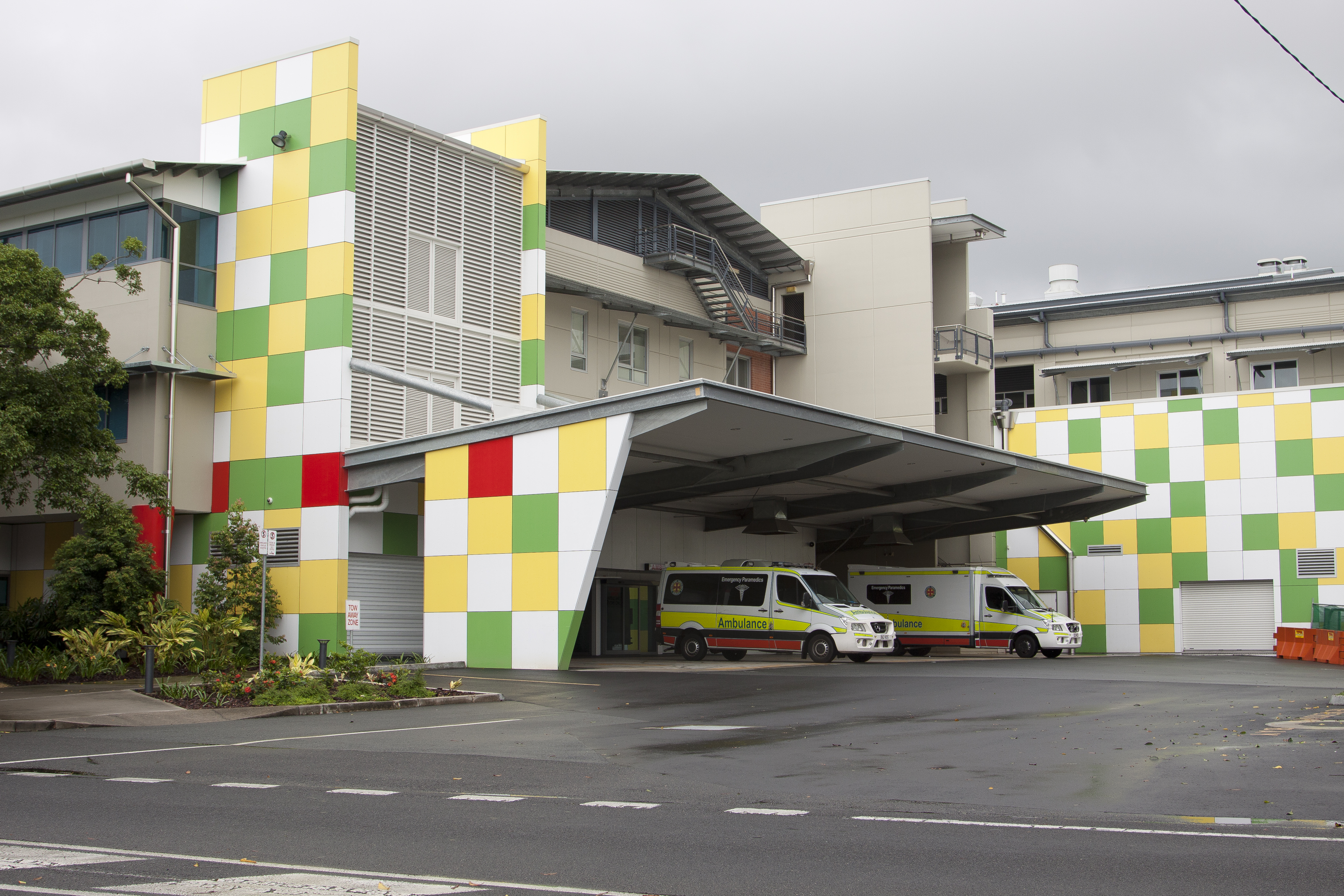
Ambulance entrance, 2012
