= Herries Private Hospital =

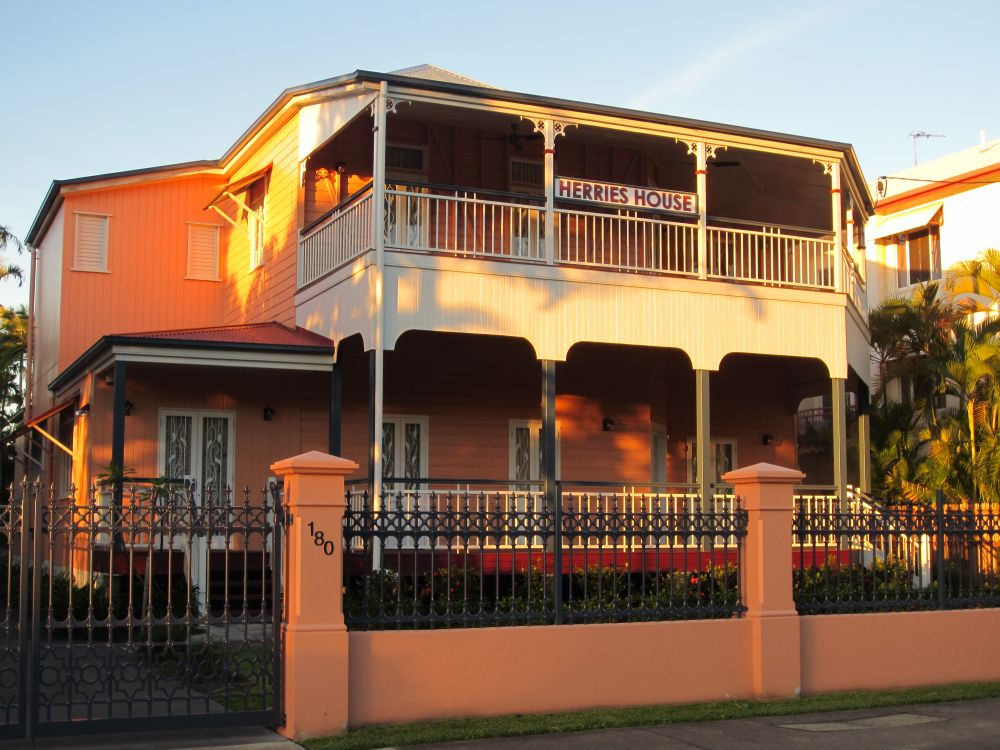
- Herries Private Hospital, 2015

- Location within Queensland Location within Australia
- 16.9149°S 145.7651°E
- Location: 180 McLeod, Cairns North, Cairns Region, Queensland, Australia

History
- Design period: 1919–1930s (interwar period)
- Built: 1880s circa – 1920

Queensland Heritage Register
- Official name: Herries Private Hospital
- Type: state heritage (built)
- Designated: 28 July 2000
- Reference no.: 602137
- Significant period: 1880s circa, c. 1920 (fabric); 1920s–1930s (historical, social)
- Significant components: toilet block/earth closet/water closet, air raid shelter, fence/wall – perimeter, residential accommodation – quarters

Herries Private Hospital is a heritage-listed former maternity hospital and now private home at 180 McLeod, Cairns North, Cairns Region, Queensland, Australia. It was built from 1880s circa to 1920. It is now known as Herries House. It was added to the Queensland Heritage Register on 28 July 2000.

== History ==
Herries Private Hospital is situated at 180 McLeod Street, North Cairns, opposite the Cairns Pioneer Cemetery. It is an enclosed wooden building moved to its present site from Cooktown in 1920. It was owned by Janet Abercombie Herries, a nurse and midwife, who ran it as a private hospital from 1921 to 1938.

Matron Herries was born Janet Abercombie Mackie in Glasgow, Scotland on 29 August 1869. She trained as a nurse but became ill and was advised, for her health's sake, to live in a warmer climate. She emigrated to Australia and worked as a nurse in North Queensland, marrying Robert Herries in 1902, in Mossman. They had four sons and, when the family moved to Cairns in 1916, Janet Herries took a lease on a two-storey house in Bunda Street. In 1918, at the urging of many local doctors, she opened one of the first private hospitals in Cairns, at the Bunda Street house. The hospital cared for nine or ten patients at a time, both maternity and general. The hospital section was upstairs and the family lived on the ground floor.

The land at 180 McLeod Street, Cairns, was first purchased at auction on 20 September 1888 for £27. The vacant land was sold seven times after that, before being purchased by Mr Francis Albert Blucher, in 1918. In 1920 the building in question was transported from Cooktown and re-erected on the McLeod Street site. It is suggested that this building had originally been a fashion house known as "Miss Timony's Premises" and had been situated on the corner of Charlotte and Walker Streets in Cooktown. This is borne out by the truncated front of the building which gives the appearance of being a corner business premises.

When the lease on the Bunda Street premises expired in 1920 Matron Herries leased 180 McLeod Street from Mr Blucher, opening her hospital in November 1920. On 20 December 1921, the Cairns Town Council records the registration of a private hospital by Janet Abercrombie Herries. While Matron Herries was in residence, the Cairns Post advertised the property for sale as:

"...two storey building ... 10 bedrooms ... The property is known as Nurse Herries Hospital and is occupied by Nurse Herries who is a first-class tenant and is willing to take a long lease."

It was bought by Mrs Charlotte Mary Cato on 23 October 1923, who later sold it to Mrs Herries on 26 May 1924.

Herries' Private Hospital catered for nine to ten patients at a time and Matron Herries had women who travelled from Herberton, Mount Garnet and other areas of the Atherton Tablelands, coming to her for the birth of their children. It is said of her that she worked very hard and earned respect and affection from the Cairns community. Many of Cairns' older residents were born in Matron Herries hospital and these people have a strong feeling of attachment and history to the house.

The building had previously suffered damage during the 1907 cyclone in Cooktown. During the 1927 cyclone in Cairns, it was more extensively damaged. A member of the family recalled the roof being blown to the cemetery opposite. After the cyclone, the upper verandah was enclosed with windows and alternate wooden louvres and the roof was lined.

When Matron Herries retired in 1939 the hospital was closed. Her husband, who had worked at the Hambledon, Gordonvale and Babinda sugar mills, died in 1941. Matron Herries lived on in the house with her son Charles, a chemist, until her death on 25 October 1958.

In 1986 during Cyclone Winifred the diagonal front section of the building fell outwards. A builder recommended that the open area on the ground floor and the upstairs louvres be enclosed.

Charles, Mrs Herries' last surviving son, lived in the building until his death in 1996.

In 2014, owner John Westwood spent over $1M to restore the property as a private home known as Herries House. It was previously described as an "eyesore".

== Description ==
Herries' Private Hospital is situated at 180 McLeod Street and is surrounded by holiday apartments. Opposite is the McLeod Street Pioneer Cemetery. Herries' Hospital is a two-storey timber building, polygonal in shape, basically a rectangle with the south-west corner truncated to form another (much shorter) side. It has a hipped corrugated iron roof. At the rear of the building there is a skillion roof extending out over the lower floor from the back wall, it covers the kitchen/bathroom area. The building sits on very low stumps.

The wide front verandahs are enclosed. The front verandah section and core are weatherboard with exposed stud framing - the studs are exposed on the inner wall for the verandahs and the outer wall of the core. The sides of the house beyond the verandahs and the rear are walled by corrugated iron.

The front and sides have regularly spaced casement windows divided by mullions into a large central pane of light blue glass with two smaller panes of plain glass below and above it. At the rear is a row of similar windows on the ground floor but the upper floor has three double-hung windows of mullioned plain glass.

The ground floor is entered by a front door on the truncated southwest corner. This is floored in timber, and is sloping in places. Ahead of the front door is a stairway to the top floor, which is very narrow and steep. Behind the stairway is the toilet and bathroom, at the southeast corner of the building. The downstairs area also contains the kitchen, the toilet and bathroom. The back door opens from the kitchen.

Upstairs, the floor is polished timber. The front verandah is open for the front part of the house, but has been closed in to make a room on the southeast corner. The rest of the floor has a central room with a room behind it to the east and another beside it to the north. The room at the back left-hand corner was the maternity room and the one the right hand corner was the operating theatre.

In the backyard are the remains of an outside toilet, a trellis, a post which may be from a washing line, and the remains of an air raid shelter that is currently used to store bricks. The only vegetation on the block is a large fig tree in the back yard.

The property is fenced by a variety of materials, but the front fence consists of concrete piers set in a low (half a metre) concrete wall joined by panels of galvanised iron pipes with galvanised wire mesh. There is a double gate at the northern end and a single gate at the southern end of the fence. The piers are topped by pyramidal caps painted a pale green, while the piers are cream. This appears to echo the paint scheme of the house, which is cream on the lower storey (though deteriorating) and has the faint remnants of a greenish paint on the upper floor, the weatherboards of which appear to have been scraped back.

== Heritage listing ==
Herries Private Hospital was listed on the Queensland Heritage Register on 28 July 2000 having satisfied the following criteria.

The place is important in demonstrating the evolution or pattern of Queensland's history.

Herries Private Hospital, as a known surviving example of one of the many buildings in North Queensland that were moved from declining mining fields and their associated ports to more prosperous towns, is important in demonstrating the pattern of Queensland's history. It was moved from Cooktown to Cairns, preserving in its polygonal shape its original function as a corner commercial building, with one corner truncated to maximise the street frontage.

Herries Private Hospital is strongly associated with the role of midwives and nurses in Queensland's history. Until recently, few babies were born in hospital. Most were delivered by midwives, either in the woman's own home or in that of the midwife. Every town of reasonable size had a number of these small private maternity homes or hospitals. Many also looked after medical cases not severe enough to be admitted to the main hospital.

The place demonstrates rare, uncommon or endangered aspects of Queensland's cultural heritage.

Herries Private Hospital demonstrates a rare feature of Queensland's cultural heritage by having a private air raid shelter, constructed during World War II, extant in its backyard.

The place is important in demonstrating the principal characteristics of a particular class of cultural places.

Herries Private Hospital is also important in demonstrating the principal characteristics of a private hospital prior to World War II. Private maternity hospitals, owned and operated by midwives, were once common throughout Queensland. The building has remained in the family of the nursing sister who ran the hospital. Its current form also illustrates the common tendency since World War II to enclose verandahs, providing more weather tight space., often in response to cyclone damage. It is otherwise little changed.

The place has a strong or special association with a particular community or cultural group for social, cultural or spiritual reasons.

Herries Private Hospital has a strong association for many of Cairns' older residents who were born in Matron Herries' hospital. She and the hospital are remembered with affection.

The place has a special association with the life or work of a particular person, group or organisation of importance in Queensland's history.

They disappeared from Queensland after World War II, but the nurses and midwives who ran them were once an indispensable group of people who looked after the births of most Queenslanders. Of the hospitals which have survived, few are still identified in the public mind as such. Herries' Hospital is still strongly associated with the midwives and nurses who were so important for the health and well being of Queensland's mothers.
