= Cairns Technical College and High School Building =

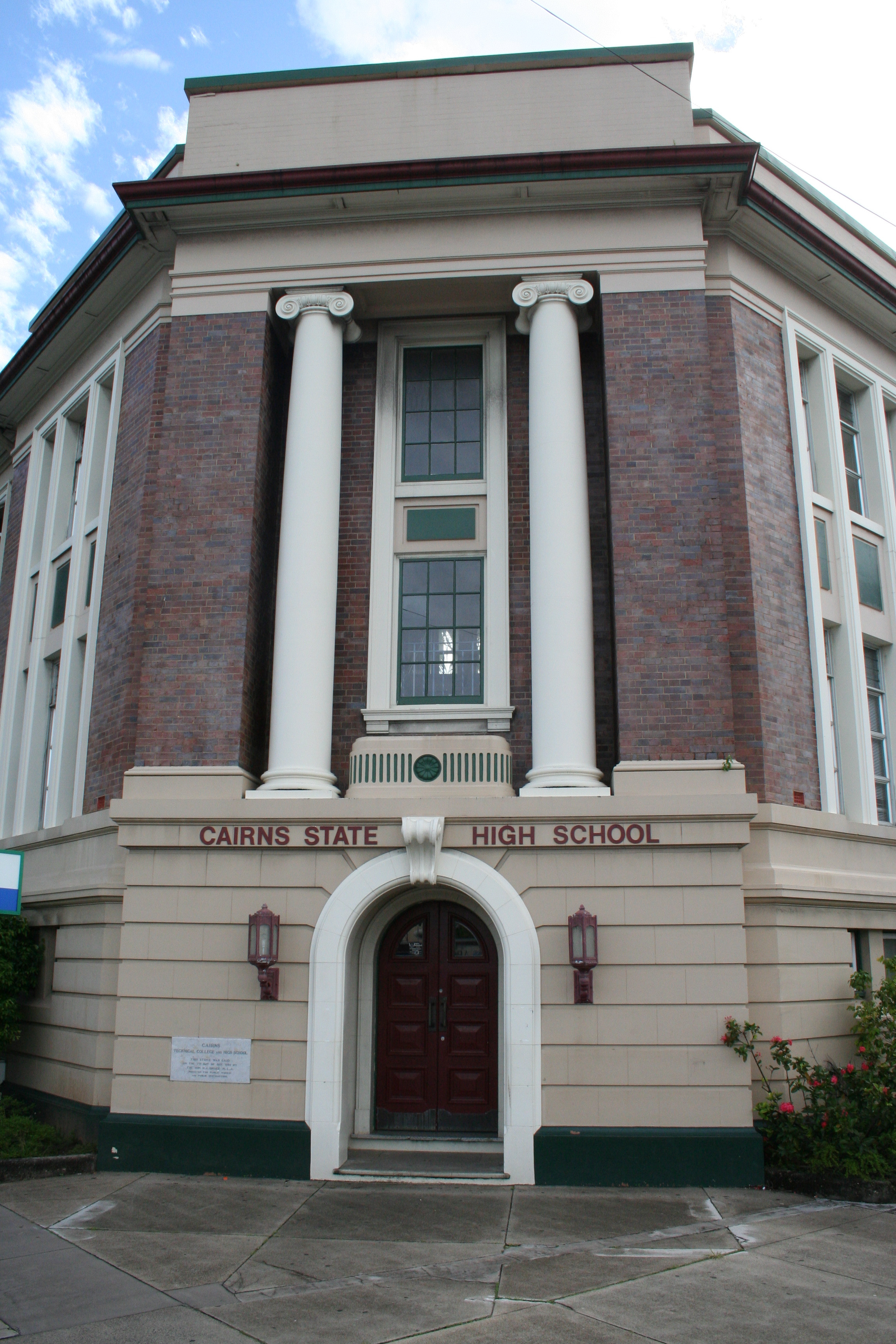
- Corner entrance, Block A of Cairns State High School, 2007

- Location within Queensland Location within Australia
- 16.9164°S 145.768°E
- Location: Sheridan Street, Cairns North, Cairns, Cairns Region, Queensland, Australia

History
- Design period: 1939–1945 (World War II)
- Built: 1939–1941

Site notes
- Architect: Nigel Laman Thomas of Department of Public Works (Queensland)
- Architectural style: Classicism

Queensland Heritage Register
- Official name: Cairns Technical College and High School Building
- Type: state heritage (built)
- Designated: 9 May 2014
- Reference no.: 602834
- Significant period: 1939–1941
- Significant components: classroom/classroom block/teaching area
- Builders: Day labour

Cairns Technical College and High School Building is a heritage-listed state school at Sheridan Street, Cairns North, Cairns, Cairns Region, Queensland, Australia. It was designed by Nigel Laman Thomas of the Department of Public Works (Queensland) and built from 1939 to 1941 by day labour. It is also known as Block A of Cairns State High School. It was added to the Queensland Heritage Register on 9 May 2014.

== History ==
The Cairns Technical College and High School building was constructed in 1941 as a purpose-designed facility for state-run secondary and technical education in Cairns. It was designed by the Department of Public Works as part of the Queensland Government's unemployment relief program during the 1930s and was built using day labour during a period of pronounced construction in Cairns. This commanding, three-storey brick building at the corner of Sheridan and Upward Streets is an important element in the city's streetscape.

State education in Cairns began in 1878 with the opening of Cairns Central State School on Aplin Street.

As in other Australian colonies, the Queensland Government developed standard plans for its school buildings. This helped to ensure consistency and economy. The standard designs were continually refined by government architects in response to changing needs and educational philosophy. Queensland school buildings were particularly innovative in their approach to climate control, lighting, and ventilation. Due to the standardisation of facilities, schools across the state were developed in distinctly similar ways and became complexes of typical components.

Higher education in Cairns was offered by private schools from at least the 1880s. Citizens of Cairns agitated for a state high school from around 1915 and in February 1917 Cairns State High School was established as a secondary department on the grounds of the Cairns Central State School (then called the Cairns Boys' State School).

From their introduction, the design of high school buildings was the responsibility of the Department of Public Works. Initially, high schools were established within existing technical colleges, utilising their buildings to save expense. The first purpose-built high school buildings were constructed in 1917 and were large, elaborate buildings that were variations of a standard design introduced in 1914, as well as vocational education buildings built to standard designs.

By 1918 the high school in Cairns was considered inadequate and a separate high school was requested. At the same time, the Cairns Technical College (a private institute established prior to 1899) was looking to move out of their accommodation within the Cairns School of Arts. The Department of Public Instruction took over the operation of Cairns Technical College, combined it with the high school, and created Cairns Technical High School in 1924. This occurred at other technical colleges in Queensland after the Technical Instruction Act 1908 empowered the government to take over technical colleges run by local school of arts committees. The government had taken an active interest in technical education from the early 1900s. This came from a widespread concern about the growing industrial success of Germany, attributed to its extensive technical education program, and from Queensland's growing manufacturing sector, which created a need for a more skilled workforce in a variety of trades. After 1908 the government expanded their provision of technical education, establishing new colleges in several centres, including Maryborough, Bundaberg, Rockhampton and Mackay. Over the 20th century, the government expanded its provision of technical education to form an integral element of their program. Cairns Technical High School began teaching students from 28 January 1924 in new timber buildings on a large central site on Sheridan Street, officially opened 2 June 1925 by the Minister for Public Instruction, Thomas Wilson. The site had been reserved for a number of civic uses including a school as early as 1910.

Cairns experienced a major phase of development during the 1920s and 1930s. It was declared the City of Cairns in 1923, when it had a population of 8000. This rose to 12,000 by 1933, and 15,700 by 1941. Factors contributing to prosperity in Far North Queensland, and increased building activity in Cairns, included: the Cairns hinterland Soldier Settlement Schemes of the 1920s; the continued success of the local sugar industry; the expansion of wharf facilities; ships bringing tourists from the southern states; the completion of the North Coast railway line to Brisbane in 1924; the opening of the Gilles Highway (1926) and the Captain Cook Highway (1933); the extensive re-building necessitated by cyclones in the 1920s; and the poor condition of earlier timber structures.

In particular, the city centre became dominated by masonry and reinforced concrete structures during the interwar period. Important civic buildings were constructed, most in a Classical architectural style, intended to re-affirm the power and presence of government in the community. These included the Court House (1921), Cairns City Council Chambers (1930), Public Offices (1936), Customs House (1937), and Cairns Technical College and High School. The construction of these buildings by the Queensland Government reflected the confidence in the growth of Cairns as an important regional centre during the interwar period.

As the population of Cairns grew over the interwar period, the existing timber buildings of Cairns Technical High School were unable to accommodate the student population. A new brick building was designed by architect Nigel Laman Thomas of the Department of Public Works in July 1938.This was one of an important group of brick school buildings designed during and immediately after the Great Depression as part of the government's unemployment relief program. This program began in 1932 when newly elected Premier William Forgan Smith instituted a capital works program focussed on building modern infrastructure to provide relief work for unemployed Queenslanders. The "improvement" of schools was a primary aspect of the scheme. The relief work program ended in 1938, transitioning into a permanent, long-term, capital works program. It was under this program that the new brick building for the school was designed and built.

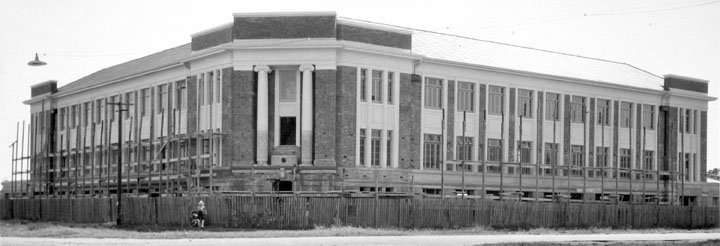
Cairns Technical College, under construction, view from the street, July 1940

The pattern of brick school buildings in prosperous or rising suburban areas that had begun in the early 1900s continued during the 1930s on a much larger scale. The 1930s buildings form a recognisable and important type, exhibiting many common characteristics. Frequently, they were two storeys high above an open undercroft and built to accommodate up to 1000 students. They adopted a symmetrical plan and had Neo-Classical stylistic elements and a prominent central entry. They were able to be built in stages if necessary. The plan arrangement was similar to that of timber school buildings, being only one classroom deep, accessed by a long straight verandah. Ideally, the classrooms would face south with the verandah on the north but little concession was made for this and almost all brick school buildings faced the primary boundary road, regardless of orientation. Classrooms were commonly divided by folding timber partitions and the undercroft was used for covered play space, storage, toilets and other functions. However, the Cairns building is unusual in that it was built on a corner, and also right to the footpath, which increases its streetscape presence.

The Department of Public Works and the Department of Public Instruction in Queensland were extremely enthusiastic about the brick school buildings designed in the 1930s. They were considered monuments to progress embodying the most modern principles of the ideal education environment.

The marble foundation stone of the new brick building for Cairns, which reads "Cairns Technical College and High School", was laid on 7 October 1939 by Henry Adam Bruce, the Minister for Public Works and Public Instruction. The building was constructed using day labour and cost over £30,000 and was officially opened 5 February 1941 by Attorney General, John O'Keefe. It was described as "magnificent" and a reminder that "education and democracy go hand in hand". The school continued to use the old timber buildings, which were altered to accommodate a new intermediate school. Also, new technical college workshops for engineering and plumbing trades were completed, and tennis courts were added to the grounds. The school was the only purpose-built state high school north of Townsville until 1960.

The new building had two long, narrow wings forming an L-shape abutting the Sheridan and Upward Street boundaries, with a prominent central entry diagonally facing the intersection. Designed in a Neo-Classical style, the three-storey structure was brick and concrete with a hipped roof. The exterior had a rendered base and had upper levels of face brick with rendered dressings. The entry had a round arched opening with giant order Ionic columns above, flanking a tall window into a stair hall. Glazing throughout the building was timber-framed and featured fine, timber glazing bars forming multiple panes.

The ground floor understorey was largely open, providing a protected playing area and also accommodating a teachers' room, a girls' retiring room, and a students' reading room. Toilets for girls and female teachers were located in a single-storey section at the end of the Upward Street wing of the understorey, while toilets for the boys and male teachers were located at the end of the Sheridan Street wing. The first floor housed the principal's room and domestic science rooms (dressmaking room, dining room, cookery room, laundry, and drying room) in the Sheridan Street wing, and a general office, classroom, science laboratory and lecture room in the Upward Street wing. The second floor accommodated five classrooms (three connected by folding partitions), bookkeeping and typewriting rooms, drawing room, and a teachers' room. Hat and coat rooms were on each floor and the building had a central main entrance hall and terrazzo stairs. The classrooms faced onto the streets (south-west and south-east) and circulation was via an 8-foot-wide (2.4 m) verandah on the opposite side (north-west and north-east).

Contemporary reports stated: the building would "appeal to the aesthetic taste, and the dimensions of the building [were] commensurate with the rapid progress of the city, besides being a valuable asset from an educational point of view".

The new building for Cairns Technical College and High School opened during World War II, but the war had only a minor effect on the operation of the school. Cairns became an important supply and repair centre during the war, and a US Army hospital was built near the school on land that in 2014 is the school oval. Also, part of the school site near Grove Street was used as a military prison, and air raid slit trenches were dug in the school's playing fields. While the military presence increased, the civilian population decreased. In early 1942 over one third of Cairns' population evacuated the city. Also, the Queensland Government closed all coastal state schools in January 1942 (although this decision was soon reversed). Because of these factors, Cairns Technical College and High School opened a month late in 1942, with a much-reduced student population. The intended opening of the intermediate school in 1942 was also delayed.

In 1946, memorial prizes were established at Cairns Technical College and High School in honour of past students killed in World War II. Schools in Queensland were a prominent community social focus and often became a location for the addition of war and other memorials. Most often, honour boards for past students killed in war were hung in prominent locations on the walls of school buildings, through money raised from within the local community. These became important places for remembrance ceremonies for the school and wider public. Also, it was not infrequent that Queensland schools received bequests from past students. This was the case at Cairns and the school established honour boards and memorial prizes from funds donated in memory of past pupils, teachers, and local citizens. At times these were considerable amounts, providing for perpetual annual prizes and substantial memorials. Over time, additional memorial boards were erected in the first floor foyer of the Cairns Technical College and High School building, recording the names of Dux winners, head prefects, and champion athletes.

In 1946 M McGrath, principal of the Cairns State High and Intermediate School reflected that the school was "now a very complex institution comprising a technical college, a junior teachers training college, the high school and the intermediate school".

In the 1950s the number of high schools in Queensland increased significantly. Reflecting the connected growth of suburbanisation and a move towards a decentralised population in urban centres, new high schools were located in suburban areas rather than the centre of town. The grounds were large, greater than 12 acres (4.9 ha), providing ample room for sports facilities. The general classroom buildings were the same standard types as used for primary schools but high schools also included purpose-built science laboratories, domestic science buildings, workshops for woodwork and metal work, libraries, and gymnasiums. These were also built to standard plans but were specific to their use and not a continuation of previous designs.

Cairns' population continued to increase in the post-World War II period: rising from 16,644 in 1947 to 21,018 by June 1954, with the percentage increase being greater than any other Queensland city for that period. Post-war migrants from Europe were housed at the Immigration Holding Centre on Hartley Street. The city also expanded physically. The anti-malarial drainage scheme undertaken southwest of Severin Street during World War II allowed the suburbs to expand westwards after the war. Tourism to Cairns also increased in the 1950s and 1960s, with the Great Barrier Reef being promoted as a destination by the Queensland Government. The "Sunlander" rail service, a tourist service between Brisbane and Cairns, began in 1953; an underwater observatory was opened on nearby Green Island in 1954; and in the early 1960s the Bruce Highway was bitumened to Cairns.

After the 1950s, the Cairns Technical College and High School grew considerably and many new buildings were added. Also, alterations to the Cairns Technical College and High School building were made, including enclosing part of the understorey for a tuckshop (1966), and an extension above the toilets of the Sheridan Street wing to accommodate home science classrooms (1972). The extension used bricks similar to those of the 1941 portion but it was in a contemporary style. The addition of floors above one-storey toilets was an occurrence at other brick Depression-era schools and was possibly an intention of the original design, to accommodate future expansion.

Technical education expanded from the 1960s through a concerted push by the Queensland Government. In 1974 all Queensland technical colleges were renamed Technical and Further Education (TAFE) Colleges. In the early 1980s the Cairns TAFE College moved off site to new premises. This allowed the high school to expand into the entire site. The earliest timber buildings were demolished and new buildings were constructed in their place.

In 1990 alterations were made to the Cairns Technical College and High School building including; enclosing the understorey for Special Education rooms, removing and replacing doors and windows, and removing and adding new internal partitions and accordion doors. After 1995, metal awnings were added to the classroom windows of the Sheridan and Upward Street facades.

Over time, many new buildings were constructed at the school. As part of the Australian Government's Building Education Revolution (BER) program, Cairns State High School received funding for the construction of a new multi-purpose hall. The BER program was the key element of the Australian Government's $42 billion "Nation Building - Economic Stimulus Plan", developed in response to the 2008 financial crisis. The hall, standing to the north of the Cairns Technical College and High School building, was completed by 2011.

In 2014 the Cairns Technical College and High School building is known as Block A and continues in use as a teaching building for the school.

== Description ==
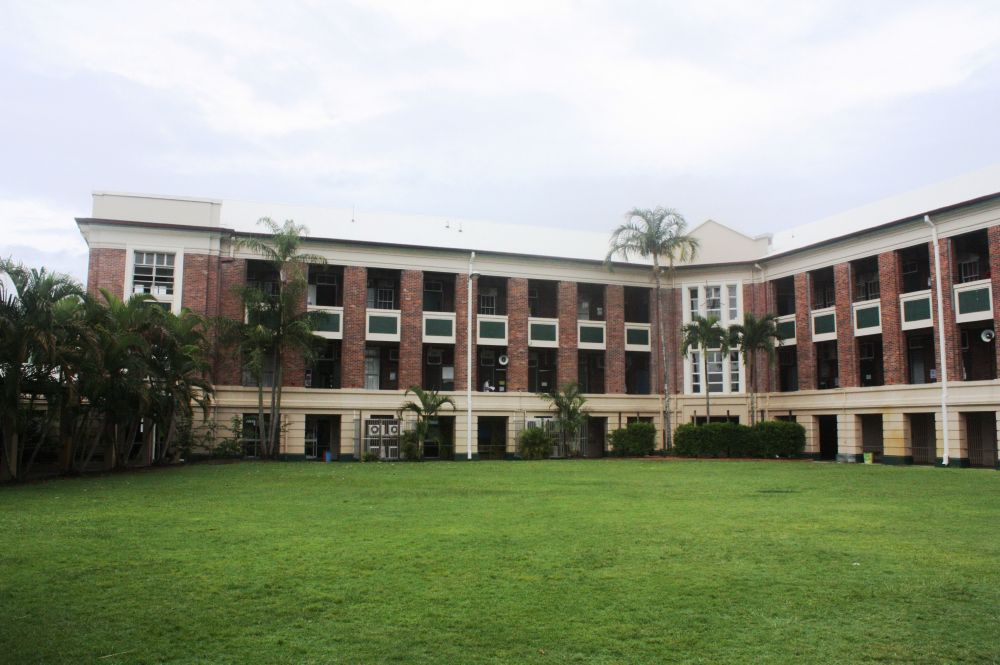
Cairns Technical College and High School Building, 2013

Cairns Technical College and High School is a three-storey building at the southern corner of a complex of buildings of Cairns State High School. Called Block A in 2014, it stands on the corner of Sheridan and Upward Streets, northwest of the nearby Cairns CBD. It is an imposing, brick and concrete structure with two equal wings abutting the street alignment and framing a large, grassed quadrangle behind.

The building's strong street presence is derived from its assertive massing, grand proportions, symmetrical composition, and its cohesive, restrained use of a Neo-Classical style that references 17th Century Italian palazzo and Palladian idioms. Symmetrical around a diagonal corner axis, the building is carefully articulated into two parts: a ground floor podium rendered to resemble channel-jointed ashlar; and glazed facebrick upper floors that are expressed as one, through rendered window detailing that spans both levels. This is capped by a rendered entablature and a projecting cornice. The building is elegantly composed with a central pavilion that accommodates the primary vertical circulation and reception areas, flanking wings that accommodate the classrooms, and end pavilions that accommodate the secondary vertical circulation. The dark brickwork is English bond with a dark mortar and the pale, painted render has high-quality moulding. The aluminium-framed windows and metal hoods to the street elevations are more recent while some ground floor windows retain original decorative iron screens.

The building has a hipped roof clad with metal corrugated sheets and the room layout is arranged with classrooms or offices facing the streets (south-west and south-east sides) and a verandah on the opposite side (north-west and north-east sides) providing circulation.

Flanking the end pavilions are lower sections; a two-storey section at the end of the Sheridan Street wing and a one-storey section at the end of the Upward Street wing. The ground levels of these contain toilets. The first floor (1972 addition) above the toilets on the Sheridan Street wing is not of cultural heritage significance.

Built to the street alignment, the main entrance is through an arched entry set within the truncated corner of the central pavilion. Either side of the entry is a large, metal sconce lamp. Above the entrance are two giant order Ionic columns that flank a tall window into a stair hall inside. The timber-framed window has fine timber glazing bars dividing the sash into multiple panes. The double-leaf entrance doors, which retain original hardware, are timber with glazed panels and prominent moulding. A small entrance hall with a patterned terrazzo floor and rendered walls contains a terrazzo stair with a decorative iron balustrade and clear-finished timber handrail, rising to a first floor foyer at the rear of the building. The ground floor understorey is enclosed to form classrooms, offices, and storerooms. Some original fixtures and fittings are retained.

Two concrete columns with minimalist, stylised capitals frame the entrance from the stairwell into the first floor foyer. This room has a terrazzo floor, rendered walls, and a flat plaster ceiling with moulded plaster cornice. A reception window is framed with clear finished timber and the room is hung with clear finished timber honour boards some of which are memorials to past students, teachers, and local citizens.

Throughout the building, the brickwork has finely-shaped corners and the rendered walls have stop-chamfering. Verandahs run the length of the rear elevations giving access to the rooms and to concrete stairs at each end of the building. The stairs have decorative iron balustrades and timber handrails. The floors of the circulation areas are polished concrete with a painted margin. The walls are face brick and parts retain original ceilings of sheets and battens in a decorative pattern. The verandah wall retains some original timber, double-hung sash windows with fanlights into the classrooms. Air conditioning units have been wall-mounted on the verandah wall and penetrations have been made by removing fanlights. Some doors into the classrooms are original timber double-leaf doors with fanlights.

The layout of the first floor has been altered. Partitions and a suspended ceiling have been introduced and original partitions have been demolished. The first floor retains the general office and the principal's room, but the former classroom, science room and lecture room in the Upward Street wing have been replaced with small offices, and the domestic science rooms in the Sheridan Street wing have been replaced with offices, a print room and a uniform store. The second floor retains classrooms.

The large quadrangle behind the building provides an attractive setting, comprising a flat lawn with perimeter stands of large palms.

The other buildings and structures on the school site are not of cultural heritage significance. The modern covered walkways within the heritage boundary, to the rear of Block A, are not of cultural heritage significance.

== Heritage listing ==
Cairns Technical College and High School Building was listed on the Queensland Heritage Register on 9 May 2014 having satisfied the following criteria.

The place is important in demonstrating the evolution or pattern of Queensland's history.

The Cairns Technical College and High School building, constructed in 1941 (in 2014 called Block A of Cairns State High School), is important in demonstrating the evolution of state education in Queensland and the associated evolution of education architecture.

Purpose-designed to accommodate secondary and technical classes, the place is important in demonstrating the Queensland Government's initial approach to the provision of secondary and technical education in the first half of the 20th century, by accommodating both streams in the same buildings.

Designed as part of the Queensland Government's unemployment relief program of the 1930s, the building is important evidence of this important statewide initiative.

The place is important evidence of the interwar period of prosperity and growth in Cairns, the principal regional centre in far north Queensland. This period in Cairns was marked by the construction of a number of masonry buildings designed in Classical styles.

The place is important in demonstrating the principal characteristics of a particular class of cultural places.

Notable for its substantially intact exterior, the place is important in demonstrating the principal characteristics of a brick school building designed by the Department of Public Works during the 1930s. The principal characteristics include having an expressive and skilful Neo-Classical styling, three-storeyed form, high-quality design, materials and construction, plan layout with north facing verandah, teacher's rooms, hat and cloak rooms, south facing classrooms that are well ventilated and day lit, and understorey play space.

The place is important because of its aesthetic significance.

The place is important for its aesthetic significance and has a dignified streetscape presence brought about by its assertive massing, Neo-Classical styling, and prominent corner location emphasised by an impressive and elegantly-composed facade. The grassed quadrangle to the rear provides an attractive setting for the building.
