= Dr EA Koch Memorial =

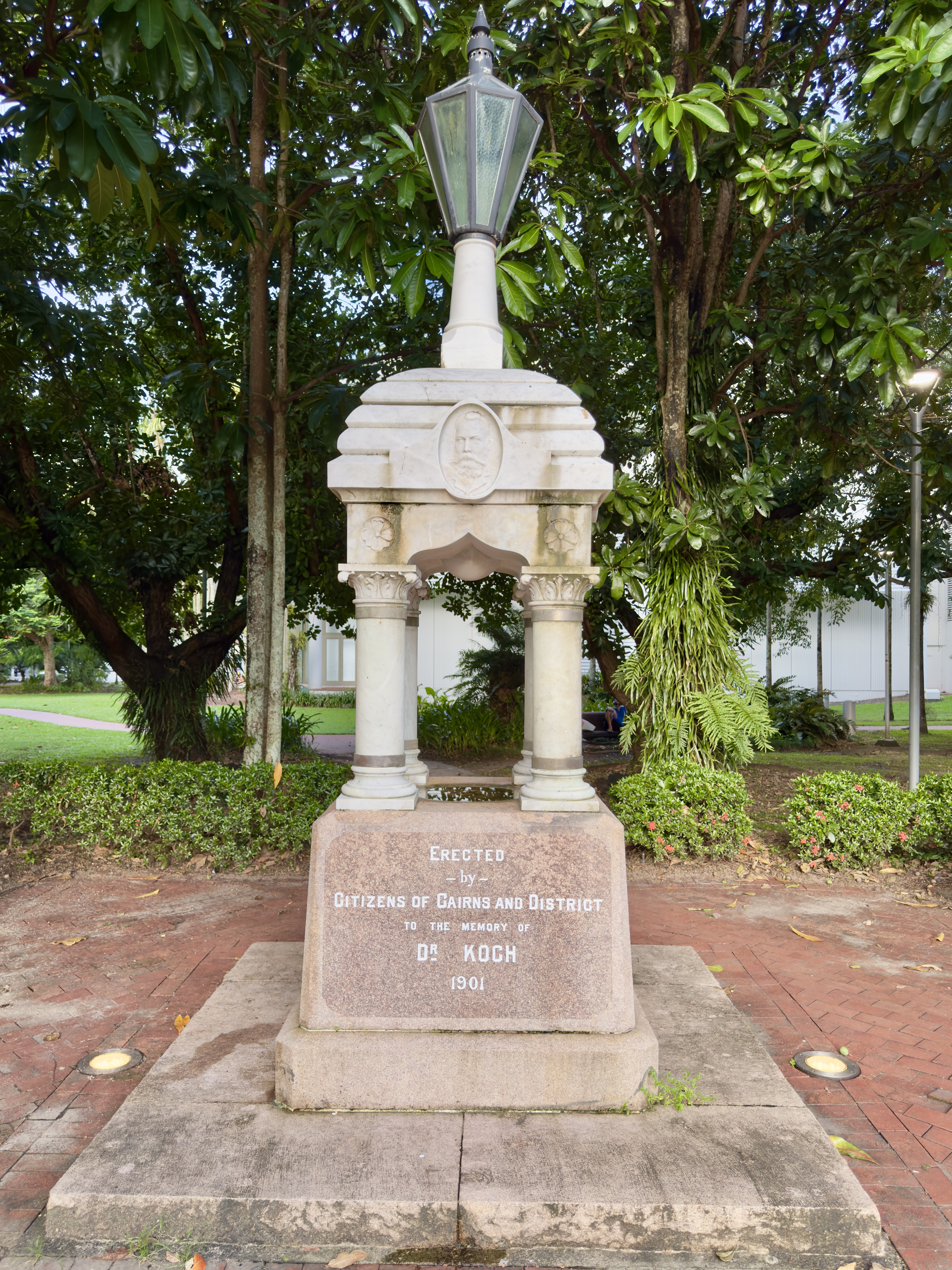
- Dr EA Koch Memorial in Anzac Memorial Park, 2025

- Location within Queensland Location within Australia
- 16.923°S 145.7787°E
- Location: Abbot Street, Cairns City, Cairns, Cairns Region, Queensland, Australia

History
- Design period: 1900–1914 (early 20th century)
- Built: 1903

Site notes
- Architect: Melrose & Fenwick

Queensland Heritage Register
- Official name: Dr EA Koch Memorial
- Type: state heritage (built)
- Designated: 27 May 1997
- Reference no.: 601681
- Significant period: 1900s (fabric); 1903–c. 1970 (historical, first location)
- Significant components: memorial – drinking fountain, lamp/s, sculpture

Dr EA Koch Memorial is a heritage-listed memorial at Abbot Street, Cairns City, Cairns, Cairns Region, Queensland, Australia. It was designed by Melrose & Fenwick and built in 1903. It was added to the Queensland Heritage Register on 27 May 1997.

== History ==
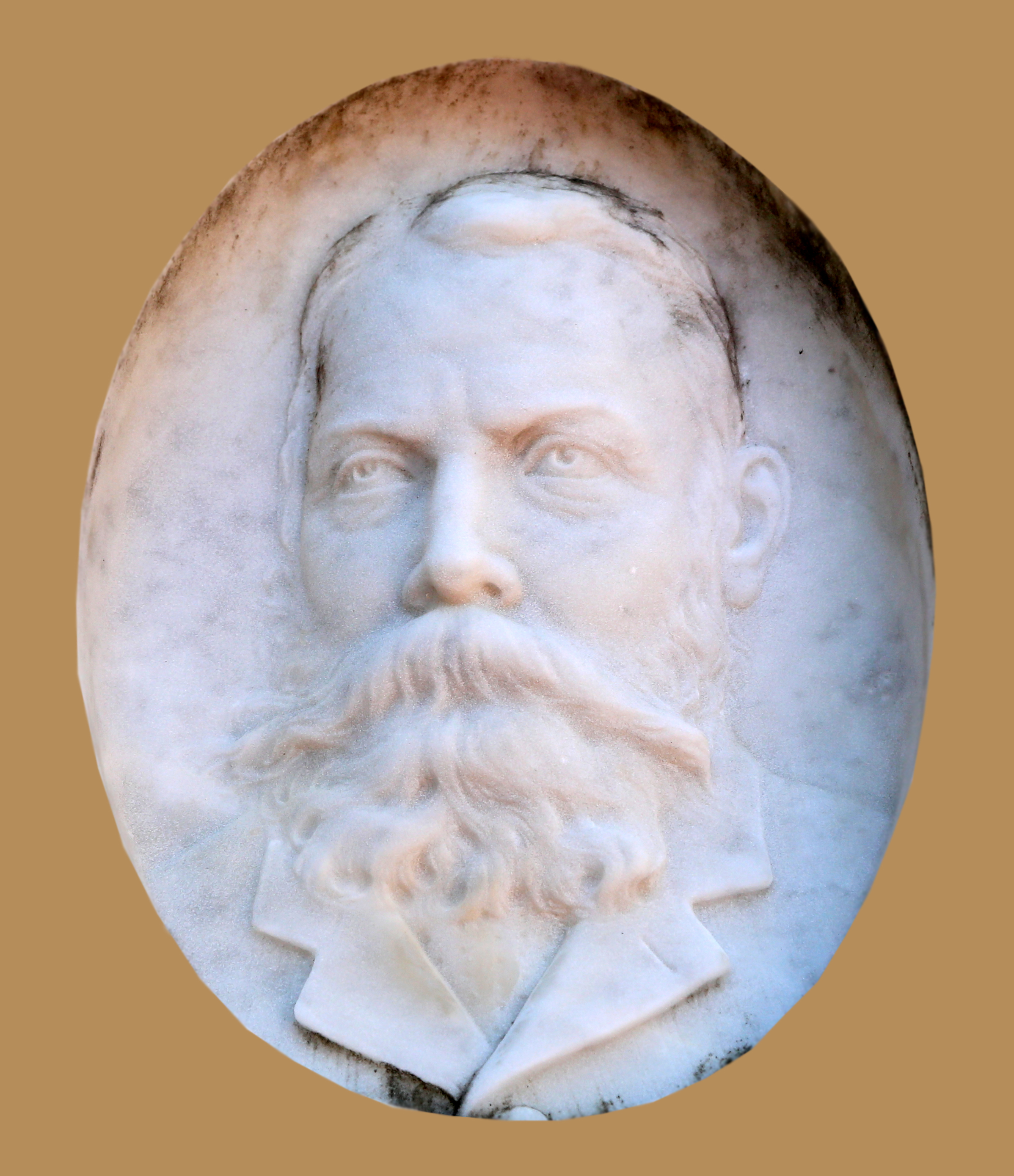
Edward Albert Koch

The memorial to Dr Edward Albert Koch was erected in 1903 by the citizens of Cairns, to honour his work in tropical medicine in Cairns and district in the late 19th century. Dr Koch was for many years in charge of Cairns hospital and had his own practice in the town. Skill and kindness made him a revered figure in the local community.

EA Koch was born in Altona, Holstein in Germany in 1843. He studied medicine at Kiel University and received his degree in Berlin in 1870, the year of the German invasion of France. Koch was obliged to join the army, where he worked as a medical officer. Subsequent to the Franco-Prussian war he appears to have worked in German surgical departments prior to taking a position as Surgeon Superintendent on a German emigrant ship to Queensland in mid-1877. Koch accepted at least two similar positions on German and British immigrant ships to Queensland and New South Wales 1877–1879. In January 1879 he was granted a first-class certificate to practice medicine by the Queensland Government, and in April 1882 he took the Oath of Allegiance in Cairns, where it appears he was in private practice. He was appointed as a medical officer at Cairns Hospital in July 1882, and in April 1884 he also was appointed Health Officer at Cairns, taking over the running of the hospital.

As well as his job as a medical and health officer, from September 1896 Dr Koch was appointed surgeon to the Queensland Military Defence Force's Naval Brigade at Cairns, and in September 1897 accepted the position of visiting surgeon to Cairn's prison. Both these positions were unpaid. He appears to have remained in these positions until his death on 28 June 1901.

Dr Koch gained prominence locally for his medical skills, kindly disposition, and humanitarian work amongst Cairns families. Of particular importance for far north Queensland was his understanding and successful treatment of tropical fevers, notably malaria. "Fever" - usually malaria or typhoid - became endemic in far north Queensland during the 1880s, especially on the mining fields, in the railway construction camps, and on the sugar plantations. Diagnosis was largely the result of observation and deduction, and treatment was empirical. When the fever was malaria, quinine was used to good effect. When typhoid, and quinine did not prove as effective, the diagnosis was often "prolonged or continued climatic fever". More complicated fevers were sometimes described as typho-malaria.

In the 1880s Dr Koch was among the first to understand the role of the mosquito as the carrier of the malaria parasite. Not until 1897 did Major Surgeon Ronald Ross prove by scientific experiment the role of the mosquito anopheles farauti (indigenous to Cairns and all of north Queensland from Townsville northwards) in the transmission of malaria, and it was not until 1904 that RA O'Brien, who practised medicine in Cairns 1904–08, for the first time demonstrated malaria parasites microscopically in North Queensland. Koch patented a fever mixture consisting of quinine dissolved in diluted sulphuric acid, designed both to treat malaria and to be used as a suppressive. 'Dr Koch's Celebrated Fever Mixture for Malaria', prepared by a Cairns chemist, proved highly effective. It was marketed throughout the far north of Queensland and in Papua New Guinea, and is credited with containing the endemic malaria existing in Cairns prior to the Second World War.

Besides formulating the fever mixture, he urged preventative measures, and regularly visited the gangs of workmen engaged in filling the swamps around Cairns, to urge them to roll down their shirt sleeves from 4pm onwards each day. He also visited fortnightly the Hambledon and Pyramid sugar plantations outside Cairns, which were run with South Sea Islands labour.

Dr Koch died on 28 June 1901, aged 57 years, at his residence on the Esplanade at Cairns, and was interred in the McLeod Street Pioneer Cemetery the following day.

To honour the memory of their esteemed physician, a public subscription was raised in Cairns to fund a memorial which would be not only aesthetically pleasing, but functional, and Messrs Melrose and Fenwick of Townsville were commissioned to design a memorial in the form of a drinking fountain. As it was to be located in the centre of the intersection of Abbott and Spence Streets in the heart of the town, a gas lamp was placed on its top.

When completed, the memorial stood 14 feet (4.3 m) high, with a dome supported by four worked marble columns, supported by a polished granite die. On two sides of the dome were sculptured likenesses of Dr Koch. The marble columns and sculptured work were imported from Carrara in Italy. The granite for the die and plinth came from Mount Elliot, near Townsville - that used for the die was polished to a mirror-like finish, while that of the plinth was "fine-axed".

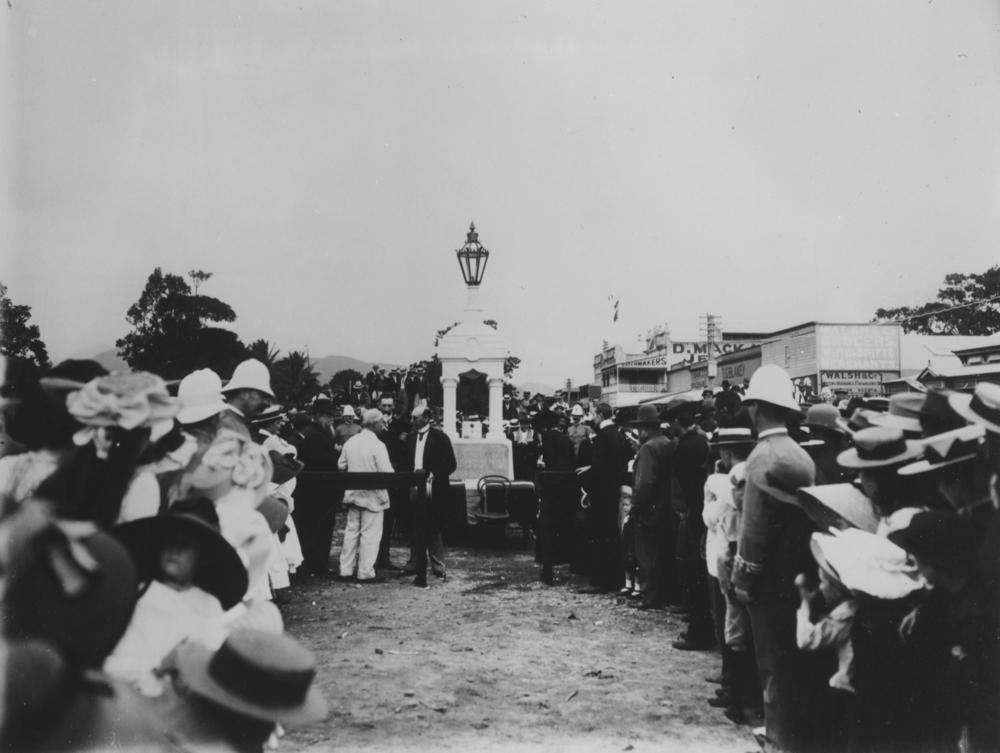
Unveiling the memorial, 1903

The memorial was still in the Townsville workshops in late May 1903 but was in place at the intersection of Abbott and Spence Streets by 13 June 1903, when it was unveiled by Major-General Sir Herbert Chermside, the Governor of Queensland. By c. 1920, the memorial also carried two street signs. By the late 1920s the single lamp and lamp base at the top of the dome had been replaced with a pair of gas street lamps suspended from a tall metal column. By the late 1940s, the lamps and lamp fitting at the top of the dome had been removed entirely. Photographic evidence suggests that the memorial remained in the centre of the intersection until at least the mid-1960s, but had been removed to nearby Anzac Memorial Park (bounded by Abbott and Spence Streets and the Esplanade), by the mid-1970s. It was relocated within this park following redevelopment of the reserve in the mid-1990s.

== Description ==
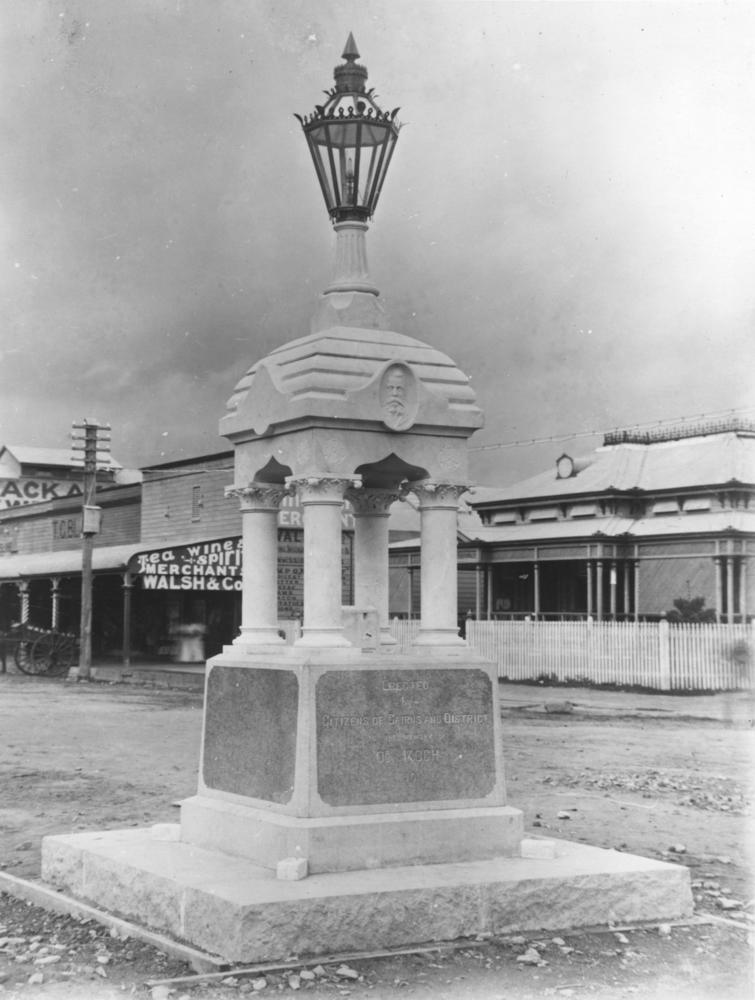
Memorial to Dr. E. A. Koch in Cairns, ca. 1903

The Dr EA Koch Memorial is located in Anzac Memorial Park, in the west corner of the park close to the intersection of Abbott and Spence Streets. It is set against the backdrop formed by The Reef Hotel Casino complex.

The memorial comprises a square, rough-finished granite plinth, on which rests a square polished granite base approximately 1 metre (3 ft 3 in) high, supporting four worked marble columns which in turn support a dome. On two sides of the dome are sculptured likenesses in Carrara marble of Dr Koch. On two faces of the polished granite base is the inscription:

Erected by citizens of Cairns and District to the memory of Dr Koch 1901.

Above the dome is a recent lamp fitting and lamp approximating the original.

The whole is surrounded by red concrete-block paving.

== Heritage listing ==
Dr EA Koch Memorial was listed on the Queensland Heritage Register on 27 May 1997 having satisfied the following criteria.

The place is important in demonstrating the evolution or pattern of Queensland's history.

This memorial immortalises the work of pioneering Cairns doctor Edward Albert Koch, in particular his treatment of malaria and early recognition of the role played by mosquitoes in transmitting the disease. Dr Koch's fever remedy and preventative measures played a significant role in controlling endemic malaria in far North Queensland in the late 19th century and first half of the 20th century.

The place is important because of its aesthetic significance.

The memorial also makes an aesthetic contribution to Anzac Memorial Park and to the streetscape at the intersection of Abbott and Spence Streets.

The place has a strong or special association with a particular community or cultural group for social, cultural or spiritual reasons.

It has a special association for the people of Cairns as physical evidence of the city's history and sense of identity.

The place has a special association with the life or work of a particular person, group or organisation of importance in Queensland's history.

Dr Koch was admired and respected by past generations, and the memorial survives as evidence of this.
