= World War I Cenotaph, Mackay =

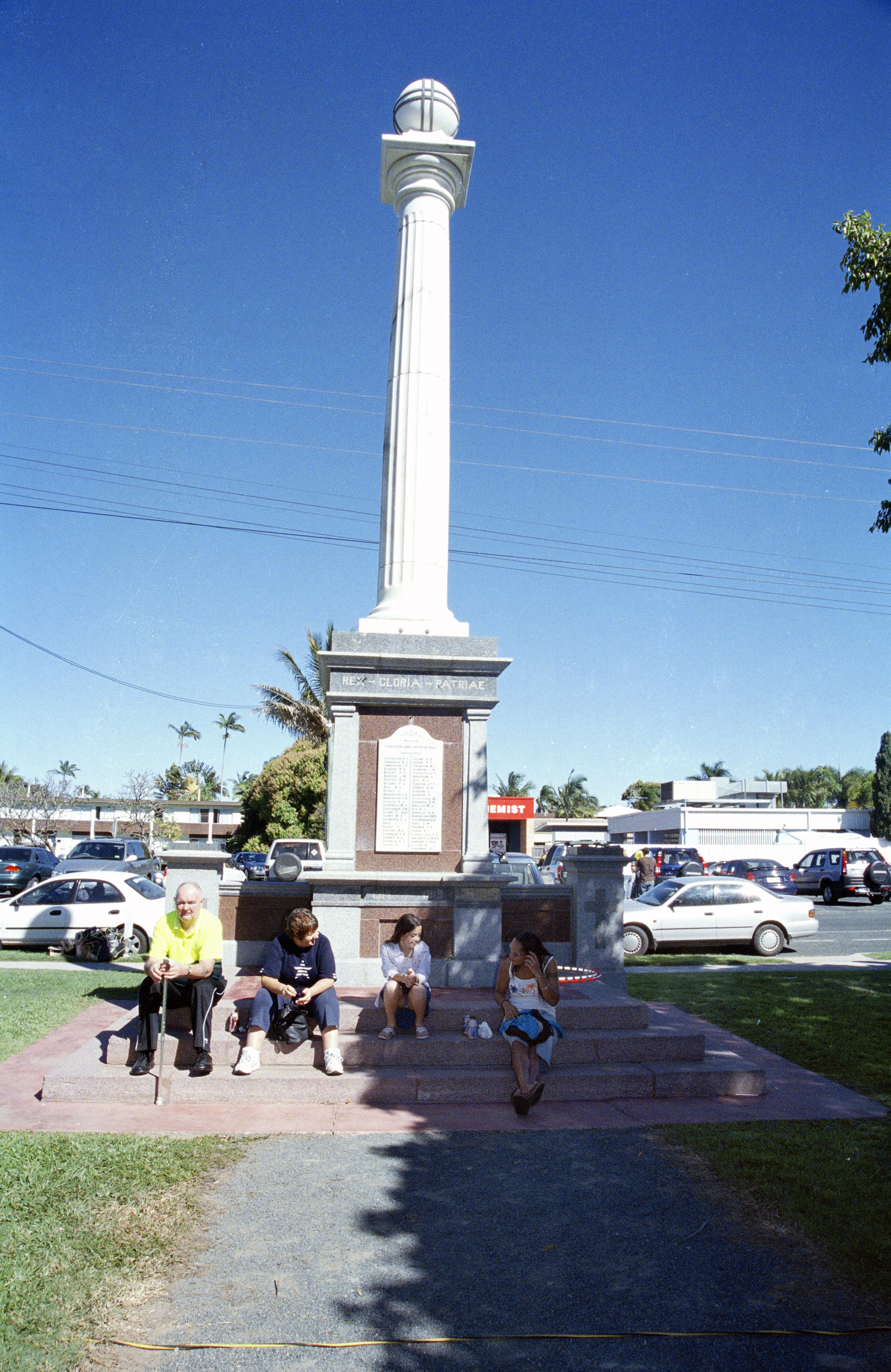
- Mackay war memorial, 2005

- Location within Queensland
- 21.1443°S 149.181°E
- Location: Jubilee Park, Alfred Street, Mackay, Mackay Region, Queensland, Australia

History
- Design period: 1919–1930s (interwar period)
- Built: 1928–1929

Site notes
- Architect: Stephen Harvey
- Architectural style: Classicism

Queensland Heritage Register
- Official name: World War I Cenotaph and Jubilee Park
- Type: state heritage (built)
- Designated: 21 August 1992
- Reference no.: 600667
- Significant period: 1928– (social); 1928–1973 (historical); 1928–1929 (fabric)
- Significant components: memorial surrounds/railings, memorial – column and orb
- Builders: Melrose & Fenwick

World War I Cenotaph is a heritage-listed memorial at Jubilee Park, Alfred Street, Mackay, Mackay Region, Queensland, Australia. It was designed by Stephen Harvey and built from 1928 to 1929 by Melrose & Fenwick. It is also known as Mackay War Memorial and Jubilee Park. It was added to the Queensland Heritage Register on 21 August 1992.

== History ==
The Cenotaph at Mackay was first unveiled on the southern bank of the Pioneer River adjacent to the Sydney Street Bridge in 1929. It was designed by Townsville architect Stephen Harvey and commemorates the 159 men from Mackay and its district killed in action during World War I (WWI). In 1945 the memorial was moved to the northern edge of Jubilee Park, which had been constructed during 1935–6 to honour the jubilee of King George V, on the southern half of a block bounded by Albert, Wellington, Gordon and Nelson Streets. Again, in 1973 when the Mackay City Council was planning its civic centre complex, the cenotaph was moved to the opposite side of the park fronting Albert Street. Here it has remained as a focus for Anzac and Remembrance Day services, other war memorials having since been erected around it.

Mackay, briefly called Alexandra, was named after John Mackay who led the European discovery and settlement of the Pioneer River and its district. The township was surveyed in June 1863, with the first allotments being offered for sale in Bowen in October. Two years after Mackay's establishment, the first sugar cane was planted on the Pioneer Plantation, introducing to the region its key agricultural product and industry. The settlement and the port declared there otherwise served the district's pastoral industry. The first local government body formed in the region, the Mackay Municipal Council, held its inaugural meeting on 1 December 1869. Mackay was declared a town in 1902 and then a city in 1918.

The pre-Federation defence force drawn from the male citizenry of Mackay and its district formed a company of the famous Kennedy Regiment, which was the first Australian infantry unit mobilised at the outbreak of WWI (1914–1918). Many of its members volunteered to join the First Australian Imperial Force and a number distinguished themselves during the conflicts at Gallipoli and in France.

From Mackay, 1,594 men volunteered to serve, with another 36 coming from the nearby Nebo district. Mackay's cenotaph lists the names of 159 who were killed during active service; eight of whom were awarded military decorations.

Australia and Queensland in particular, had few civic monuments before WWI, the memorials erected in its wake becoming our first national monuments, recording the devastating impact of the war on a young nation. Whereas the few memorials commemorating the deaths associated with the Boer War (1899–1902) had been sited in cemeteries, these were erected at prominent sites in towns and cities around the country where they would serve as aides to memory. Memorials took a range of forms other than statuary, including honour boards, memorial gates and halls, and avenues of trees. Australia lost 60,000 lives from a population of about 4 million, representing one in five of those who served. No previous or subsequent war has made such an impact on it.

Even before the end of the war, memorials became a spontaneous and highly visible expression of national grief. To those who erected them they were sacred; substitute graves for the Australians whose bodies lay in battlefield cemeteries in Europe and the Middle East, British policy having decreed that its Empire's war dead were to be buried where they fell. The word cenotaph, commonly applied to war memorials at the time, means "empty tomb". As well as being symbols of national mourning these memorials were also affirmations of nationhood, the new nation and its army having proved its value on an international stage.

War memorials provide valuable evidence of a community's involvement in the war; not so readily obtainable from military records, or from state or national listings, where names are categorised alphabetically or by military unit. Australian war memorials are also valuable evidence of imperial and national loyalties, at the time not seen as conflicting; the skills of local stonemasons, metalworkers and architects; and of popular taste.

Before the construction of the Mackay cenotaph in 1929, Anzac Day in the city was commemorated by a procession of returned servicemen and the gathering of crowds around a Cross of Sacrifice, a temporary structure usually placed in a central location. Wreaths and floral tributes were laid around the cross and a simple ceremony performed, with music provided by local bands and speeches given by local dignitaries. By the mid-1920s a Fallen Soldiers Memorial Committee had formed to raise funds and organise the design of a more permanent monument, comprising about 20 members, including Mr G Hoffman, a returned soldier.

Several sites for this monument were considered by the committee, the preferred option being to secure a portion of the drill shed grounds for a memorial park and erect it there. Bounded by Gordon, Nelson, Alfred and Wellington streets, the area occupied by the drill shed and its grounds had always been intended as public open space, labelled a "square" in the first survey of the new township of Alexandra (later Mackay) by Surveyor Thomas Henry Fitzgerald in 1863. In 1881 the land was gazetted as a temporary drill shed ground reserve and had passed to the Commonwealth Government around the time of Federation for use by its Defence Department. Since the early 1920s the City Council had made several attempts to regain control of the land, bringing the matter before Prime Minister Stanley Bruce during his visits to Mackay in 1924 and 1927. But the conditions imposed by the Defence Department for releasing it, involving land swaps and improvements to the site, proved to be beyond the means of the council. Thus the memorial committee relinquished the drill shed site and an alternative one was chosen on a small reserve on the southern bank of the Pioneer River, opposite the Customs House and next to the Sydney Street Bridge (approx 21.1391°S 149.1870°E).

In April 1928 it was announced that the design of Archibald Selwyn Harriss, a young architect working in Mackay, had been chosen for the monument. It was described in the Mackay Daily Mercury as "a vertical design with four steps supporting a beautiful column of polished granite 30 ft (9.144 m) high". Tenders were advertised in various newspapers, including the Brisbane Courier; however after tenders closed on 23 May the committee decided not to proceed with Harriss' design. In July, it was reported that a Townsville architect, Mr Stephen Harvey, had visited Mackay and submitted a design for the monument, which was accepted. His design, of matching height to the earlier one, took the form of a column of white marble on a granite base. During a subsequent visit Mr Harvey measured levels at the River Street site before returning to Townsville to finalise details in preparation for calling tenders. These were advertised in late July.

Stephen Harvey was born in Sussex, England in c. 1878 and immigrated to Australia with his family in 1912–13. A joiner by trade, he had completed drawing and construction courses, and became an instructor in drawing for the Sussex County Council. After working for an architect Harvey began practicing in the early 1900s. Upon arrival in Australia, he worked in Toowoomba for two years before moving to Townsville, where he remained until his death in 1933. During his career in Townsville, Harvey was a well-known local architect who worked on a variety of civic and commercial projects. The Townsville Masonic Temple is one remaining example of his work (completed after his death). In 1918 he designed a large timber Roll of Honour board for the Townsville Town Hall, listing the names of all those who had served from the district (no longer surviving, name plaques alone re-installed in the new Town Hall).

The tender for constructing the Mackay fallen soldiers' memorial was won by the well-known monumental masonry firm Melrose and Fenwick. Established in Townsville in the mid-1890s, Melrose and Fenwick grew to become the leading monumental masonry firm in northern Queensland, with branches in major centres such as Cairns and Charters Towers. The firm enjoyed continued success into the late 20th century and produced many war memorials including the: Finch Hatton War Memorial (erected 1921), Townsville War Memorial clock tower (completed 1924, part of Anzac Memorial Park and adjacent Banyan trees), and Cairns War Memorial (completed 1926).

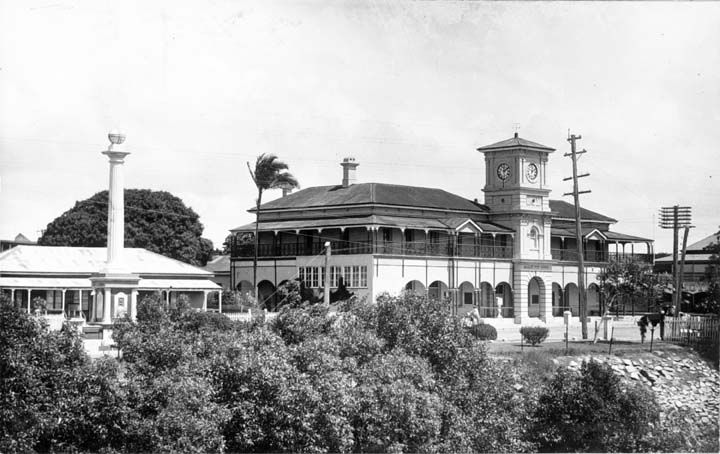
Mackay War Memorial in its original River Street location with the Post Office (now remodelled as the Telstra building) to the right, circa 1936

Mackay's Anzac Day celebrations in 1928 were held at the site of the proposed memorial with crowds filling the surrounding streets and balconies, and lining the Sydney Street Bridge. By November construction was well underway, with Melrose and Fenwick engaged on the stone inscriptions. However, due to shipping delays in Sydney, the foundation stone did not arrive in time for Remembrance Day. A ceremony for its laying was held a week later, a large gathering in attendance. Mr G Hoffman, secretary of the Returned Soldiers League, addressed the crowd, paying tribute to the contributions of the Fallen Soldiers Memorial Committee members such as the Mayor of Mackay, Alderman George Albert Milton, and Mr F Moore, its secretary. The Reverend AD Thorpe blessed the stone prior to its being laid by the Mayor.

The completed monument was unveiled on 24 April 1929, the day before Anzac Day. Its cost was approximately £2,000, of which £1,750 had already been subscribed. As reported in the Mackay Daily Mercury, during the unveiling ceremony the gratitude of the committee was expressed towards the architect, Mr Harvey, who, after supervising the erection of the monument, had forgone his fee. The various parts of the monument have symbolic meaning. The column was approached by three steps, which were always indicative of the approach to a shrine. Then came a solid base foundation surmounted by the plaque bearing the names of the heroic dead. Above that was the strong Doric column on top of which was the round symbol of empire, held in strong bands. Thus the sacrifice of the dead heroes was supported by a strong foundation of Christian faith, with the column of strength and right holding up the empire, which was banded together in bonds of unity.

In addition to these remarks about the cenotaph's symbolic elements, the three steps may correspond to those found on a Calvary cross used to mark Christian graves, which symbolise faith, hope and love (or charity). The granite pedestal was formed like a mausoleum, in this instance empty to recall the men buried where they fell. The pedestal and its flanking wall were decorated with Latin crosses, which are empty to remind observers of the resurrection of Jesus and the hope of eternal life.

The Mackay cenotaph is a good example of a large civic memorial, designed by an architect and crafted by a prominent firm of monumental masons. This type of monument-a pedestal and classical column surmounted by a sphere or orb-is one of a wide variety of symbolic forms employed after WWI throughout Queensland. Many symbols used were already familiar in grave monuments and included urns recalling the ancient Greek practice of placing cremated remains in funerary vessels, and broken columns representing lives cut short. One of the earliest WWI monuments in Australia took the form of a column and surmounting globe; that erected at Manly in Sydney and unveiled in 1916. Other examples of this type in Queensland include the Cardwell War Memorial (1922, masons Melrose and Fenwick) made from sandstone with a cross on top of the orb (symbolising Christian dominion over the world); Graceville War Memorial (1920) made from polished grey granite with a map of Australia and the word "ANZAC" etched on the polished granite ball; the Mitchell War Memorial (1927) with a polished red granite sphere supported by a simple granite column; and the Weeping Mother Memorial at Gatton (1922) made from polished and unpolished trachyte with a wreath around the surmounting globe. In other memorials the surmounting globe symbolised the broader concept of humanity.

The Mackay WWI memorial has some unique features, such as a bronze relief sculpture of the side profile of a helmeted head (symbolism unknown, possibly that of the Greek goddess of wisdom and warfare, Athena), not known on any other monument in Queensland. Also unusual is the low wall flanking the monument, a feature appropriate to its original location on the river bank, which clearly delineates a front to the cenotaph.

Efforts by the council to secure part of the drill shed grounds for a public park continued into the 1930s. The City of Mackay Town Planning Scheme of 1934, Queensland's first town planning scheme that went on to serve as a model for other of the state's cities, recognised the need for the local authority to provide ample recreational areas for the city's growing population. An analysis of its existing parks at the time found them to be inadequate. The drill shed ground was identified in the Town Planning Scheme as an ideal site for a neighbourhood playground, due to its central position in a densely occupied residential area.

These efforts came to fruition with the construction of Jubilee Park during 1935–36, one of several projects carried out in Mackay by depression relief labour. It was built on the southern half of the block opposite the drill shed and was named to commemorate the Silver Jubilee of the reign of King George V. Jubilee celebrations were held in the park on 24 May 1935, when it was officially named by the Mayor, Mr G Moody, and a Jubilee tree was planted by his wife (this tree, a type of kauri pine, no longer exists). The band rotunda was officially opened later in the year on 22 December, again by Mayor Moody, who congratulated the city engineer and workmen for the design, solidity and finish of the structure.

Jubilee Park was laid out in a symmetrical pattern of two concentric paths surrounding the central band rotunda, from which four straight paths radiated out to each corner, along which were planted avenues of palms. Garden beds were sited at each park corner, where the straight paths ended and within the path rings. One bed retains its original sandstone edging; that on the western side of the rotunda. Over time, other memorial plantings were added, such as a large fig tree planted on the Wellington Street side of the park, one of four planted in the city to commemorate the coronation of King George VI in 1937. Coronation Day celebrations on 13 May, which saw over 1000 people gathered in the park to listen to a radio broadcast into the late hours of the night, was one of many large public events held at the park.

By 1945 the site of the cenotaph was being threatened by subsidence of the river bank and it was decided to move it to the drill shed grounds on the northern edge of Jubilee Park on axis with the band rotunda. When re-erecting the monument, the workers filled the base section with concrete. Anzac Day commemorations in 1946 were held at the new site and The Daily Mercury praised the wisdom of the new location and its appropriateness as the setting for the cenotaph.

The park and drill shed existed alongside each other for several decades. In 1965, the Mackay City Council finally became trustees of the land, it being declared in the Government Gazette on 23 October as a Reserve for Local Government (Park and Civic Centre) Purposes.

In the late 1960s and early 1970s, preparations were being made to establish a civic centre complex on the land to the north of the park. A larger area was required than was available there, and it was decided that a school reserve on the adjoining block should be utilised and the section of Nelson Street separating them closed off. The council proceeded with this plan, also acquiring most of the freehold properties on the adjacent block. By 1973, construction of the first stage of the civic centre project, an Administration Building, was underway. In order to make way for this building, the WWI memorial had to be relocated for a second time and was moved to the opposite end of Jubilee Park close to Alfred Street, again on axis with the band rotunda. This time, moving the base of the monument proved very difficult because of its concrete fill added during the 1945 relocation, which had attached it too firmly to the solid foundation. The column was lifted off, but despite a concerted effort with the city's largest crane, wedges and jacks, the base could not be moved. To avoid damaging the monument, a series of holes had to be drilled through the concrete base to weaken its hold on the foundations.]

The Mackay Civic Precinct complex was completed in 1988 comprising the Sir Albert Abbott Administration Building, a library, civic centre and senior citizens building, arranged around a central fountain forming a southerly endpoint to Nelson Street. The library had been sited over the north-eastern corner of Jubilee Park, incurring the loss of some plantings and pathways. More recently an Entertainment Convention Centre has been erected to the east of the park and cenotaph.

Mackay's World War I Cenotaph continues to be the main location for Anzac Day and Remembrance Day ceremonies in the city, attracting large crowds and conducted in a similar way to those of the 1930s. Jubilee Park has also become home to several other war memorials—the Mackay World War II Memorial, 2/12th Battalion Memorial, Vietnam War Memorial, and National Servicemen's Memorial—further enhancing the appropriateness of the setting it provides for events commemorating the sacrifices made during war by the district's servicemen and women.

== Description ==
Mackay's World War I Cenotaph is situated on the southern side of Jubilee Park in the centre of the city. With its tall white marble column rising above the canopies of adjacent trees, it is the most prominent feature of the park and forms part of a formal composition of paths, lawn, mature trees, garden beds, and structures such as a band rotunda and lamp posts. Retaining much of its original form and fabric, the park continues to accommodate many of the activities and events carried out there since its establishment. As a setting for the cenotaph, and several other war memorials, the park provides a tranquil gathering space for large crowds attending memorial services there, appropriate to the solemn nature of these events.

Occupying the south-west corner of a large block of land known as the Mackay Civic Precinct, Jubilee Park is bounded by Wellington Street to the west and Albert Street to the south. The northern edge of the park adjoins the Sir Albert Abbott Administration Building rear car park, while the north-eastern corner is truncated by the Mackay City Library. Along the park's eastern edge is another car park for the Entertainment Convention Centre. The car park areas that fall within the heritage boundary are not considered to be of cultural heritage significance.

The surviving elements of the park's early layout are the central band rotunda, circular paths around it and those radiating to the park's corners, the fig plantings to the west and east of the rotunda, the avenues of palms along each radial path, garden beds terminating its south-western and eastern corners, a sandstone-edged garden bed on the south-western side of the rotunda and eight lamp posts.

Around the central band rotunda are two concentric un-edged gravel paths. From the outer one of these three straight paths radiate to the park's corners. The fourth to the north-east has been removed with the construction of the library. Other changes to these paths include deviations at the ends of those on the north-west and south-east corners caused by the construction of car parks and new associated garden beds. Early palms line the straight paths and figs are grouped together symmetrically on the grassed areas between. Later trees are placed around the edges of the park, leaving the area around the central rotunda open. The park retains eight of its 12 original lamps posts: four surrounding the central rotunda and two each along the southern and western edges of the park.

At approximately nine metres high, the WWI Cenotaph is an imposing feature both within the park and along Albert Street, flanked by two trees, the canopies of which provide shaded gathering areas adjacent to the monument. The monument faces north, towards the band rotunda, with which it is aligned. A gravel pathway connects the monument to the outer circular pathway. The base of the cenotaph consists of three steps of pinkish-red terrazzo around three sides of a rectangular concrete foundation; however, the bottom step now sits level with a recent apron slab with pebblecrete finish. Approximately 60 centimetres (24 in) wide, this slab wraps around the entire monument. Flanking the main pedestal is a low wall with ornamental square pillars at either end. Made from polished and un-polished grey granite, the wall defines the rear edge of the monument and features inset panels of polished red granite. The three outer faces of the pillars have Latin crosses, created by a slightly raised polished surface on a rough background.

The pedestal is a square pillar with simplified classical detailing, made from polished and unpolished grey granite with inset panels of red granite. The base is slightly wider than the rest of the pedestal, displaying the dates 1914–1919 on its northern face. This lettering, etched into the granite, has been recently highlighted with white paint. A thin ledge separates the base from the middle section. The middle section consists of red granite panels framed by engaged square pillars of grey granite at each corner and each face displays a rectangular marble plaque with a curved top. The plaques to the north, east and west bear the 159 leaded names. The top of these three plaques each bear a short statement:

GREATER LOVE HATH NO MAN – FOR LIBERTY AND RIGHT – FOR GOD, KING AND COUNTRY.

The plaque on the southern side, facing Albert Street, displays a bronze relief sculpture of the head of a helmeted soldier above lettering encased within a rectangular border:

THIS MEMORIAL IS DEDICATED TO THE MEN OF MACKAY AND DISTRICT WHO GAVE THEIR LIVES IN THE GREAT WAR.

The corner pillars have simply moulded bases and capitals and are slightly tapered. They support an entablature comprising a large fascia of grey granite and a small cornice. The inscription:

REX – GLORIA – PATRIAE

also highlighted with white paint, is on the northern side of the entablature.

Surmounting the entablature is a tall, fluted Doric column of white marble. Constructed from at least four marble sections joined by mortar, it appears additional fixing to the pedestal is provided by bolts passing through the bottom of the base, two on each side. A dark grey vein running through the marble at an angle gives the impression of a cracked or broken column. The column supports a marble orb with intersecting double meridian lines, made from raised strips of metal.

Jubilee Park's rotunda has an octagonal pyramid roof clad in corrugated metal sheeting, supported on eight round concrete columns with simplified classical detailing at the base and capital. It stands on a raised concrete platform and has concrete steps on the southern side, facing the cenotaph. There is no balustrade and a garden bed runs around the edges. The ceiling is ornamented with a raised geometric pattern with art deco influences. The eight lamp posts are also made of concrete, with a simplified classical plinth and an eight sided, slightly tapered post. The lanterns have been replaced with modern casings but are fixed to an early metal capital.

Additional war memorials have been located within the park, occupying the edges of the south-western corner and facing in towards the rotunda. Closest to the WWI Cenotaph is a World War II memorial of black polished granite with gold lettering. The next memorial consists of two plaques; one dedicated to the members of the 2/12 Battalion of WWII and the other a National Serviceman's Memorial, attached to separate sloping grey granite blocks on a shared, granite-clad base. Backing on to Wellington Street is a Vietnam War Memorial, with a white freestanding cross, white posts marking a rectangular piece of ground, and a brick wall with name plaques attached. A playground with two metal swing sets occupies the eastern side of the park and is not of state cultural heritage significance. Other elements within the park, such as park benches, metal light poles and recent signage, are also not of cultural heritage significance.

A notable characteristic of the park are its mature trees, many dating from the 1930s. Avenues of royal palms (Roystonea regia) line both sides of the straight paths, with the best preserved avenue along that to the south-east. Clusters of mature fig trees stand on the eastern and western sides of the park, three on each side planted in a triangular formation. Providing large shaded areas, the spreading canopies of these trees extend over the road along the western boundary, and over the library building and the adjacent car park on the opposite side of the park. Some of these figs were planted to commemorate significant events. One, a Ficus nitida on the west side of the park, has a bronze plaque attached to a timber sign, stating that it was planted by Mrs G. Moody, Mayoress of Mackay, to commemorate the coronation of King George VI and Queen Elizabeth on 12 May 1937. No other plaques or signs remain. Key sightlines through the park exist along the straight pathways towards the band rotunda, and from the centre of the park towards the Cenotaph.

== Heritage listing ==
World War I Cenotaph and Jubilee Park were listed on the Queensland Heritage Register on 21 August 1992 having satisfied the following criteria.

The place is important in demonstrating the evolution or pattern of Queensland's history.

Funded through public subscription, unveiled in 1929 on the southern bank of the Pioneer River and relocated to Jubilee Park in 1945, the World War I Cenotaph in Mackay, is important in demonstrating the profound impact made on Queensland communities by the great loss of life incurred by Australia's involvement in this war and the ensuing efforts to memorialise those sacrifices. As well as expressing the grief and gratitude of the district for its fallen servicemen, this monument also illustrates the tenor of the new nation's emerging identity.

The place is important in demonstrating the principal characteristics of a particular class of cultural places.

The Cenotaph at Mackay is important in demonstrating the principal characteristics of a monument erected to commemorate World War I and its impact on the new nation of Australia. These characteristics include its composition of symbolic elements-such as the three steps to its base, the mausoleum form of its pedestal, white marble Doric column and surmounting globe-the names of fallen soldiers recorded on the plinth, and its location in a public place. The form and fabric of Jubilee Park serve as an appropriate setting for events focused on the cenotaph and the other war memorials erected nearby.

The place is important because of its aesthetic significance.

The World War I Cenotaph in Jubilee Park at Mackay is aesthetically significant for the accomplished composition of its design elements: the approach to a mausoleum-like pedestal representing the great loss of life incurred during this conflict and the wide-ranging grief expressed in response to the bodies of the fallen not being returned for local burial, its Latin crosses and three-stepped base recalling Christianity, its Doric column evoking the architecture of classical antiquity, and the surmounting globe of white marble symbolising allegiance to the British Empire and pride in the sacrifices made on its behalf by a new nation.

The aesthetic response evoked by this cenotaph is amplified by the high standard of design and workmanship it displays and the multiple viewpoints from which it can be appreciated both from within the park, as an appropriate setting for commemorative events or quiet contemplation, and from Alfred Street.

The place has a strong or special association with a particular community or cultural group for social, cultural or spiritual reasons.

The World War I Cenotaph at Mackay has a strong and enduring connection with the district's community as a symbol of the sacrifices made by its volunteer servicemen during this global conflict. This association has been further enhanced by the installation of later war memorials nearby-the Mackay World War II Memorial, 2/12th Battalion Memorial, Vietnam War Memorial, and National Servicemen's Memorial. The cenotaph and these memorials, as well as the formal setting provided by Jubilee Park and its arrangement of original structures, tree-lined paths, lawn and garden beds, are a focus for events held to commemorate these significant contributions.
