= Stephen Harvey (architect) =

Stephen Harvey (1879–1933) was an English-born architect in Townsville, Queensland, Australia. A number of his works are now heritage-listed.

== Early life ==
Stephen Harvey was born in Sussex, England in 1879, the son of Stephen Harvey and his wife Alice Jane (née Taylor).

He immigrated to Australia with his family in 1912–13. A joiner by trade, he had completed drawing and construction courses, and became an instructor in drawing for the Sussex County Council.

== Architectural career ==
After working for an architect Harvey began practicing in the early 1900s. Upon arrival in Australia, he worked in Toowoomba for two years before moving to Townsville. During his career in Townsville, Harvey was a well-known local architect who worked on a variety of civic and commercial projects.

== Later life ==
Harvey died in Townsville on 1 March 1933.

== Significant works ==
- Mackay Cenotaph (1922)
- Townsville Town Hall
- Townsville Masonic Temple (completed after his death).
