= Edward Albert Koch =

Australian medical practitioner (1843–1901)

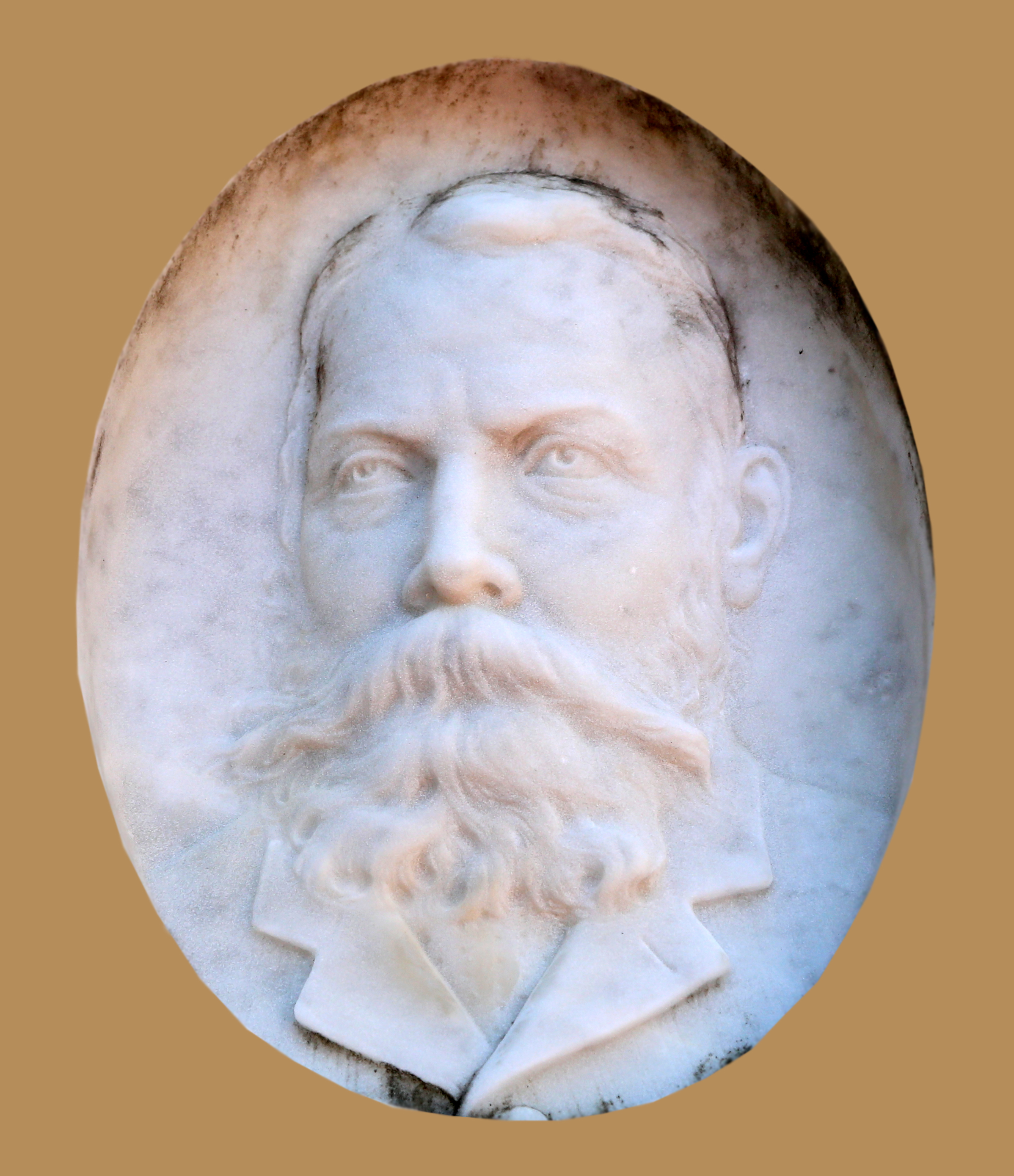
Dr. Edward Albert Koch

Edward Albert Koch (1843 – 28 June 1901) was a German-born medical practitioner in Cairns, Queensland, Australia, known for his treatment of malaria and his early recognition of the role played by mosquitoes in transmitting the disease. Koch's fever remedy and preventative measures played a significant role in controlling endemic malaria in far North Queensland in the late 19th century and first half of the 20th century.

== Early life ==
Edward Albert Koch was born in Altona, Holstein (today part of Hamburg) in Germany in 1843. He studied medicine at Kiel University and received his degree in Berlin in 1870, the year of the German invasion of France. Koch was obliged to join the army, where he worked as a medical officer. Subsequent to the Franco-Prussian war he appears to have worked in German surgical departments.

== Queensland medical career ==
In mid-1877, he took the position as Surgeon Superintendent on a German emigrant ship to Queensland. Koch accepted at least two similar positions on German and British immigrant ships to Queensland and New South Wales 1877–1879. In January 1879 he was granted a first-class certificate to practice medicine by the Queensland Government, and in April 1882 he took the Oath of Allegiance in Cairns, where it appears he was in private practice. He was appointed as a medical officer at Cairns Hospital in July 1882, and in April 1884 he also was appointed Health Officer at Cairns, taking over the running of the hospital.

As well as his job as a medical and health officer, from September 1896 Koch was appointed surgeon to the Queensland Military Defence Force's Naval Brigade at Cairns, and in September 1897 accepted the position of visiting surgeon to Cairn's prison. Both these positions were unpaid. He appears to have remained in these positions until his death on 28 June 1901.

Koch gained prominence locally for his medical skills, kindly disposition, and humanitarian work amongst Cairns families. Of particular importance for far north Queensland was his understanding and successful treatment of tropical fevers, notably malaria. "Fever" - usually malaria or typhoid - became endemic in far north Queensland during the 1880s, especially on the mining fields, in the railway construction camps, and on the sugar plantations. Diagnosis was largely the result of observation and deduction, and treatment was empirical. When the fever was malaria, quinine was used to good effect. When typhoid, and quinine did not prove as effective, the diagnosis was often "prolonged or continued climatic fever". More complicated fevers were sometimes described as typho-malaria.

In the 1880s Koch was among the first to understand the role of the mosquito as the carrier of the malaria parasite. Not until 1897 did Major Surgeon Ronald Ross prove by scientific experiment the role of the mosquito anopheles farauti (indigenous to Cairns and all of north Queensland from Townsville northwards) in the transmission of malaria, and it was not until 1904 that RA O'Brien, who practised medicine in Cairns 1904–08, for the first time demonstrated malaria parasites microscopically in North Queensland. Koch patented a fever mixture consisting of quinine dissolved in diluted sulphuric acid, designed both to treat malaria and to be used as a suppressive. 'Dr Koch's Celebrated Fever Mixture for Malaria', prepared by a Cairns chemist, proved highly effective. It was marketed throughout the far north of Queensland and in Papua New Guinea, and is credited with containing the endemic malaria existing in Cairns prior to the Second World War.

Besides formulating the fever mixture, he urged preventative measures, and regularly visited the gangs of workmen engaged in filling the swamps around Cairns, to urge them to roll down their shirt sleeves from 4pm onwards each day. He also visited fortnightly the Hambledon and Pyramid sugar plantations outside Cairns, which were run with South Sea Islands labour.

== Later life ==
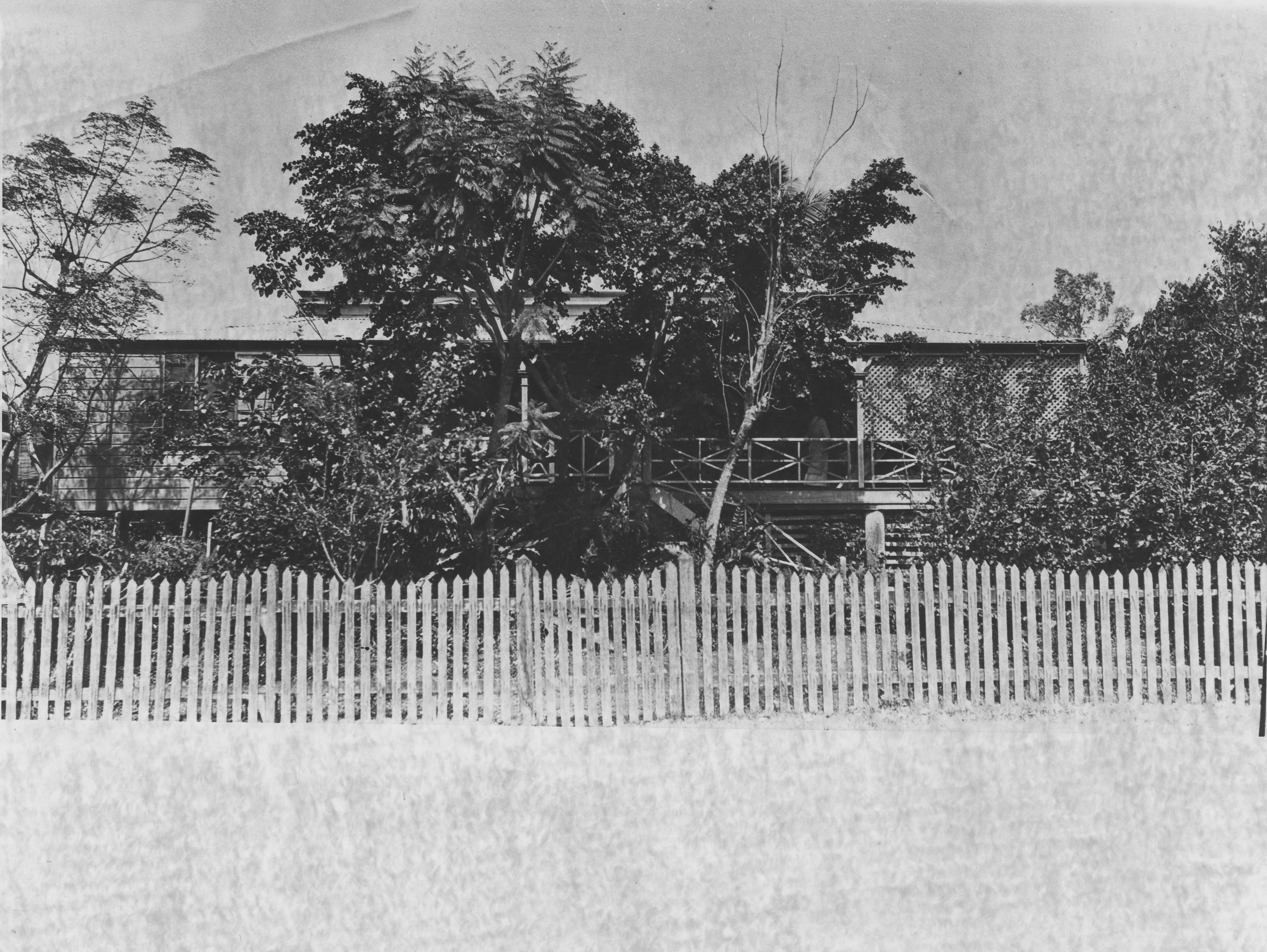
Koch residence on the Esplanade in Cairns ca. 1895

Koch died on 28 June 1901, aged 57 years, at his residence on the Esplanade at Cairns, and was interred in the McLeod Street Pioneer Cemetery the following day.

== Legacy ==
To honour the memory of their esteemed physician, a public subscription was raised in Cairns to fund the Dr EA Koch Memorial to be located in the centre of the intersection of Abbott and Spence Streets in the heart of the town. It was unveiled by Major-General Sir Herbert Chermside, the Governor of Queensland on 13 June 1903. It was later relocated to Anzac Memorial Park in Cairns. The memorial is listed on the Queensland Heritage Register.

In 1995, the Dr Edward Koch Foundation was established as a non-profit organisation for improving public health in North Queensland.
