= Sarina War Memorial =

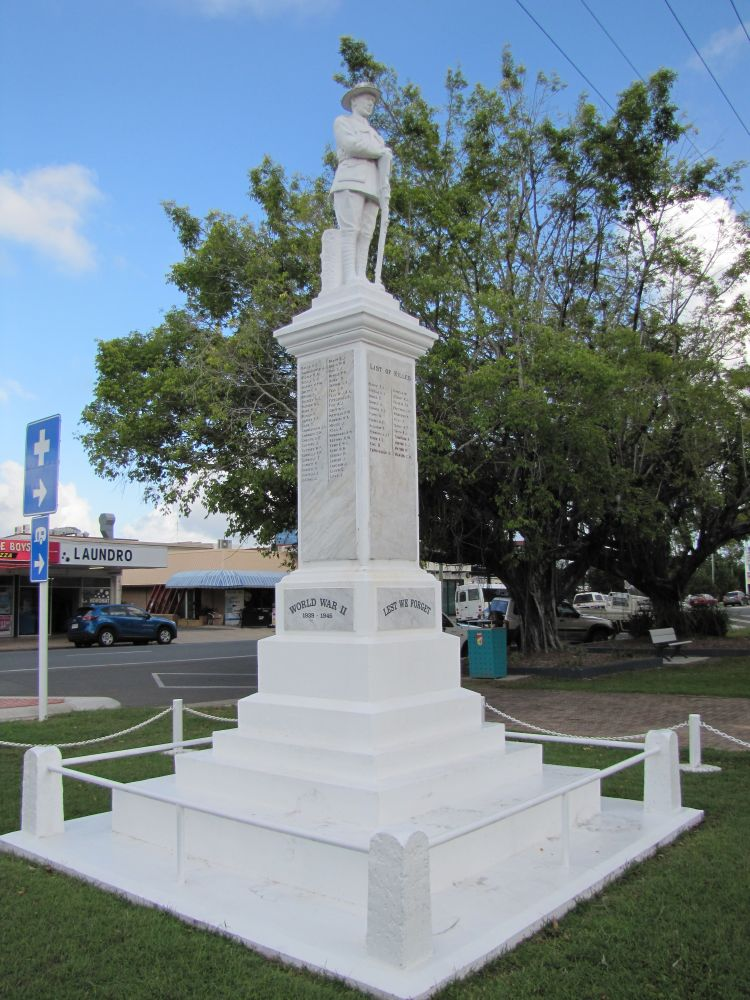
- Sarina War Memorial, 2014

- Location within Queensland
- 21.4243°S 149.2178°E
- Location: Broad Street, Sarina, Mackay Region, Queensland, Australia

History
- Design period: 1914–1919 (World War I)
- Built: 1919

Queensland Heritage Register
- Official name: Sarina War Memorial
- Type: state heritage (built)
- Designated: 5 December 1997
- Reference no.: 601291
- Significant period: 1919– (social); 1919 (historical, fabric)
- Significant components: statue, bollards, fence/wall – perimeter, plaque, memorial – soldier statue
- Builders: Melrose and Fenwick

Sarina War Memorial is a heritage-listed memorial at Broad Street, Sarina, Mackay Region, Queensland, Australia. It was built in 1919 by Melrose and Fenwick. It was added to the Queensland Heritage Register on 5 December 1997.

== History ==
The Sarina War Memorial was erected for the ANZAC Day (25 April) ceremonies of 1919 and was produced by Melrose and Fenwick, monumental masons of Townsville. Funds for the memorial were raised by public subscription. The memorial honours the local men of Sarina and the surrounding district who served in the First World War. The memorial was unveiled on 2 October 1920 by Mrs Lucy Ada Heron, mother of Private Leslie Lionel Heron, killed in action on 7 August 1916.

The town of Sarina is located 35 kilometres (22 mi) south of Mackay and was originally established as a pastoral holding. In the early 1880s, the area was thrown open for selection as sugar cane fields and flourished following the construction of the Plane Creek Sugar Mill in 1896. A supporting infrastructure of schools, theatres and halls was established, as well as residences for both workers and management. The town and mill serviced the southern part of the region and by the 1930s Sarina was the second largest town in the region. It continues to exist as a secondary centre to Mackay.

Up until the early twentieth century, there were few statues or monuments in Queensland. However, as a result of the First World War (1914–1918), memorials were erected in almost every Queensland town. Such public expression of both grief for the dead and pride in the nation has not been generated by previous or subsequent wars.

The First World War had an immense impact on the Australian population. Of those who went to war, almost one in five did not return. It was common for families to lose more than one son and for small communities to lose a whole generation of men.

In 1916 the British Government prohibited the exhumation and return of bodies. This, coupled with the impracticality of visiting distant graves ensured war memorials became an expression of public mourning, revered as cenotaphs (literally meaning 'empty tomb') by those who erected them. Placed at prominent locations, they became symbols of remembrance and were considered to be as sacred as grave sites. As such, materials, design principles and symbols suggesting permanence, reverence and commemoration were important elements.

Queenslanders were at the forefront of sustaining public expression. In 1916 they were the first state to establish ANZAC Day as a day of remembrance, encouraging other states to join them in making April 25 a day of national commemoration.

It was expected that this tradition would be continued by future generations and that the memorials themselves would be honoured and respected. However it is apparent from the evidence of vandalism and alterations to memorials throughout the state that this has not always been the case.

The memorials are important, not only in terms of what they represent, but also for what they record. In addition to listing the local men who served and fell in the First World War, many memorials also display details regarding unveiling ceremonies and fund-raising committees, making them invaluable as social and historical documents. They are even more valuable when it is considered that all other documentary records of those who served in the First World War are listed either alphabetically or by military units, making it virtually impossible to determine the original locality of a specific serviceman. The memorials are therefore the only readily accessible records of the origins of the men who served and fell.

Although there are many different types of memorials in Queensland, the digger statue is the most common. It was the most popular choice of communities responsible for erecting the memorials, embodying the ANZAC spirit and representing the qualities of the ideal Australian: loyalty, courage, youth, innocence and masculinity The digger was a phenomenon peculiar to Queensland, perhaps due to the fact that other states had followed Britain's lead and established Advisory Boards made up of architects and artists, prior to the erection of war memorials The digger statue was not highly regarded by artists and architects who were involved in the design of relatively few Queensland memorials.

Most statues were constructed by local masonry firms, although some were by artists or imported. They varied slightly in design, presumably to suit the needs of the communities who commissioned them.

Melrose and Fenwick, the makers of the Sarina memorial, were a monumental masonry firm established in Townsville in c. 1896 They were a large firm with branches throughout Northern Queensland, and provided many war memorials to that area. They enjoyed continued success into the late 20th century, with the business closing in the early 1980s.

== Description ==
The First World War Memorial is situated in a central median strip facing west.

The memorial comprises a pedestal surmounted by a digger statue and is surrounded by two fences. The first fence is located on the pad on which the memorial sits and comprises picked stone bollards, square in plan, and linked by metal rails. Another fence of short circular metal posts linked by a metal chain is located beyond this, forming a protective boundary around the memorial.

The memorial itself sits on a stepped base of five tiers which vary in size, the last two having chamfered tops Surmounting this is the pedestal itself, comprising a plinth capped with cyma recta mouldings and a dado. Both the plinth and the dado have marble plaques attached with lists of the fallen on the dado, and commemorative verses on the plinth. The dado is capped by a substantial cornice of cyma recta mouldings, on top of which stands the digger statue.

The soldier statue stands with his head slightly bowed and hands crossed over a rifle which is in the reversed positioned and resting on his left boot. A tree stump is located behind the statue for support.

== Heritage listing ==
Sarina War Memorial was listed on the Queensland Heritage Register on 5 December 1997 having satisfied the following criteria.

The place is important in demonstrating the evolution or pattern of Queensland's history.

War Memorials are important in demonstrating the pattern of Queensland's history as they are representative of a recurrent theme that involved most communities throughout the state. They provide evidence of an era of widespread Australian patriotism and nationalism, particularly during and following the First World War.

The place is important in demonstrating the principal characteristics of a particular class of cultural places.

The monuments manifest a unique documentary record and are demonstrative of popular taste in the inter-war period.

The memorial at Sarina demonstrates the principal characteristics of a commemorative structure erected as an enduring record of a major historical event. This is achieved through the appropriate use of various symbolic elements including the digger statue, lists of the fallen and commemorative phrases. As a digger statue it is representative of the most popular form of memorial in Queensland.

The place is important because of its aesthetic significance.

The memorial and its setting are a landmark within Sarina and contribute to the aesthetic qualities of the streetscape. The memorial is of aesthetic significance for its high degree of workmanship and design.

The place has a strong or special association with a particular community or cultural group for social, cultural or spiritual reasons.

It has a strong and continuing association with the community as evidence of the impact of a major historic event and as the focal point for the remembrance of that event.

The place has a special association with the life or work of a particular person, group or organisation of importance in Queensland's history.

It also has special association with the Townsville monumental masons, Melrose and Fenwick.
