= McLeod Street Pioneer Cemetery =

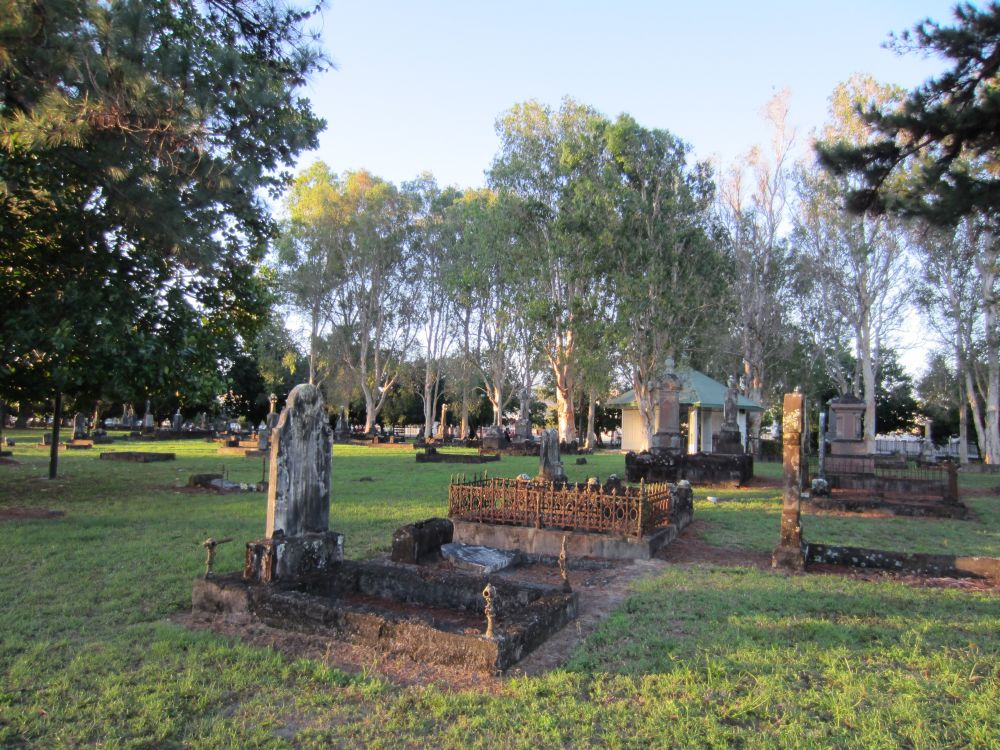
- McLeod Street Pioneer Cemetery, 2015

- Location within Queensland Location within Australia
- 16.9156°S 145.7643°E
- Location: 127–145 McLeod Street, Cairns North, Queensland, Australia

History
- Design period: 1870s–1890s (late 19th century)
- Built: 1877–1954

Queensland Heritage Register
- Official name: McLeod Street Pioneer Cemetery, Cairns General Cemetery
- Type: state heritage (built, landscape)
- Designated: 21 October 1992
- Reference no.: 600383
- Significant period: 1877– (social); 1877–1954 (historical, fabric)
- Significant components: cemetery, trees/plantings, fence/wall – perimeter, memorial/monument, burial/grave, headstone, rotunda

McLeod Street Pioneer Cemetery is a heritage-listed cemetery at 127–145 McLeod Street, Cairns North, Queensland, Australia. It was built from 1877 to 1954. It is also known as Cairns General Cemetery and Cairns Pioneer Cemetery. It was added to the Queensland Heritage Register on 21 October 1992.

== History ==
Cairns was established officially in October 1876, as a port for the newly discovered Hodgkinson goldfields. When the town was surveyed in late 1876, no provision was made for a public cemetery. Earliest burials took place along the Esplanade to the north of the town centre, near the hospital reserve.

On 15 September 1877, almost a year after the establishment of Cairns, a 5-acre site bounded on three sides by McLeod, Gatton and Grove Streets (Section 36, County of Cook, Town of Cairns), was gazetted as a permanent cemetery reserve. The following month, an adjacent five acres (Section 35, bounded on three sides by McLeod, Gatton and Upward Streets) also were gazetted as permanent cemetery reserve.

The 10 acres (4.0 ha) site was chosen because it was thought to be on dry ground, was sufficiently far from the inhabited section of the town, and was accessible from the hospital reserve. Only subsequently was it discovered that the site was poorly drained and subject to seasonal flooding, with graves unable to be dug to a greater depth than 3 feet (0.91 m).

Trustees were appointed in December 1877, but the cemetery reserves in McLeod Street appear to have been unregulated and little used until the mid-1880s. New trustees had been appointed in 1879, but by mid-1883 the cemetery was without supervision or management and no register of burials was being kept. There was no road to the site (McLeod Street was unmade beyond Spence Street in 1884), and the land was not cleared.

New trustees were appointed in September 1883, and in mid-1884 they applied to the Queensland colonial government for financial assistance to establish the Cairns General Cemetery, and to have regulations for the administration of the cemetery approved. A loan of £200 was granted, and regulations for the administration of the cemetery were gazetted on 5 July 1884. In August 1884, the trustees called tenders for fencing the Cairns General Cemetery, and in February 1885, tenders for clearing the site and also fencing the burial ground on the Esplanade. A sexton had been appointed by February 1885, and in the same month the trustees submitted to the colonial secretary their first return of receipts and expenses, year ending 31 December 1884.

Initially, only half of Section 36 and none of Section 35 was fenced as a burial ground. The cemetery appears to have been divided into sections for the use of various Christian denominations, and an area for non-Christians, in which were buried Chinese, Malays, Javanese, and Aborigines. Hebrews may have had a separate section. The Chinese in particular had contributed significantly to the economic and cultural development of Cairns in the late 19th and early 20th centuries, and are believed to have celebrated the feast of the dead three times each year at the cemetery.

By the end of the 19th century the cemetery had become unkempt, and was cause for local comment. Consequently, in 1900 the trustees sought permission to increase the burial fees to defray the expense of ground improvements. A new sexton, William Parsons, was appointed, and by his efforts the principal pathway was metalled and bordered with variegated hedging plants and crotons, flowering shrubs and trees were planted along the fence fronting McLeod Street, the graves were cleared of weed and spear grass, and couch grass imported from the south was laid.

In 1914 a new fence and two gates were erected, but these are no longer extant. Whether this fence enclosed the whole of Section 36 is not clear.

On 22 December 1916 a new cemetery in Martyn Street was opened, following which, burials in the McLeod Street cemetery were restricted to those in family plots. The last burial took place in 1949, and the cemetery was closed officially on 11 May 1954. Registers of burials in the cemetery exist only for the period 1887–1919, and a Register of Deaths for the period 1887–1949, but these indicate that between 1887 and 1949 there were approximately 2500 burials in the McLeod Street cemetery.

The main reason why the unsuitable site remained in use as Cairns' principal cemetery for at least 30 years, was the difficulty experienced in selecting a new location. As early as 1885, the trustees began to investigate alternative sites for a cemetery, and in May 1886, the colonial government, acting on the trustees' application, reserved for cemetery purposes a 40-acre site nearly four miles from town. In the process the McLeod Street cemetery reserves created in September and October 1877 were cancelled. The trustees immediately pointed out that half of Section 36, (allotments 1–5 and 16–20), was fenced and in use as a cemetery, and should be re-gazetted. Due to some confusion by the Lands Department, Section 36 was not re-proclaimed a cemetery reserve (R274) until June 1923. No burials had taken place in Section 35, and in 1908/09 it was divided into reserves for a morgue, endemic diseases hospital, and municipal purposes. It is now a reserve for electricity purposes.

The 1886 cemetery reserve proved too difficult to access, and was cancelled in 1890 when a new cemetery of 40 acres (16 ha) was reserved from the former police paddock near Stratford. Although increased to over 45 acres (18 ha) in 1891, and located adjacent to the Cairns–Herberton railway, it was never used as a cemetery. In 1928 part of the reserve was resumed and subdivided into residential allotments for workers' housing, and the remaining reserve was cancelled in 1940. In the meantime, the cemetery reserve in Martyn Street had been proclaimed and opened for use in late 1916.

The number of burials at the McLeod Street cemetery increased substantially after the turn of the century, and in August 1905 the Cairns Town Council, under the provisions of the Local Government Act 1902, assumed trusteeship of the Cairns General Cemetery. Technically, this trusteeship referred to the 1890 cemetery reserve near Stratford, but the Cairns Town Council interpreted it as giving them control of the McLeod Street cemetery. This control was not made official until 1923.

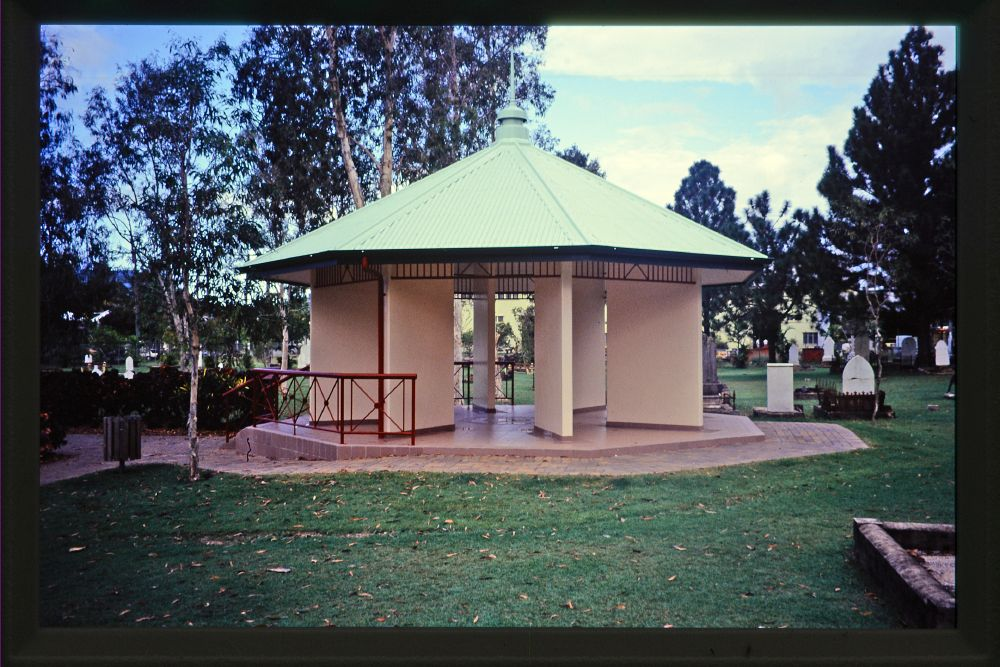
Information centre in the cemetery, 1992

The Cairns City Council failed in 1965, 1968/69, 1973/74 and 1986, to gain permission from the Lands Department to convert the McLeod Street cemetery into a park. Finally, in 1988, the Council commissioned a conservation plan for the old cemetery. This was adopted and the Council, together with local organisations and volunteers, restored the remaining graves (approximately 290), identified over 200 previously "lost" grave sites, removed self-sown mature trees which were causing damage to graves, rebuilt the fence facing the railway line, lit the principal pathway, and built a small information centre within the grounds. The site was renamed the McLeod Street Pioneer Cemetery, and is promoted in Cairns as a tourist attraction.

Burials at the McLeod Street cemetery included the first mayor of Cairns, Richard Ash Kingsford; Cairns' much admired medical pioneer, Dr Edward Albert Koch; men who died during construction of the Cairns to Herberton Railway; and a beche-de-mere fisherman who had been associated with Trinity Bay prior to the establishment of Cairns. The surviving headstones record people from all levels of early Cairns society – professional, business, clerical, political, mercantile – and the cosmopolitan nature of early Cairns is reflected in the range of nationalities, including English, Irish, Scottish, Japanese, Javanese, Chinese, Indian, Italian, Bulgarian and Swedish, buried in the McLeod Street cemetery.

The Cairns Regional Council has adopted a conservation plan for the cemetery.

== Description ==
The Pioneer Cemetery, located on a level site on the southern corner of McLeod and Grove Streets, is bounded by the Cairns railway to the southwest and industrial buildings to the southeast.

The cemetery is well maintained, with many of the trees which had caused structural damage to graves having been removed, and an extensive landscape program undertaken. A rotunda has been recently constructed in the centre of the cemetery to display interpretive material. Paths bounded by colourful native plants, leading northeast to McLeod Street and west to Grove Street, have been laid to replicate those existing in 1901. There is a large group of pine trees to the northwest, which will eventually be removed as the acid from the pine needles damages marble.

The cemetery contains denominational divisions, the boundaries of which are not clear, including Protestant, Roman Catholic, mixed denominations and non-Christian.

Although the cemetery contains over 2500 graves, many of these are yet to be located. Sub-surface graves, identified with the use of a metal detector locating grave number markers, have each been marked with a small concrete plinth. The plinths incorporate brass plaques inscribed with the name of the deceased, year and place of birth, year of death, last place of residence and occupation, if known. Of these, approximately 200 have been positively identified and a further 100 have been located but lack enough information for positive identification. As possibly only 600–700 graves can be accurately located, the names of all those interred are intended to be placed in the recent rotunda structure.

Many of the graves have concrete surrounds with marble headstones. Some graves retain iron railing surrounds, some of which have collapsed or are partially missing. There are a few large monumental graves, featuring carved granite and marble head-pieces.

A timber paling fence has been constructed along the southwest boundary, with pine log barriers along both street frontages.

== Notable interments ==
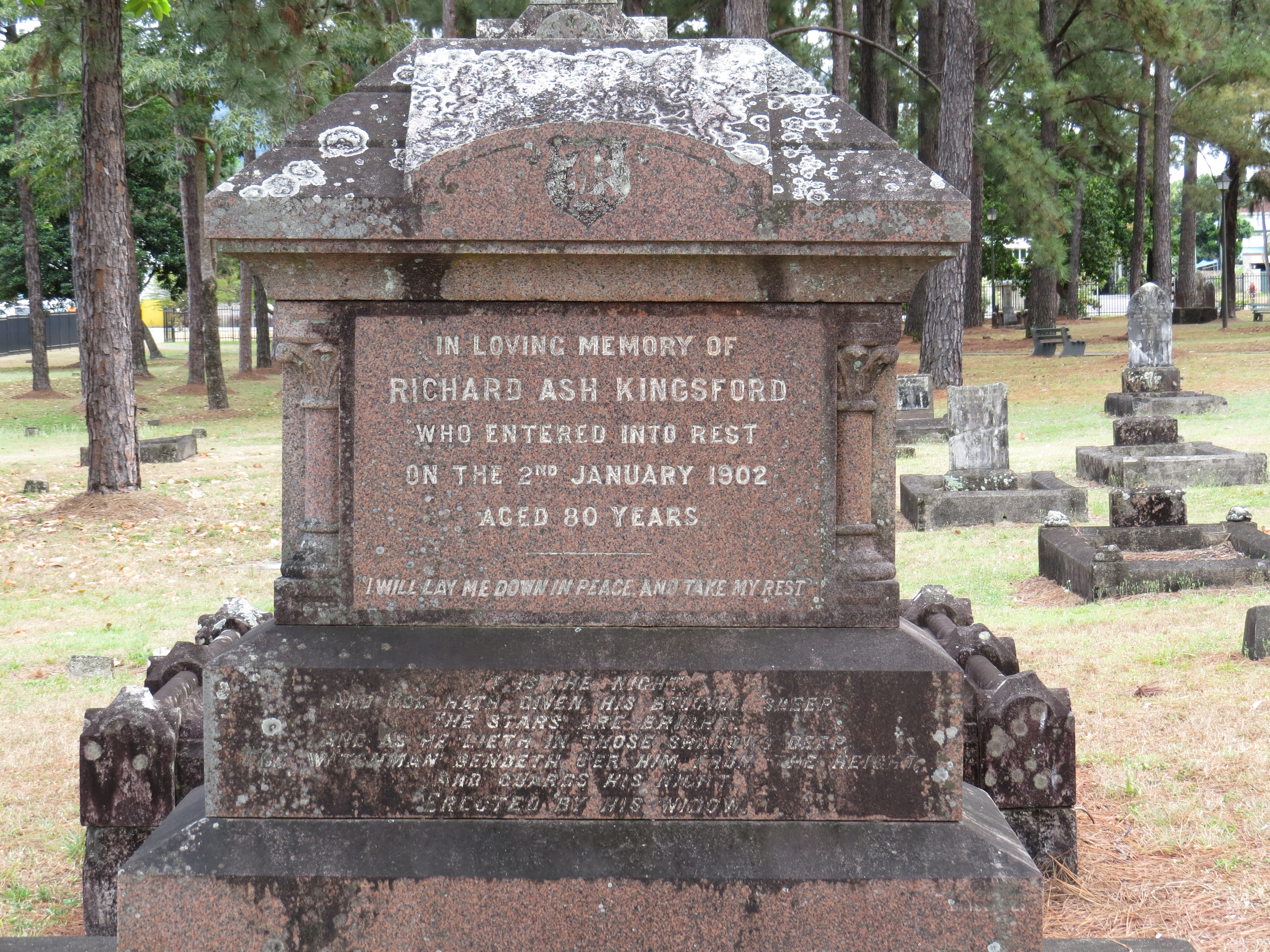
Headstone of Richard Ash Kingsford

- Richard Ash Kingsford, mayor of Brisbane and Cairns and Member of the Queensland Legislative Assembly

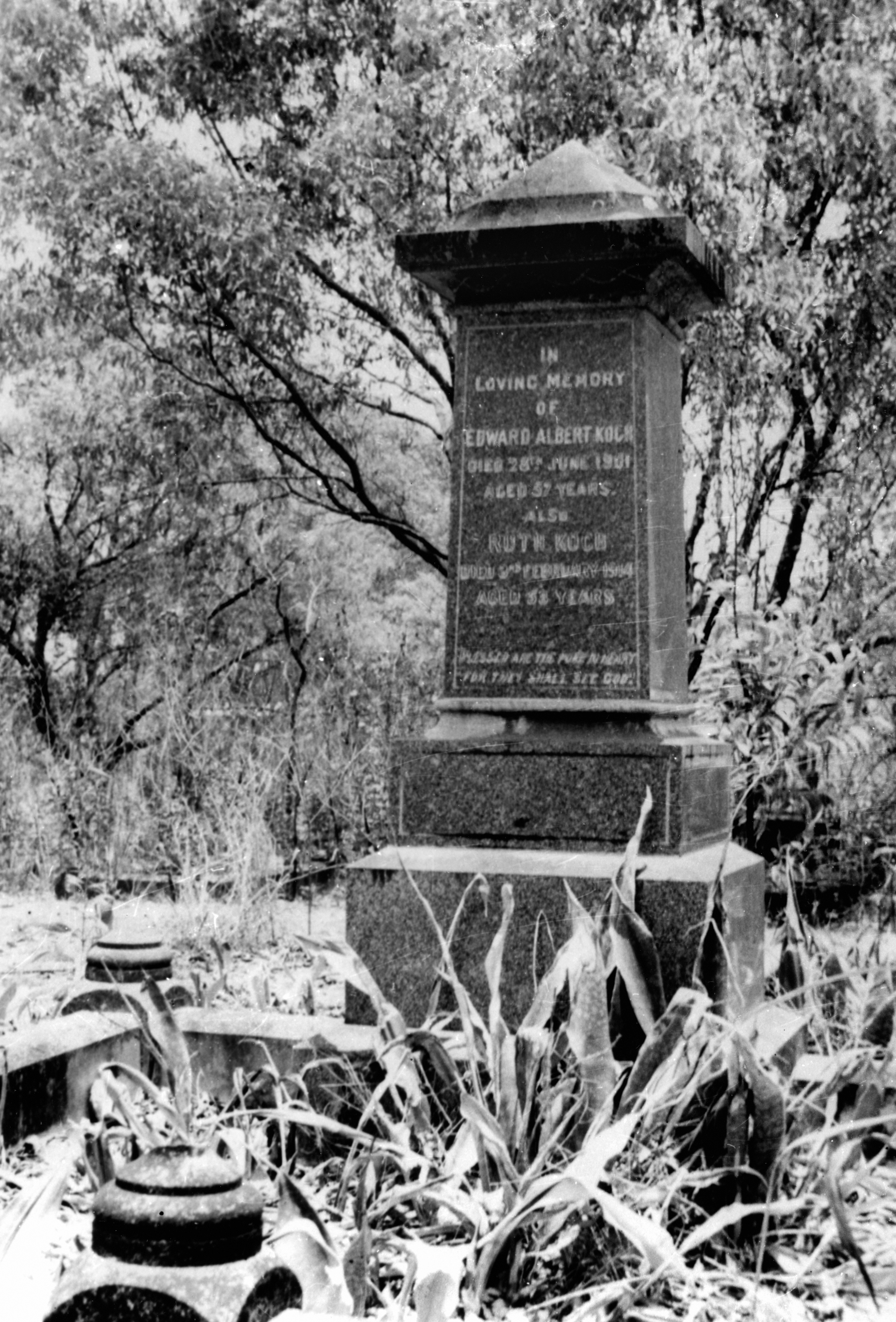
Grave of Dr Edward Albert Koch

- Edward Albert Koch, doctor in Cairns

== Heritage listing ==
McLeod Street Pioneer Cemetery was listed on the Queensland Heritage Register on 21 October 1992 having satisfied the following criteria.

The place is important in demonstrating the evolution or pattern of Queensland's history.

The McLeod Street Pioneer Cemetery survives as a unique historical record of the multi-cultural social, economic and political life of early Cairns, and is an unusual illustration of the major events which shaped the development of Cairns and Far North Queensland in the late 19th and early 20th centuries.

The place is important in demonstrating the principal characteristics of a particular class of cultural places.

In the formal arrangement of grave sites, denominational divisions and types of memorials, the cemetery reflects late 19th and early 20th century public taste and social perceptions about burial and memorial.

The place is important because of its aesthetic significance.

The place has aesthetic value, which contributes to the Cairns townscape.

== See also ==
- List of cemeteries in Australia
