= Finch Hatton War Memorial =

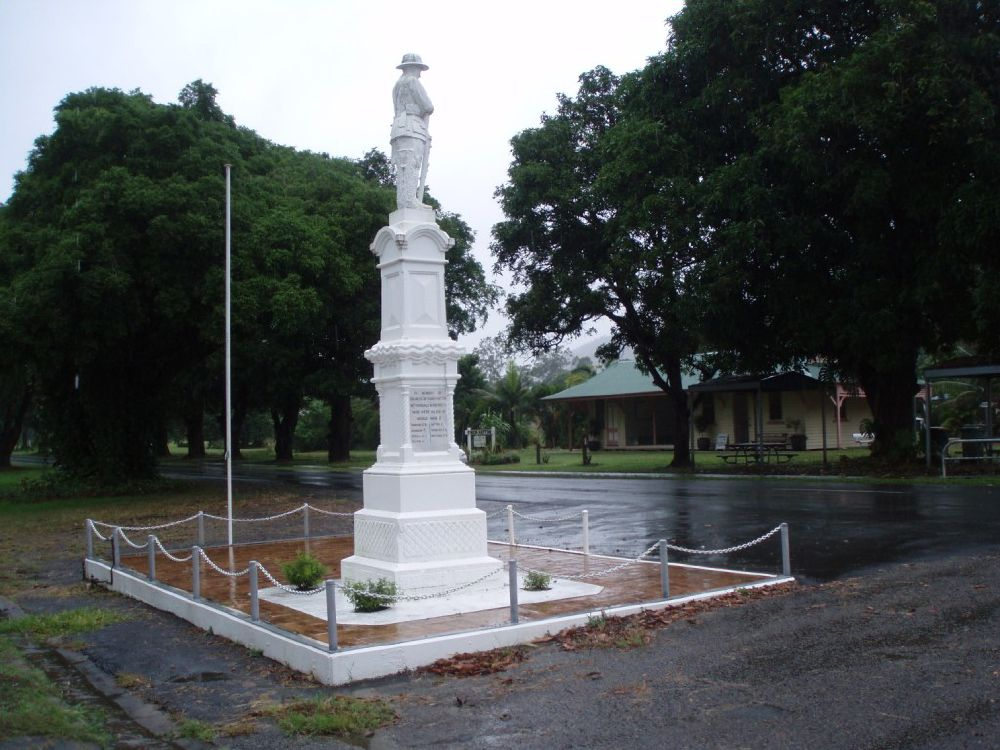
- Finch Hatton War Memorial, 2009

- Location within Queensland
- 21.1392°S 148.6334°E
- Location: Anzac Parade, Finch Hatton, Mackay Region, Queensland, Australia

History
- Design period: 1919–1930s (interwar period)
- Built: 1921

Site notes
- Architect: Melrose & Fenwick
- Architectural style: Eclectic

Queensland Heritage Register
- Official name: Finch Hatton War Memorial
- Type: state heritage (built)
- Designated: 21 October 1992
- Reference no.: 600723
- Significant period: 1921– (social); 1921 (historical, fabric)
- Significant components: memorial – soldier statue
- Builders: Melrose & Fenwick

Finch Hatton War Memorial is a heritage-listed memorial at Anzac Parade, Finch Hatton, Mackay Region, Queensland, Australia. It was designed by Melrose & Fenwick and built in 1921 by Melrose & Fenwick. It was added to the Queensland Heritage Register on 21 October 1992.

== History ==
The Finch Hatton War Memorial was erected on 19 November 1921, and it is possible that it may never have been officially unveiled. It was erected at a cost of £200 which was paid for by public subscription. The stone memorial was designed and produced by Melrose and Fenwick of Mackay and honours the 16 local men who fell in the First World War. Later additions honour the 7 who fell in the Second World War.

The erection of the memorial was made possible through the combined efforts of two towns, Finch Hatton and Netherdale.

The initial development of Finch Hatton was in the mid 1900s as the terminus of the Pioneer Valley railway line. The town further developed when the Cattle Creek sugar mill opened in 1906. A supporting infrastructure of schools, theatres and halls was established, as well as residences for both workers and management. The town became the main centre of the Pioneer Valley hinterland and by the 1920s was the third largest township (after Mackay and Sarina) in the region.

Australia, and Queensland in particular, had few civic monuments before the First World War. The memorials erected in its wake became our first national monuments, recording the devastating impact of the war on a young nation. Australia lost 60 000 from a population of about 4 million, representing one in five of those who served. No previous or subsequent war has made such an impact on the nation.

Even before the end of the war, memorials became a spontaneous and highly visible expression of national grief. To those who erected them, they were as sacred as grave sites, substitute graves for the Australians whose bodies lay in battlefield cemeteries in Europe and the Middle East. British policy decreed that the Empire war dead were to be buried where they fell. The word "cenotaph", commonly applied to war memorials at the time, literally means "empty tomb".

Australian war memorials are distinctive in that they commemorate not only the dead. Australians were proud that their first great national army, unlike other belligerent armies, was composed entirely of volunteers, men worthy of honour whether or not they paid the supreme sacrifice. Many memorials honour all who served from a locality, not just the dead, providing valuable evidence of community involvement in the war. Such evidence is not readily obtainable from military records, or from state or national listings, where names are categorised alphabetically or by military unit.

Australian war memorials are also valuable evidence of imperial and national loyalties, at the time, not seen as conflicting; the skills of local stonemasons, metalworkers and architects; and of popular taste. In Queensland, the soldier statue was the popular choice of memorial, whereas the obelisk predominated in the southern states, possibly a reflection of Queensland's larger working-class population and a lesser involvement of architects.

Many of the First World War monuments have been updated to record local involvement in later conflicts, and some have fallen victim to unsympathetic re-location and repair. Although there are many different types of memorials in Queensland, the digger statue is the most common. It was the most popular choice of communities responsible for erecting the memorials, embodying the Anzac spirit and representing the qualities of the ideal Australian: loyalty, courage, youth, innocence and masculinity. The digger was a phenomenon peculiar to Queensland, perhaps due to the fact that other states had followed Britain's lead and established Advisory Boards made up of architects and artists, prior to the erection of war memorials. The digger statue was not highly regarded by artists and architects who were involved in the design of relatively few Queensland memorials.

Most statues were constructed by local masonry firms, although some were by artists or imported.

Melrose and Fenwick the makers of the Finch Hatton memorial, were a monumental masonry firm established in Townsville in c. 1896. They were a large firm with branches throughout Northern Queensland. They enjoyed continued success into the late 20th century, only going out of business in the early 1980s.

The pedestal of this monument is of an unusually ornate style. The impetus for the design is not known; however it is probably a result of regional tastes and preferences.

== Description ==
The First World War Memorial is situated in Finch Hatton facing the Mackay-Eungella Road.

The memorial rises to a height of 17 feet (5.2 m) and comprises a pedestal surmounted by a digger statue.

The sandstone memorial sits on a base step with picked stone faces, margined and chiselled. Surmounting this are two larger steps with chamfered corners. The lower of these two steps has a diaper pattern, margined and chiselled on all faces. The upper step is smooth faced and is capped with cyma recta mouldings.

The pedestal rises from this base and is in two parts. The lower part consists of a recessed square section with small barley twist columns at each corner. The square section continues above a shallow cornice and is capped by a series of curvilinear inverted steps. Surmounting this is a second section, smooth-faced with recessed panels on each face and stop-chamfers to each corner. This is capped by a further series of inverted steps which are arched over recessed panels.

Standing on a small block above this is the digger statue. The soldier statue stands with his head bowed and hands crossed over a rifle which is in the reversed position. A tree stump is located behind the statue for support.

== Heritage listing ==
Finch Hatton War Memorial was listed on the Queensland Heritage Register on 21 October 1992 having satisfied the following criteria.

The place is important in demonstrating the evolution or pattern of Queensland's history.

War Memorials are important in demonstrating the pattern of Queensland's history as they are representative of a recurrent theme that involved most communities throughout the state. They provide evidence of an era of widespread Australian patriotism and nationalism, particularly during and following the First World War.

The place is important in demonstrating the principal characteristics of a particular class of cultural places.

The monuments manifest a unique documentary record and are demonstrative of popular taste in the inter-war period.

Erected in 1921, the memorial at Finch Hatton demonstrates the principal characteristics of a commemorative structure erected as an enduring record of a major historical event. This is achieved through the use of appropriate materials and design elements. As a digger statue it is representative of the most popular form of memorial in Queensland.

The place is important because of its aesthetic significance.

This particular memorial is of aesthetic significance for its high level of workmanship and design. The pedestal displays a pattern and design which is uncommon in war memorials in Queensland.

The place has a strong or special association with a particular community or cultural group for social, cultural or spiritual reasons.

As a combined effort of two towns, it has a strong association with the communities of both as evidence of the impact of a major historic event.

The place has a special association with the life or work of a particular person, group or organisation of importance in Queensland's history.

It also has special associations with monumental masons Melrose and Fenwick as an example of their work.
