= Melrose & Fenwick =

Monumental masonry firm in Queensland, Australia

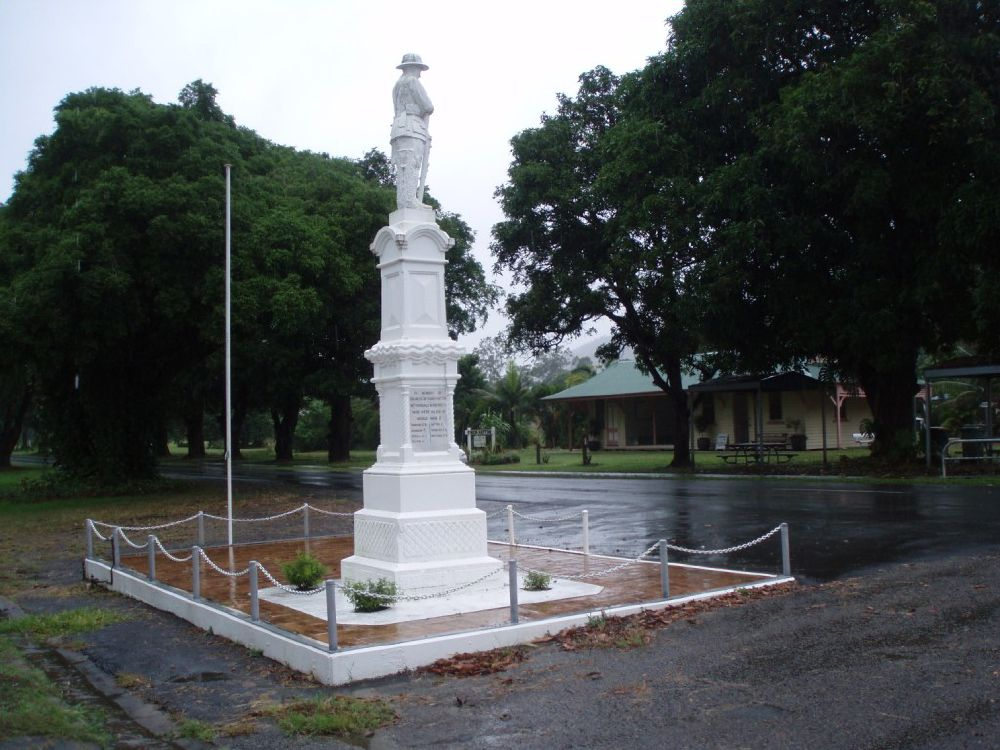
Finch Hatton War Memorial, executed by Melrose & Fenwick

Melrose & Fenwick were a monumental masonry firm in Townsville, Queensland, Australia. They are known for the many Queensland war memorials that they produced.

== History ==
The firm was established c. 1896. They were a large firm with branches throughout Northern Queensland. They enjoyed continued success into the late 20th century, only going out of business in the early 1980s.

== Significant works ==
- 1919: Sarina War Memorial
- 1921: Finch Hatton War Memorial
- 1929: World War I Cenotaph, Mackay
