= Forrest River massacre: Investigations and Royal Commission =

Royal commission in Western Australia

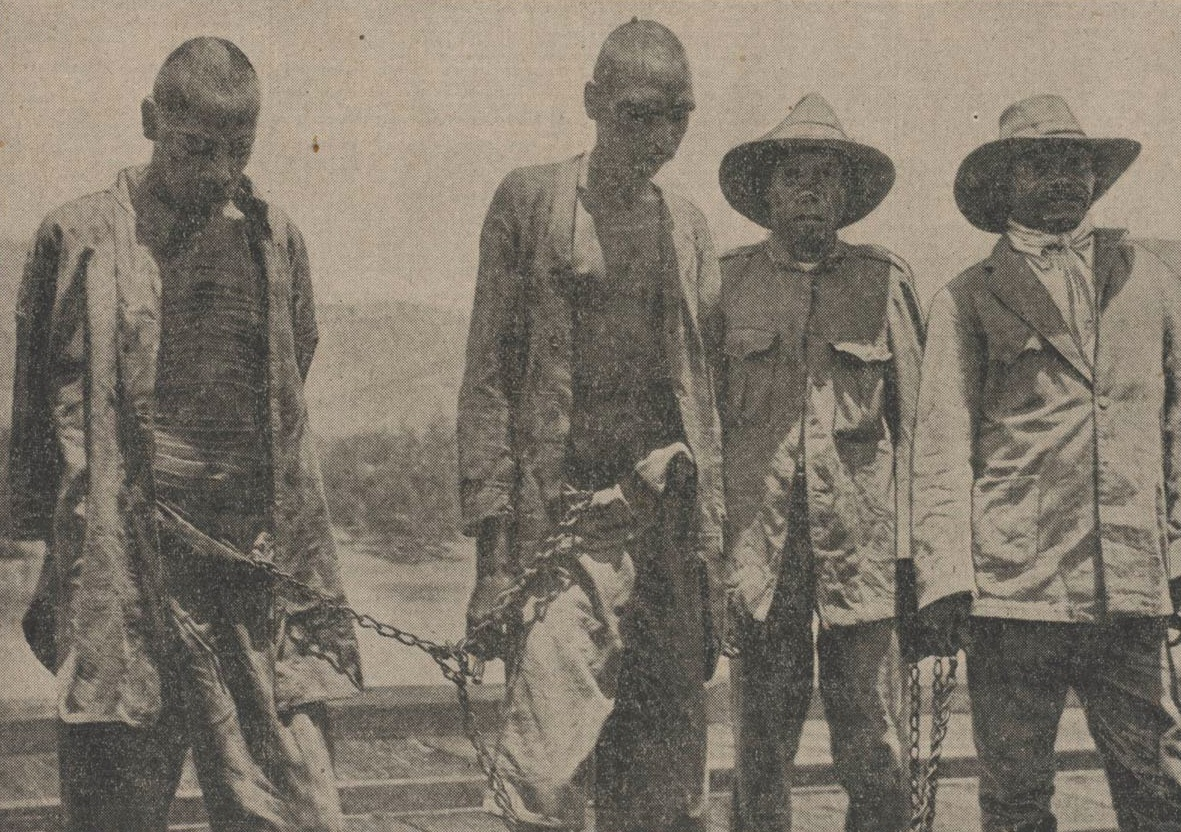
Lumbia (on left) following his arrest for the murder of Fred Hay in 1926. On the right, two Aboriginal trackers.

The Forrest River massacre, or Oombulgurri massacre, was a massacre of Indigenous Australian people by a law enforcement party in the wake of the killing of pastoralist Fred Hay, which took place in the Kimberley region of Western Australia in 1926. The massacre was investigated by the Woods Royal Commission in 1927 which subsequently determined that 11 people had been killed. Charges were brought against two officers but dismissed for lack of evidence. The Commissions findings have been disputed by journalist Rod Moran, whose analysis has received some academic support while most academic historians accept that a massacre did take place but disagree over the number of victims.

== Background ==
In 1921 two returned servicemen, Leonard Overheu and Frederick Hay, applied for a grant under the War Service Land Settlement Scheme. Nulla Nulla station was excised from the Marndoc Aboriginal reserve with the traditional owners, the King River Aborigines, removed and forced to live on the outskirts of Wyndham. By late 1925 the Kimberleys had suffered two years of severe drought. Heavy rains in early 1926 filled the waterholes, which resulted in large groups of Aborigines entering the Marndoc reserve, killing cattle for food. Hay and Overheu had been complaining about the spearing of their cattle, claiming it was "part of a conspiracy" against Nulla Nulla by the Rev. Ernest Gribble of the nearby Forrest River Mission (later renamed Oombulgurri). (Note: Overheu claimed the value of the speared cattle to be £10,000 ($680,000 in 2009 dollars) despite having only a small herd and needing to work and live in Wyndham to supplement the stations cotton crop.) In response, Sergeant Buckland from Wyndham had the station declared a prohibited area under the 1905 Aborigines Act preventing Aborigines from entering or crossing it to reach other areas. On 18 May, Overheu made a formal complaint that a large mob of Aborigines were spearing cattle on the station and along with Aboriginal employee Tommy Doort, his wife Lyddie and two stock boys camped on the lower Pentecost River to await the arrival of police.

Constable James St Jack along with Aboriginal trackers Jacob and Windie Joe arrived on 20 May and the group moved to Durragee Hill where they dispersed a mob of 250-300 Aborigines. After the dispersal of the Aborigines, the patrol continued to the Nulla Nulla Homestead arriving after dark to find Hay missing and a search the following morning found Hay's body. Rev Gribble entered a note into the mission log dated 27 May, reporting the "news" that Tommy and Windie Joe had killed Blui-Nua at Durragee Hill and that an old man named Umbillie had been killed by blows to the head by unknown persons.

=== Death of Hay ===
On 23 May 1926, while riding the boundary of Nulla Nulla station, Fred Hay attacked an Aboriginal man by the name of Lumbia. Hay flogged Lumbia 20-30 times with his stockwhip and as he rode off was stabbed in the back with a spear and killed by Lumbia. The reasons for the assaults remain unclear. Several native accounts exist as reported by interpreters. All the various accounts given before Lumbia's trial share a common thread, the rape of one or both of Lumbia's child wives. On hearing of Hay's death Rev Gribble rushed to Wyndham where he swore in Richard Jolly and Bernard O'Leary as special constables under the supervision of Constable Denis Regan and tasked them with finding Hay's killer.

== Massacre Rumours ==
Regan's patrol left Wyndham on 1 June, to hunt for Hay's unknown killer, meeting up with St Jack's patrol at Jowa. The police patrol now consisted of four whites, one of them Fred Hay's partner Leopold Overheu, two settlers specially sworn in by Gribble as policemen, seven Aboriginal trackers, 42 pack horses/mules and led by Constables James St Jack and Denis Regan. On 4 July, the patrol returned to the Forrest River mission with some 30 Aboriginal men in chains, among them Lumbia, who, when questioned through an interpreter, confessed to having killed Hay. Over the following weeks several Aboriginal women attended the mission to have bullet wounds treated and it was claimed that the sister of another woman had been shot dead by the patrol and her baby bashed to death. In the months that followed, rumours circulated of a massacre by the police party. Attempts by the sergeant of police at Wyndham to investigate the rumours were met by refusals by those implicated to cooperate or answer claims they were involved. Rev. Gribble alleged that 30 men and women were missing who he suspected had been killed by the police party. Local Aborigines claimed up to 100 men women and children had been killed. Two years later Professor A. P. Elkin visited the area and estimated 20 had been killed.

Leopold Overheu's house boy Tommy, who accompanied him on the police patrol, was the first to talk about the massacres after speaking to some bush Aborigines who passed on the story to Rev Gribble. On 16 July, Gribble sent two Aborigines to secretly meet with Tommy to find out more details. Overheu found out and according to Tommy's wife Lyddie, rushed in with a drawn pistol and Tommy fled to hide in the bush. On 23 September, Overheu had Tommy's wife Lyddie brought to the Six Mile camp and Tommy came out of hiding to join her. Overheu gave him new clothes and asked Tommy to meet him the following morning to help find some horses that had strayed. Overheu and Tommy left together with Overheu returning a few hours later alone, leading Tommy's horse. Tommy was never seen again. Overheu later testified he had no knowledge of the rumours about the police killings or that Tommy had spoken to anyone about his involvement in the killings until after he had disappeared. However Inspector Douglas had interviewed Overheu extensively on this very subject in early September.

== Investigations ==
On 12 August Rev. Gribble, accompanied by Inspector E. C. Mitchell of the Western Australian Aborigines Department in Wyndham, visited two of the alleged massacre sites identified by Tommy Doort, Mowerie and Gotegotemerrie. Mitchell reported that he found considerable evidence of attempts to clean up the site, which included the chipping away of stone to remove dark stains from a rock ledge, and that he had recovered a quantity of intact human teeth and skull fragments from the ashes of a large fire nearby. Mitchell sent a telegram to the Chief Protector, A.O. Neville: "Shocking revelations, saw place Forrest River, rocky higher bed where natives chained small tree killed there then bodies burnt improvised oven". Two weeks later Chief Inspector Douglas visited both sites and noted finding dark stains that had human hairs attached on a rock slab behind a tree near where the fire had been. In September Douglas returned with Sulieman, a tracker who had ridden with the patrol. Following tracks from Mowerie and Gotegotemerrie to police camp 3 Sulieman pointed out the remains of a fire. He claimed that the Aboriginal trackers had been sent to destroy another police camp while St Jack and O'Leary remained with six chained prisoners, and that, on returning the next morning, they found Constable St Jack and O'Leary at a large fire. He did not see any of the prisoners killed, but "knew that the bodies were in the fire". Arriving at camp 3 Sulieman stated that Regan, O'Leary and Murnane led nine prisoners in chains into a ravine, returning the next morning alone. Douglas followed tracks from camp 3 into the ravine where he "found the remains of a large fire and some thousands of fragments of bone in the ashes". (Note: At most of the sites much of the ash had been scooped from the fires and thrown into nearby billabongs where charcoal and bone fragments were still visible on the bottom until rains in 1927 washed them away.) Douglas' report to the police commissioner stated: "sixteen natives were burned in three lots; one, six and nine; only fragments (of) bone not larger than one inch remain".

== Wood Royal Commission ==
On the recommendation of the police commissioner a Royal Commission, conducted by G. T. Wood, sent an evidence-gathering party and heard evidence regarding Gribble's allegations.

The 1927 Wood Royal Commission was tasked with investigating the disappearance of Tommy, one of the patrols trackers and a key witness, who had vanished after meeting with Leopold Overheu and the investigation of three particular sites (Gotegotemerrie, Mowerie and Dala) in the vicinity of the Forrest River Mission (now Oombulgurii) where it was alleged the massacres had taken place. It did not include Camp 3 where Police Inspector Douglas had discovered thousands of fragments of bone that he believed to be human, nor any other locations where police camped. Leopold Overheu hired Walter Nairn to represent the parties under investigation and requested members of the police patrol donate to the defence in proportion to their involvement. The Crown declined to provide any legal representation for the Aborigines Department and Gribble was obliged to act in the capacity of a bush lawyer and handle the entire case on their behalf.

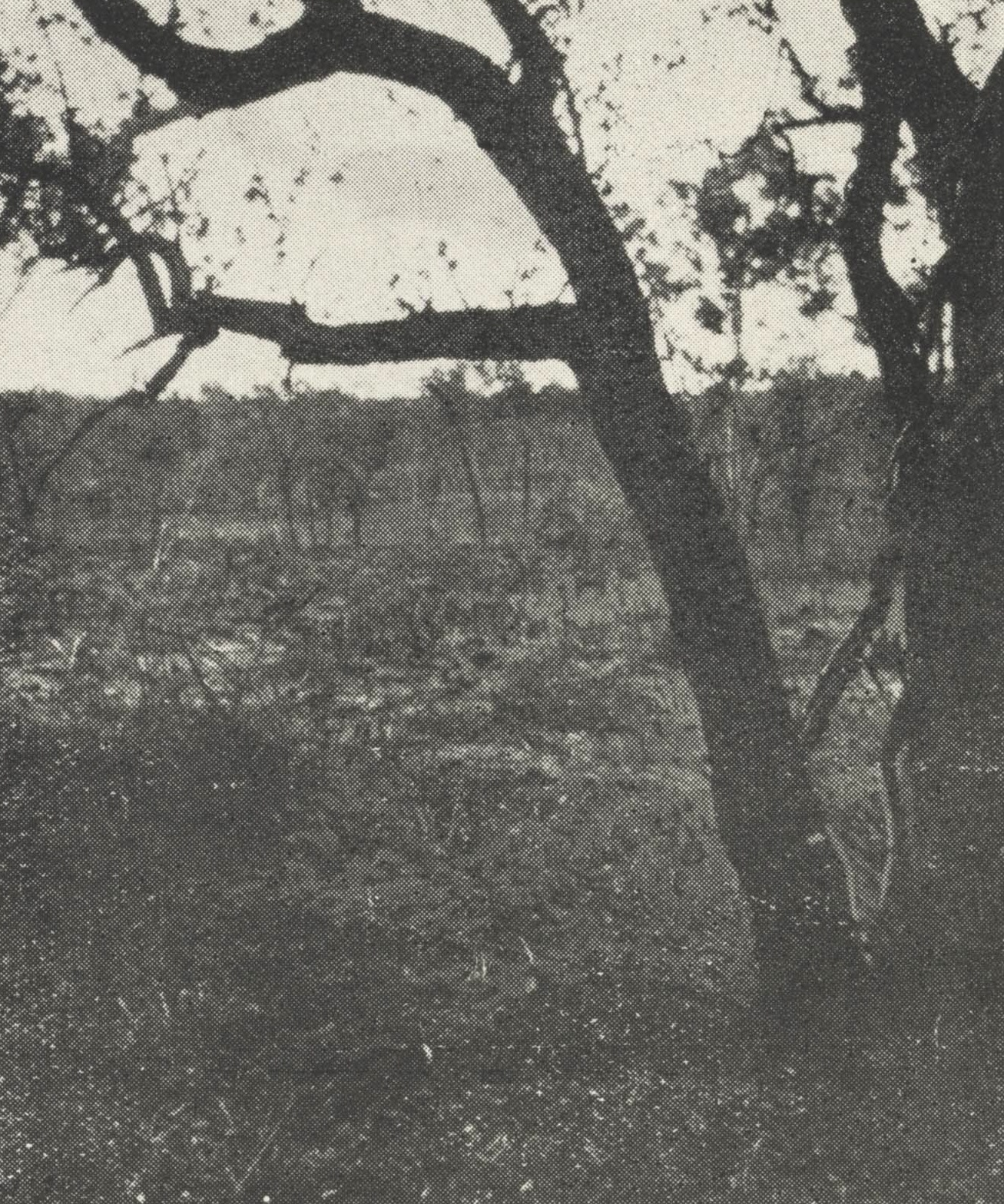
The bullet scarred tree at Dala. Exhibit C, Wood Royal Commission

Sergeant Buckland had given evidence on 3 March that he had investigated Dala and his evidence was so disparaging to Gribble's claims for the site that Commissioner Wood visited Dala on the 14th to see for himself. From what he found, Wood had no hesitation in declaring Buckland unreliable and less than candid with the commission and confirmed Gribble's account. The rainy season was late and the ash and footprints were still present and clearly visible (the first rain of the season fell the day after the Commission left). Sergeant Buckland had claimed that when he visited the site he found no evidence of a police camp, Wood found the site strewn with empty food cans and tobacco tins which he regarded as evidence of a police camp. A partially burnt tree surrounded by ash was peppered with what Gribble claimed were bullet scars but which Buckland had testified were marks made by stones or other blunt objects. Recalled by Wood, Buckland admitted that one of the marks had been a bullet scar and that Quartpot, a police tracker, had later dug a bullet from it which Wood asked to be produced. Constable Donegan, who had taken possession of the bullet, had said that he was not certain if he could find it, however it was found and given to Wood. Later, Inspector Douglas said that the bullet looked like a .44, the same caliber as the police issue Winchester although lighter in weight, but stated that it would be impossible for a bullet to pass through a human body and lodge in a tree behind it. Green noted that the Winchester rifle was a popular model carried by travelers in the area and that bullets extracted from trees in the Kimberley did not necessarily come from police rifles. At the subsequent trial of Regan and St Jack, Buckland repeated his testimony that there was no police camp at Dala, the tree scars had been made by a stone and the recovery of the bullet was never brought up.

The resident magistrate and medical officer at Wyndham, Dr A. R. Adams, was reported by Inspector Mitchell as having said that the charred bones he was given to examine, mostly parts of ribs and long bones, were "probably human remains". Wood requested these bones but Adams refused to hand them over on the grounds that the Chief Medical Officer of the WA Health Department in Perth, McGillivray, was not qualified to make an analysis. Shown the material collected by Douglas, McGillivray, testified that apart from some human teeth the bones were either not human or not definitely human. At the Royal Commission, allegations of murder and the burning of bodies were made principally by the Rev. Ernest Gribble. Under questioning by the Commissioner and by the lawyer representing those accused, Gribble did not identify any Aborigine as having been a witness or as having made a report of the alleged crimes. Although he recorded several such reports as having been made to him, he denied having any record or knowledge of who made the reports.

Patrol trackers Sulieman, Windy Joe and Frank had agreed to testify against the police and were being kept in Wyndham to present their evidence however, they were unable to give evidence after they disappeared. Inspector Douglas testified that someone had told them that they would be hanged and so they had escaped overnight and went into hiding. Constable St Jack, who the trackers were to testify against, was tasked with finding and returning them to testify. Sulieman was found at Keep River 350 km (220 mi) from Wyndham but was not returned before the Commission concluded. Sulieman claimed that on the day Commissioner Wood arrived the trackers had been shown a picture of a black hanging from a tree and told that they would be hanged if they testified.

Although the first official report of the police murders had been Gribble's telegram to Chief Protector of Aborigines Neville (via Buckland) on 30 July. In testimony, Inspector Mitchell admitted he had been informed of the murders on 21 July. When asked why he had not passed on these reports to police he stated it had been pushed from his mind by allegations of the Forrest River massacres. Likewise Sergeant Buckland testified that he had first heard of the massacres on 19 June. When asked who told him he replied that it was common knowledge around Wyndham but when pressed stated that Gribble had told him however, there is no evidence Gribble saw Buckland before 30 July, coincidentally, 19 June was the day Murnane returned and spoke to Buckland which resulted in Buckland ordering the patrol to return to Wyndham, an action that was never explained.

A claim that Hay had raped Lumbia's wife was raised before the Commission by Reverend Gribble but this claim was never made on behalf of Lumbia or his wives at his trial. Hays had previously used the services of Lumbia's child-wife with his reluctant permission but she had rejected Hay on the day of the murder.

Questioned by Commissioner Wood, Constable Regan accepted Wood's assertion that burnt remains of Aborigines had been found near Gotegotemerrie but denied the tracks leading from the police camp to Gotegotemerrie had been made by his patrol.

Commissioner: these atrocities were committed by a mounted party operating about that time you were there, you suggest they were committed by some party unknown to you?

Regan: Yes
Commissioner: Is it probable that such a party could have operated at the same time without your knowing it?

Regan: It would be very unlikely, but still not impossible.

During the inquiry Wood presented copies of a series of coded telegrams written by Overheu. Nairn objected to Wood making private telegrams public but Wood overruled him as they "show that one member of the police party interested himself considerably in getting the defence worked up". The telegrams revealed a network of communication between the "interested parties", local fund raising for the defence that had raised more than £1,000 ($68,000 in 2009 dollars) and detailed the "conspiracy" of Gribble organising the killing of Nulla Nulla cattle by mission Aboriginals, giving details of how it was done that Wood found barely credible. More to the point, the telegrams revealed Overheu's hatred of Aborigines, a view supported by a statement to Detective Sergeant Manning by Lyddie, that it was Overhue who continually urged the police to kill the prisoners.

With the disappearance of Tommy it was considered important to get Murnane to testify. His whereabouts could not be discovered and Wood assigned Inspector Condon and Detective Manning to find him. In March 1927 a tip was received and Murnane was subpoenaed to appear. Wood instructed Nairn that he could not speak to Murnane before he testified, an instruction Nairn ignored when he intercepted him on the way to the court and briefed him while Wood waited. When Murnane testified, he confirmed the main points of the evidence of the white participants but differed on two points. Jolly had said that Murnane had taken part in a raid on a large encampment, Murnane said that he had not been on that raid and that Jolly was mistaken. The other point of difference was cited by Wood; Regan's patrol (and Murnane) had originally stated they first joined St Jack's patrol north of Nulla Nulla while St Jack and Overheu said they met at the homestead (where they met had an important bearing on the alleged killings by St Jack and Overheu before Regan's party joined them). Testifying before the commission, with the exception of Murnane who repeated his earlier statement, all the white members of the patrol now repeated St Jacks version. An angry Wood concluded this was due to Nairn only having 15 minutes to speak to Murnane before he testified and added him to the list of witnesses he believed were prepared to lie to the commission.

Commissioner Wood submitted his report on 21 May 1927, concluding that the police patrol killed 11 Aborigines at the three sites and that on the evidence of inspector Douglas it is most probable that nine more natives shared a similar fate and reporting that there was a conspiracy of silence in the Kimberley. Although Wood suspected that Tommy had been murdered by Leopold Overheu he found no proof to support the allegation and concluded that all the white members of the patrol had lied and orchestrated their testimony and that their journal was fabricated. Wood warned that his conclusions were based on the balance of probabilities not the beyond reasonable doubt standard required for a trial. On the question of the number of Aboriginals killed Commissioner Wood stated that "If I cannot get direct evidence I shall have to depend on hearsay."

=== Later criticism of Commission evidence ===
Many witnesses retracted statements, refused to testify or simply disappeared and several key Aboriginal witnesses to the killings "escaped" from custody at Wyndham before they could give evidence to the Commission. None of the Aborigines named to the Commission who had witnessed the massacres or who had relatives killed were called to testify. As a result, Gribble was the only witness for the massacres.

The Chief Medical Officer of the WA Health Department, McGillivray, had testified as an expert witness on the recovered bone fragments. He identified himself as a bacteriologist with no experience as a forensic expert with his duties for the health department generally consisting of testing swabs for disease and infections (Question 460, sworn evidence of McGillivray). When shown an obvious hip joint he stated that it was "too small to be of a human adult" and when shown what everyone, including Wood, said they recognised as part of a human jawbone (Maxilla) complete with tooth sockets, McGillivray stated that he did not "think it was human". Initially rejecting the teeth as human, under cross examination he admitted they did not resemble animal teeth so had to be human.

Historian Neville Green obtained copies of the letters cited as "evidence" to discredit Gribble and found nothing in them to support what was claimed in regards to their content.

Hepburn Tindale, the cousin of Norman Tindale, testified as an authority on northern Aborigines and claimed to have a master's degree from Oxford University, a Diploma of Anthropology, a Fellowship from the Royal Geographical Society and was an author of articles for the Manchester Guardian (Questions 2758 and 2783, sworn evidence Tindale). Although Oxford University archives revealed that he did in fact enrol in 1923 he left the same year and never graduated. He had no fellowship from the Royal Geographical Society and no newspaper articles in his name could be found.

Dr Donald Mackenzie's expert evidence on the impossibility of cremating the bodies to the state of the bone fragments found, cited a 1906 Wisconsin murder trial where a Dr Golden conducted a "classical" cremation experiment (Questions 2465 to 2474, sworn evidence Mackenzie). Neville Green claimed that an investigation found that no such experiment was ever conducted and that in fact Dr Golden did not exist. Rod Moran has subsequently reported that the initial report on the trial and Dr Golden's experiment appeared in the Oshkosh Daily Northwestern, on June 9, 1906, on the front page. The experiment established that even after cremation for four and a half hours, some remains (including teeth) still identifiable as human existed. Dr Golden was described as an expert witness and was from Chicago, Illinois. Subsequent newspaper reports mentioning Dr Golden and the experiment are in the Post-Crescent, published in Appleton, Wisconsin, October 17, 1930, page 20 and in the Milwaukee Journal, August 10, 1940, page 16. When Inspector Douglas discovered the bone fragments, he wrote that "timber had been dragged from all around to the fire and at each of these places abundance of wood fuel was obtainable in the vicinity". He added that Regan and St Jack had plenty of time to complete the cremations.

After reading about the claims made at the Royal Commission, in 2004 veterinarian Dr John Auty argued that such a cremation was possible and in an experiment cremated a bull completely to ash using one tonne of dry timber collected in the Kimberley area. He stated that, "the same amount of firing would have disposed of five human bodies" (Quadrant Nov 2004).

== St Jack and Regan Trial ==
The local white community funded the patrol's defence and as a result of public sympathy for the accused, only two police officers, Constables St Jack and Regan were subsequently charged in May 1927 with the murder of one Boondung at Dala. However, at a preliminary hearing, the case against St Jack and Regan was dismissed by Magistrate Kidson as the evidence was "insufficient to justify its being placed before a jury". The two constables were promoted and transferred out of the region. Subsequent death threats and attacks on the credibility of Gribble led to his departure from the region.

Historian Neville Green described the massacres as the culmination of years of violence by police and pastoralists against Aboriginal people in the Kimberleys and not an aberration, but part of a culture of decades of violence.

== Later Evidence ==
In January 1968, Dr Neville Green interviewed on audiotape Charles Overheu, the brother of Hays partner and co-owner of Nulla Nulla station Leopold Overheu:

They all got together up there and there was a bloody massacre because I think they shot about three hundred natives all in one hit and there was a hell of a row over it. It was all published in the papers and somebody let the cat out of the bag and anyhow the government and the judges in those times they realised what the trouble was and the whole thing was hushed up you see.

In the same year, Forrest River Aborigines specified that the massacres had taken place at five different sites, and a German scholar, Dr Helmut Reim, from interviews with three Aboriginal elders, concluded that between 80 and 100 Aborigines had been killed in the massacres on the Marndoc Reserve, of which the Forrest River Mission was a small part.

On 6 July 1926, Lily Johnson translated an eyewitness report by Loorabane for the lay preacher John Thomson who recorded it in the mission diary. In 1986, Lily Johnson gave her account as she remembered it to a reporter:

...the police got all those Aborigines from the Kular tribe that lived from the coast to the mission...they put the men on one chain and the women with their children and their kids on another chain. Some of those women had babes at the breast...they killed the men. They just lined them up and shot them one by one...the women had to watch those men being shot...their husbands and brothers and relatives...the men had to collect wood first. They didn't know why they had to collect that wood but they had to get a big pile of it...They lined them up and shot them...then they cut them up into pieces, you know, a leg, an arm, just like that and those bits of body were thrown on the wood...and burnt there...the women were taken to another place just a bit away...and had to stand on the river bank but it was dry that time of year and they were shot there so their bodies just fell into the (dry) river...they bashed the brains out of the babies and threw them into the river with their mothers and burnt the lot (there)...there's a lot of bodies. It took a long time to burn...With the women was a mother and her two kids...they had bush names. They couldn't speak English...The boy's name (was) Numbunnung and the girl was Loorabane...the boy spoke to his sister in language and told her that when that chain came off to grab mum and head for the bush...they were at the end of the chain...but (when they ran away) the police shot at them...they killed the mother and the girl got shot in the leg there (pointing)...they hid in the roots of the pandanus grass in the Forrest River. They hid under water and breathed through a bit of pandanus grass, you know, it's hollow, like a straw...the police looked for them everywhere but they just kept real still, not moving 'cause they were so scared...by evening, when they thought it was safe to leave, they moved out...swam across the Forrest River and travelled all the next day and then the day after until the evening until they reached the mission where they knew they'd be safe...I was playing with the other girls...when Loorabane came...She was shaking with fright...She told us what happened and we told Mamma (Angelina Noble) and Mamma told Jim (Reverend James Noble) and he told old Gribble.

However, during the Royal Commission, conducted in the first half of 1927, the Rev. James Noble was asked (Question 1417 in the Commission record) by Commissioner Wood if "any of the natives told you about blacks being shot and burnt?" Noble replied that no-one had told him and said he had "merely heard the news brought into the station". Similarly, when asked by both Commissioner Wood and by W.N. Nairn, who represented the police officers and other parties under investigation, about the sources of his information about alleged killings, the Rev. Ernest Gribble did not supply the names of any Aborigine or any other person as having provided information although he had recorded the names of Aborigines allegedly killed.

== Accusations of false claims ==
In 1999, journalist Rod Moran published a book Massacre Myth which reviewed the evidence and argued that Gribble had promoted and spread rumours of the alleged massacres and that many of the stories surrounding the events were fabrications by Gribble. Moran notes, for example, that all the allegations of a sexual assault upon Lumbia's wife could be sourced to claims made by Gribble and to the mission journals which were under Gribble's control as head of the Mission. Moran quotes a letter from the Crown Prosecutor in the case which referred to the claim of rape as "somewhat strange...that no statement of this nature was made by Lumbia or any of the native eyewitnesses either at the inquest or the trial". At the Royal Commission, Gribble claimed that Aborigines Department Inspector E.C. Mitchell, who had acted as Lumbia's advocate at his trial, conspired to suppress the alleged rape. Mitchell denied the allegation. Commissioner Wood agreed that the allegation was false and ordered all reference to it removed from the report before it was published. Through an oversight, however, the allegation remained in a letter attached to the report. Mitchell requested that a letter from Wood, which acknowledged that he believed Gribble's allegation was false and that he had ordered it removed, be attached to the report and this was done. Moran reports that, at a preliminary hearing presided over by Rev. Gribble as a Justice of the Peace and at a Coroner's inquest, Lumbia and his wives gave statements about the killing of Hay. The three accounts of the killing concur and were to the effect that Lumbia's wives were in the pool gathering edible bulbs when Hay rode up and attacked Lumbia with a whip for suspected cattle-killing. Acting in anger after the beating, Lumbia speared Hay in the back as he was riding away. The statements, which Moran reports are still on record, also agree on two other points: that Hay had not dismounted his horse until he fell off after being speared and that Lumbia then stripped the body. However, Forrest River Mission records documented several versions of the same event given by several mission translators claiming the rape of one or both of the Aboriginal women by Hay as the motive for his murder by Lumbia.

Moran argues that, as Dr McGillivray had testified that none of the bone fragments were 'distinctive of the human skeleton' and those witnesses who thought that they may have been human had no qualifications or experience in examining burned and fragmented bone, it is probable that most or all the bone fragments found were the remnants of the meals of Aborigines who had camped on the sites. Alternatively, with respect to the presence at various sites of burnt and fragmented bone and teeth that may have been human in origin, Moran reports that the principal Aboriginal funerary practice in the area at the time was to inter the dead covered with bark and branches in hollows and forks of trees. Later, bones would be retrieved from the tree, divided between several bark-wrapped packets and deposited at various places considered to be significant in the life of the deceased, including in and near pools of water. Moran noted that at the Royal Commission, evidence was given that some of the bone fragments were retrieved from ashes around the base of a large tree which had been burned and also that Aborigines from the Mission, acting under Rev. Gribble's instructions, had retrieved other bone fragments and charcoal from the bottom of pools. Moran referred to the evidence given by a J.C. de Lancourt who saw large hunting fires when he travelled through the district in September 1926 and to the testimony of a Capt. Hepburn Tindale who also testified that he had seen large fires in the area that had been set by Aborigines. Natural and deliberately lit bushfires would inevitably result in some trees with human remains in them catching fire with the bones being burned, fragmented and scattered. Moran wrote that in 1934 anthropologist Phyllis Kaberry conducted research in the area and noted tree burials and the later dispersal of bones in the area as late as the mid-1930s. Another practice of the area related to 'the-close-up-dead', very elderly and frail people considered so close to the end of their lives that they were simply taken into the bush by a relative and left to die. Moran argues that these practices, over the thousands of years of Aboriginal occupation of the area, inevitably meant that fragmented human remains were widely scattered over the Kimberleys. He notes that the age of the bone fragments and teeth that were located was never determined and that they could have been decades or centuries old. In 1927, Commissioner Wood had specifically investigated claims that the remains were the result of tree burials affected by bushfires. Wood found that there was no evidence of bushfires at the sites in question; some bone fragments were found in a pool, others in heaps in a creek and, at Mowerie, the bones and teeth were found in three distinct heaps around a tree eliminating the possibility that these had been scattered or transported by any means; the fires were much larger than was customary for Aborigines and that there were no trees in the vicinity large enough to hold native bodies. He stated; "Try as one might to make the actual facts fit the contention, it is impossible." Moran argues that Wood's conduct of the Royal Commission was deeply flawed, that he seemed to approach the investigation as though he had already made his decision and that Wood made findings which ignored or dismissed evidence to the contrary presented at the Royal Commission.

Geoffrey Bolton, historian, wrote about Moran’s “book Massacre Myth, which put the view that there was no evidence that anyone at all had been killed by the police party. This contradicted the view previously taken by most historians, including Henry Reynolds, Neville Green and myself, that on the evidence before him the royal commissioner had probably got it right in assessing the death toll at around a dozen. Careful analysis of Massacre Myth suggested that the evidence for the killings was less substantial than we had supposed, and depended a good deal on the say-so of the missionary Ernest Gribble, who by 1926 was a psychologically troubled man.”

David Day, historian, wrote “... as has recently been argued by Rod Moran, the massacre may have been invented by the mentally disturbed missionary.”

Archaeologist Josephine Flood wrote: "Moran's disassembly of evidence establishes that Wood's findings were a travesty. ... However, the myth of a Forrest River massacre lives on ... The extent of the violence in this region is uncertain, pending detailed studies but Moran's research on this and two other alleged massacres shows it may have been exaggerated."

In a rebuttal of Massacre Myth, Neville Green describes the massacre as probable, but not able to be proven in court. He makes a number of criticisms of Moran's book. For example, Moran cites the evidence of "anthropologist" Hepburn Tindale who, at the time, claimed to be a Fellow of the Royal Geographical Society, to have a master's degree and diploma in anthropology from Oxford University and to have written anthropological articles for English papers. None of these claims were true. Moran refers to anthropologist Phyllis Kaberry's descriptions of Forrest River cremation customs, suggesting that this would explain the cremated remains found at the sites. However, Kaberry also stated that cremation was peculiar to the small Numalo horde and was abandoned after the arrival of Europeans. In regards to Moran's claims that the burnt fragments were the result of bushfires, in 1926 Commissioner Wood stated that "by no stretch of the imagination could it [the remains] be associated with a bushfire". Moran also referred to evidence given at the Royal Commission that the volume of wood required for the cremation of 11 bodies was 16.5 tons, Moran concluded that this was insufficient and suggested that 28.5 tons was required, a figure that historian Keith Windschuttle accepted and used in his own work. Green subsequently conducted a survey of government and municipal agencies and undertakers in regions where open air cremations are still conducted which found that one ton per body is recommended for health reasons although as little as 250 kg per body, or 2.75 tons for all 11, would be more than sufficient.

In his 2002 book, Sex, Maiming and Murder Moran argues that there is no credible evidence that the police patrol killed anyone and that Rev. Gribble had a long history of making false claims against the police and pastoralists.

In a review of Sex, Maiming and Murder for the peer reviewed Australian Aboriginal Studies journal, Sylvia Hallam states that Moran's preface throws some doubts on his claims of impartiality. Hallam further states; "The evidence Moran cites does not always support his conclusions [due to a] lack of adequate context, lack of balance, and insufficient presentation and explication of evidence. This book does not enable me to judge where the truth—or even the balance of probability—lies on most of the matters on which the author makes firm assertions, which he fails fully to justify".

Frontier historian Noel Loos has replied that Moran simply reargued the same case made by the pastoralists' defence lawyer, Walter Nairn, in 1927, believing the police evidence while repeating Nairn's attempt to discredit the evidence and character of the main witness, Ernest Gribble, who had been impugned before the Royal Commission by Walter Nairn, for treating the Aborigines "as the equal of whites," (Note: "In brief, I think he believed so strongly in the innocence of the two policemen and the guilt of Gribble that he became the contemporary Walter Nairn who, as defence lawyer, attacked the credibility of the main prosecution witness, Gribble, his supporters, Aboriginal witnesses, and the evidence they produced, and upheld the testimony of the members of the police patrol." Loos, 2007, p. 109.)

Most historians agree with the general conclusions of the Royal Commission, though without committing themselves to a specific number of victims. In 2003 Neville Green wrote: "The guilt or innocence of the police party accused of murder at Forrest River could not be proven in court and cannot be proven now. In The Forrest River Massacres (1995), I tried to show that given the violent history of the Kimberley the massacre was probable."

== See also ==
- History wars
- List of massacres of Indigenous Australians
