= James Noble (clergyman) =

Australian aboriginal missionary (died 1941)

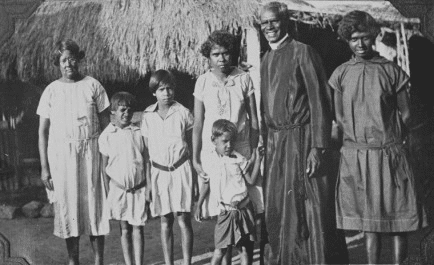
- Angelina family and James c. 1925
- Born: 1876; Boulia
- Died: November 25, 1941 (aged 64–65); Yarrabah
- Occupation: clergyman
- Spouse: Angelina Noble
- Children: 6

James Noble (c1876- 25 November 1941) was a missionary and the first Aboriginal clergyman in the Anglican Church of Australia. He was also a significant source of evidence in investigations into what became called the Forrest River Massacre.

== Biography ==
=== Early life ===
Noble worked as a stockman during the early 1890s. Reputedly born in North Queensland, he later came to work at Invermien station near Scone, New South Wales. He was baptized at there in July 1895.

=== Clerical career ===
In 1896 Noble came to work at Yarrabah Mission near Cairns, Queensland, where he 'became indispensable' to the missionary efforts of superintendent Ernest Gribble. At Yarrabah he married Maggie Frew and they had a son, however both she and the child died shortly afterwards. Noble later married Angelina (c.1879-1964), with whom he had six surviving children.

In 1914 James and Angelina Noble arrived at the newly reopened Forrest River Mission in Western Australia, where they worked for the next eighteen years. In September 1925 Noble became the first Aboriginal Anglican clergyman in Australia, when he was made deacon in a ceremony at St George's Cathedral, Perth.

In 1926 Noble, who was skilled in tracking, went to investigate rumours that the police had massacred Aboriginal people close to the Forrest River. He discovered apparent evidence that people had been tied to trees and shot, before their remains were dismembered and burnt. In 1927 Noble gave evidence before a Royal Commission of Inquiry which concluded that police had probably murdered eleven people, but could not ascertain which individuals had been responsible.

After their return to Yarrabah in 1932, the Nobles went to work with Gribble at the Palm Island mission. Two years later, Noble's poor health forced him to retire from Palm Island, and he returned with his family to Yarrabah. He died in 1941 after suffering injuries in a fall.
