= Oombulgurri Community, Western Australia =

Former community in Western Australia

Oombulgurri
- Town
- Interactive map of Oombulgurri
- Coordinates: 15°11′00″S 127°51′00″E
- Country: Australia
- State: Western Australia
- LGA: Shire of Wyndham-East Kimberley
- Location: 45 km (28 mi) from Wyndham; 120 km (75 mi) from Kununurra
- Established: 1973
- Abolished: 2011

Government
  - State electorate: Kimberley
  - Federal division: Durack

Area
  - Total: 12,184.3 km^{2} (4,704.4 sq mi)
- Elevation: 385 m (1,263 ft)

Population
  - Total: 27 (SAL 2021)
- Postcode: 6740
- Mean max temp: 33.1 °C (91.6 °F)
- Mean min temp: 18.6 °C (65.5 °F)
- Annual rainfall: 1,106.6 mm (43.57 in)

Oombulgurri, also written as Umbulgara and Oombulgarri, was an Aboriginal community in the eastern Kimberley, 45 kilometres (28 mi) by air and about 210 kilometres (130 mi) by road northwest of Wyndham. It was first established as the Forrest River Mission in 1913. It had a population of 107 as of the 2006 census. It was inhabited by the Yeidji people who now self-identify as Balanggarra. In 2011, the government of Western Australia encouraged residents of Oombulgurri to move elsewhere, after it deemed the community unsustainable. The last residents from Oombulgurri were relocated to Wyndham just before Christmas 2011. There is still a locality with this name that includes the surrounding area, which had a population of 27 at the 2021 census.

== History ==
=== Mission establishment ===
The Anglican Forrest River Mission for Aborigines was founded in 1896–97 by Harold Hale but was abandoned after a few months. A permanent mission, known as the Forrest River Mission, was established on the site in 1913 by the bishop of the north west, Gerard Trower. In December 1913, Anglican priest Ernest Gribble took charge, three years after he was forced to resign as superintendent at Yarrabah. His key assistants included James and Angelina Noble. Gribble remained as superintendent until the early 1930s.

In 1926 the mission was plagued by an influenza epidemic and impacted by the Forrest River massacre, where police killed a number of Aboriginal people.

The mission was closed in 1969, after the 1967 Aboriginal referendum.

In 1973, fifty Aboriginal people decided to resettle their abandoned tribal land and rename it Oombulgurri. Within a year, the population had grown to 200. Infrastructure and welfare programs were set up in the 1970s and 1980s to provide the residents with basic amenities and to allow the town to become self-sufficient.

=== Child sex investigation ===
After a report was compiled on an alleged paedophile ring at the Aboriginal community of Kalumburu in the Kimberley, a police investigation in 2007 resulted in the arrests of three men and a juvenile from Oombulgurri, including a former chairman of the community; two men and the juvenile were charged.

=== Coronial inquest into Aboriginal deaths ===
In 2007 a coronial inquiry began into Aboriginal deaths in the Kimberley, including five in Oombulgurri. It revealed high levels of alcohol abuse, suicide and child neglect in Oombulgurri. Following the inquest, in November 2008 alcohol was banned in Oombulgurri.

== Closure ==
In October 2010, the government of Western Australia announced plans to close the community of Oombulgurri, as its population had decreased from 150 to less than 50. In February 2011, the government was reportedly considering a number of proposals about the community's future once all the residents had moved out, including converting it into a tourism retreat or a juvenile justice facility. On 1 March 2011, the community's only store was dismantled and removed by boat. As of 2 March 2011, only seven residents still remained in Oombulgurri. Shortly before Christmas of 2011, the remaining residents were relocated to Wyndham. In 2014 the state government demolished most of the buildings at the site, despite opposition by former residents and a campaign to prevent the demolition by Amnesty International Australia.

== Access ==
Oombulgurri is only reliably accessible by boat or by air, as the unsealed track leading from Home Valley Station to the community is washed out most of the year due to the wet season; the total road distance from the nearest town, Wyndham, is about 210 kilometres (130 mi). There is an airstrip nearby for light aircraft. Access is also possible via a dirt road from Kalumburu; the distance from there to Oombulgurri is 308 kilometres (191 mi).
