= Angelina Noble =

Australian linguist and missionary (1879 – 1964)

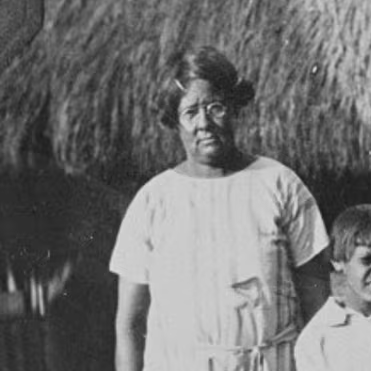
- Born: c.1879 Colony of Queensland
- Died: 19 October 1964; Yarrabah
- Other names: Tommy and Mamma
- Education: mission school
- Occupation: missionary
- Spouse: James Noble
- Children: 6
- Parent: unknown

Angelina Noble (c.1879 – 19 October 1964) was an Australian linguist and missionary. She and her husband founded churches and missions in Australia.

== Life ==
Noble was born in Winton in the Colony of Queensland in about 1879. She was of European and Aboriginal ancestry, but her parents are unknown. She first came to light when she was dressed as a boy named Tommy. She had been abducted as a child slave by a horse dealer. The local police in Cairns took an interest and she was sent to Yarrabah mission school. She was a good student, and she showed a talent for languages. In time she could speak at least five aboriginal languages.

She married James Noble who was a widower employed by the Reverend Ernest Gribble at Bellenden Ker mission. Gribble had a small number of aboriginal Christian supporters, but James was the most important. James had lost his first wife and their child, and after that, his would be second wife had died too. James was aboriginal and had become Gribble's close assistant. He stood in for Gribble and he became a lay-reader at St John's parish, Cairns in 1901. She and James helped Aboriginal people resettle at Yarrabah. In 1904 they went to the Mitchell River to choose a location for a new mission.

In 1909 they created another new mission on the Roper River and they and Horace Reid volunteered to work there where Angelina's gift for languages was important.

In 1914 they founded a very small mission that has really just a hut on the Forrest River. They served there for eighteen years with Ernest Gribble. Their presence has been credited with keeping Gribble alive. Angelina offered medical help there and until 1920 she was only female missionary. In 1926 there was a massacre of aboriginal people by two Australian policeman. Her husband contributed to the enquiry as he had gathered evidence of the burning of the bodies. At the subsequent inquest Angelina was a translator. In accounts of the massacre they refer to Angelina as "Mamma". In 13 September 1925 her husband became the first aboriginal clergyman and they returned to the Forrest River.

In 1933 they were at the Palm Island mission where she was an assistant minister's wife. The returned to Forrest River and James died in 1941.

Noble died in St Lukes hospital on 19 October 1964 in Yarrabah. The Angelina Noble Centre is a cross cultural centre for women founded by Evelyn Hibbert in 2019.
