= Ernest Gribble =

Australian missionary (1868–1957)

Ernest Richard Bulmer Gribble (23 November 1868 – 18 October 1957) was an Australian missionary. Though considered to be temperamentally unsuited to his vocation, he became a strong advocate for better treatment of Australian Aboriginal people, saving whose 'remnants' he considered part of his mission.

== Early life ==
He was born at Chilwell in Geelong, Australia in 1868, the son of John Brown Gribble and Mary Gribble (née Bulmer), and the eldest of nine children. His father was a Methodist and then Congregational Union, and finally Anglican missionary who, disturbed by the systematic injustices visited on Aboriginal people as he had observed them in Jerilderie and elsewhere, wrote A Plea for the Aborigines of New South Wales, and established the Warangesda Mission on the Murrumbidgee River (1880).

Despite excelling in sports, Gribble was weak academically during his schooling at The King's School, Parramatta. Dissuaded from following a military career, he joined his father in a short-lived attempt to set up a mission at Gascoyne River in Western Australia. Local settlers ostracized John Brown Gribble for his public protests at the abuses of Aboriginal workers. The mission had to be closed in 1887.

== Career ==
After a time working as a stockman and drover, Ernest accepted a curacy at Tumbarumba in New South Wales for financial reasons. In 1892 John Brown Gribble, who had opened a mission at Yarrabah in Queensland, fell ill, and called on Ernest to take it over in his stead. His father died soon afterwards, and Ernest seems to have been driven by guilt and remorse in pursuing his father's footsteps.

Ordained an Anglican priest in 1899, he went on to convert local Aboriginal people, Angelina Noble was an early female missionary and James Noble, became the first Aboriginal person to be ordained deacon. Gribble showed little comprehension of Aboriginal culture, failing to learn even elementary words of the local language at Yarrabah, which he eventually left in 1909, after suffering a breakdown from overwork according to Harris, from guilt over having a child with an Aboriginal woman in 1908, a year after he separated from his wife Emilie Julie Wriede. Gribble had expressed his public opposition to miscegenation. His breakdown could be attributed to the recognition of his own hypocrisy in speaking out publicly against relationships between Aboriginal and non-Aboriginal people. At the same time, he had developed a relationship with an Aboriginal woman. He was forced to 'retire' from his position at Yarrabah in the face of pressure from the Anglican church.

== Forrest River ==
His next mission, in 1913, was to run the Forrest River Mission, which depended on forced removals of indigenous people to maintain itself, and was on the verge of collapse at the time, and which he was asked to take over. His method of management has been described as one of 'autocratic paternalism'. Others speak of his embrace of muscular Christianity. A. P. Elkin regarded him as an incompetent superintendent, dismissing him as a 'conceited, uncouth tyrant' running a 'stud farm' for breeding natives. The food served at the mission was a notorious sludge of porridge, salted meat and stale bread. Under his administration, the sexes were segregated; children were isolated from their parents and relatives by being confined to dormitories, and generally, he seems to have instituted the kind of military barracks system of regimentation, with uniforms, parades and policing, typical of the career he aspired to as a youth.

He played a key role in inquiries that exposed the role of police in murdering Aboriginal persons in an incident known as the Forrest River massacre in 1926.

His activism led to him being shunned by the non-Aboriginal community, and he was dismissed soon afterwards, in 1928, contributing factors being his mismanagement of finances, and the discovery that he had hidden from police investigators facts that would have implicated an Aboriginal resident at the mission in a tribal murder.

His offer to take over as chaplain on the Aboriginal penal settlement on Palm Island was accepted and he spent his later years there in that capacity. He refused, despite failing health, to retire, and was forcibly removed from his post to Yarrabah in 1957, where he died on 18 October.

He was awarded an OBE in 1956.

== Evaluations ==
One of his biographers endorses the widespread view among settlers that he acted intemperately, a trait he appears to have inherited from his father:

Gribble was very much the son of his father: headstrong, self-righteous, authoritarian, with a permanent chip on his shoulder and a tendency to blame others for his or the mission's misfortunes. He thought nothing of knocking down an [Aboriginal person ...] who did something to displease him, or of "arresting" [Aboriginal persons ...] caught killing the mission cattle'.

== Works ==
- (1930) Forty Years with the Aborigines (Sydney).
- (1932) The Problem of the Australian Aboriginal.
- (1933) A Despised Race: The Vanishing Aboriginals of Australia.

== Notes and references ==
=== References ===
- Dixon, R. M. W. (1977). A Grammar of Yidin. Cambridge University Press. ISBN 978-0-521-21462-9.
- Gribble, John Brown (1879). A Plea for the [Aboriginal People ...] of New South Wales. Rex Nan Kivell Collection. Jerilderie: Samuel Gill & Co. OCLC 220553982. nla.obj-52756199 – via Trove.
- Gulambali, Beverley; Elphick, Don (2003). "Camp of Mercy:An Historical and Biographical Record of the Warangesda Aboriginal Mission/Station Darlington Point New South Wales" (PDF). Gulambali Aboriginal Research.
- Halse, Christine (1996). "Gribble, Ernest Richard Bulmer (Ernie) (1868–1957)". In Serle, Geoffrey (ed.). Australian Dictionary of Biography. Vol. 14. Melbourne University Press.
- Harris, John W (1999). "Ernest Gribble". In Anderson, Gerald H. (ed.). Biographical Dictionary of Christian Missions. William B. Eerdmans Publishing Company. ISBN 978-0-802-84680-8.
