= Cape Grafton =

Cape in Queensland, Australia

- Headland
- Location within Queensland
- Coordinates: 16°51′54″S 145°54′58″E
- Location: Yarrabah, Far North Queensland

Cape Grafton is a cape located to the north-east of Cairns in Queensland, Australia. The cape was named by Lieutenant James Cook during his first voyage of discovery in 1770. It was named after Augustus FitzRoy, 3rd Duke of Grafton, the British prime minister when Cook sailed. Cook set anchor two miles from the shore and briefly inspected the cape with botanists Joseph Banks and Daniel Solander.

The Aboriginal community of Yarrabah is located here. It was founded by John Gribble in 1892.

The cape provides protection to an extensive population of mangroves in the south of Trinity Bay.

== History ==
Gunggay (also known as Gunggandji, Kongandji, Kongkandji, Gungganyji, Idindji and Yidiny) is an Aboriginal language of Far North Queensland. The Gunggay language region of Cape Grafton includes the landscape within the local government boundaries of the Cairns Regional Council and Yarrabah Community Council.
