= Forrest River massacre =

Massacre in Western Australia

- Coordinates: 15°12′S 127°51′E
- Country: Australia
- State: Western Australia

The Forrest River massacre (or Oombulgurri massacre) was a massacre of Indigenous Australian people by a group of law enforcement personnel and civilians in June 1926, in the wake of the killing of a pastoralist in the Kimberley region of Western Australia.

An initial police inquiry concluded that sixteen Aboriginal people were killed and their remains burnt. Subsequently, a Royal Commission was organised in 1927 to further investigate the matter. This Commission found that eleven Aboriginal people were murdered and burnt at several different locations. Two Western Australian police constables who participated in the punitive expedition that led to the massacre, James St Jack and Denis Regan, were arrested and charged with murder. Despite the findings of the commission and police investigation, the case never went to trial, with a preliminary hearing concluding that a jury would not be able to make a conviction. Lumbia, the Aboriginal man who killed the pastoralist Frederick Hay, was, however, convicted in a separate proceeding. The total number of victims of the punitive expedition led by St Jack and Regan is unclear, the highest being in the hundreds given by the brother of one of the participants in the massacre. The authoritative website Colonial Frontier Massacres in Australia, 1788-1930, notes that the latter figure 'is highly unlikely and is in dispute'.

Regardless of official police and governmental investigations concluding that a large number of people were killed during the police operation, denials of this massacre continued until at least the early 2000s.

== Background ==
In 1926, Leopold Rupert Overheu and Frederick Hay jointly held the Nulla Nulla property near Wyndham in the Kimberley region of Western Australia. Their property bordered the Forrest River Aboriginal Mission (later renamed Oombulgurri) run by Reverend Ernest Gribble. Over previous years, Frederick Hay had repeatedly taken and molested Aboriginal women with Gribble making complaints to authorities about his behaviour. In 1924, Hay had also seriously injured an Aboriginal man after hitting him over the head with his rifle butt. Hay and Overheu complained about the spearing of their cattle by local Aboriginal people, Overheu claiming the value of the speared cattle to be £10,000. In response, their property was declared a prohibited area under the 1905 Aborigines Act preventing indigenous people from entering or crossing it to reach other areas.

=== Initial massacre at Durragee ===
On 18 May 1926, Overheu made a formal complaint that a large group of Aboriginal people were spearing cattle at Nulla Nulla. Constable James St Jack of the Western Australia Police based at Wyndham was directed to investigate this killing of cattle. St Jack with his two Aboriginal assistants, Windie Joe and Jacob, set out from Wyndham and met up with Overheu and his Aboriginal servants Tommy Doort and Lyddie on the lower Pentecost River.

The group then travelled toward the Nulla Nulla property and camped for the night near Durragee Hill, close to where around 300 Aboriginal people were holding a ceremony on an island in the river. At dawn on 24 May 1926, St Jack armed Windie Joe, Jacob, and Tommy with shotguns and the patrol rushed the camp to disperse the indigenous people. Those who survived reported that many were injured and that two older men, Blui-Nua and Umbillie were killed by being beaten over the head with a stirrup iron or a rifle butt. An eyewitness to the Durragee Hill attack, Gladys Birch, many years later stated that several women and children were herded to the top of a cliff and pushed off while nine men were shot and thrown in a bonfire at Durragee. St Jack and Overheu testified later that they had shot no humans but had shot 31 dogs. However, witnesses described people being wounded by both bullets and shotgun pellets.

After the dispersal at Durragee, the patrol continued to the Nulla Nulla Homestead arriving after dark to find Frederick Hay missing. The next morning Windie and Tommy were sent to try and find Hay. Hay's body was found later that same day 12 kilometres (7.5 mi) north-east of the homestead.

=== The killing of Frederick Hay ===
On 23 May 1926, an Aboriginal man named Lumbia and his child-wives, Anulgoo and Goolool, were resting at Johnson Billabong on the Nulla Nulla property when Hay rode up and demanded sex with Anulgoo. Hay then stripped down to his boots and raped her in front of Lumbia before indicating an intention to take her back to the Nulla Nulla with him. When Lumbia objected Hay attacked him with his stock-whip then broke his spears. Without bothering to dress Hay gathered his clothes, mounted his horse and began to ride off but Lumbia grabbed a broken shovel spear and stabbed him in the back with it, killing him. Anulgoo later stated that, during the argument, Hay had shot at Lumbia, and the bullet grazed his head. Hay's pistol was found to have a spent cartridge in the chamber.

When Hay's body was found by the search party led by Constable St Jack, it had been largely consumed by predators and initially it could not be determined whether the remains were those of a white man or an Aboriginal person. According to the police report, the body still wore boots when found, which revealed white skin when removed. The district medical officer at Wyndham, Dr Arthur Adams, arrived from Wyndham two days later to conduct Hay's autopsy following which, due to the advanced state of decomposition, Hay was buried at the spot. St Jack and Overheu at this time had no knowledge that Lumbia had killed Hay and assumed that a large group of Aboriginal people were instead responsible for Hay's murder. On hearing of Hay's death, another armed group was organised at Wyndham where Richard Jolly and Bernard O'Leary were sworn in as special constables under the supervision of Constable Denis Regan. Overheu expressed that he wanted a strong armed force to go out and "deal drastically" with the local Aboriginal people.

== Forrest River punitive expedition ==
Regan's patrol left Wyndham on 1 June meeting up with St Jack's patrol at a place called Jowa in the headwaters of the Forrest River on 5 June 1926. In the days before Regan's group arrived, it appears that St Jack and Overheu had already been conducting extrajudicial killings of local Aboriginal people in the area with Overheu's Aboriginal servant Tommy Doort later admitting to killing a woman and her baby during this time.

=== Members of the police patrol ===
The combined police patrol that met at Jowa on 5 June now consisted of 13 men and a woman. It was led by two constables of the Western Australia Police.

- Constable James Graham St Jack, from Wyndham police station.
- Constable Denis Hastings Regan, from Turkey Creek police station.

They were accompanied by two civilians sworn in as special constables, namely:

- Bernard Patrick O'Leary. Pastoralist at Galway Valley Station.
- Richard John Jolly. Unemployed labourer.

Two others, a settler and a veterinary surgeon, accompanied the force:

- Leopold Rupert Overheu. Hay's partner on the Nulla Nulla station.
- Daniel Murnane. An Australian government veterinary surgeon from Victoria.

Five Aboriginal trackers, three professional police trackers and a further two hired for the job.

- Jim McDonald (Mulga Jim) Police tracker born in Northern Territory.
- Frank. Police tracker from Turkey Creek.
- Jacob. Police tracker from Wyndham.
- Windie Joe. Special police tracker.
- Sulieman. Afghan/Aboriginal tracker.

In addition, there were a further three members of the group.

- Charlie. Aboriginal servant of O'Leary.
- Tommy Doort. Aboriginal servant of Overheu.
- Lyddie Goolara. Wife of Tommy and servant of Overheu.

All members with the exception of Lyddie were armed with .44 Winchester rifles. Additionally all the whites carried sidearms and the Aboriginal people were also given shotguns to replace their rifles when raiding camps. The patrol took 500 rounds of ammunition and were later supplied with a further 350 rounds (seven empty ammunition boxes were later found at one of the police camps). Although Regan was required to supply a written report accounting for every shot fired and to collect and return all used shell casings as proof, he never did so. 42 pack horses and mules carried the supplies for this substantial punitive expedition.

=== First stage of the Forrest River massacre ===
On 6 June 1926, the police patrol travelled to a place known as Wodgil in the upper reaches of the Forrest River. Here they camped for two days where they managed to round up and take prisoner a number of Aboriginal people. Seven of these, 4 males and 3 females, were forcibly taken to nearby creek beds named Gotegotemerrie and Mowerie. At the former site the four men were killed and their remains burnt in makeshift ground ovens covered in large flat rocks. At the latter site, the three women were likewise disposed of. The remnant ashes, teeth and bone fragments were then dumped in the shallow pools of the creek beds.

On 10 June 1926 the police patrol moved on to another site known as Police Camp No. 3 some kilometres to the north of Wodgil. Here they rounded up another nine local Aboriginal people, 5 males and 4 females. The captives were taken to a nearby ravine where they were killed and their remains burnt in a large contained bonfire. The ashes and the burnt remains, including thousands of fragments of bones, were later discovered dumped next to the killing site in the ravine.

On 14 June 1926 the group raided a large encampment of Aboriginal people and took 34 prisoners. They interrogated their captives about the killing of Hay but apparently later released them with no casualties. By this stage the punitive expedition was running low on supplies and the group's leaders decided to go to the Nulla Nulla homestead and the Forrest River mission to resupply.

After arriving at Nulla Nulla, Daniel Murnane, a visiting veterinary surgeon who had volunteered for the patrol as he was a friend of Hay, decided to leave the expedition and return to Wyndham. On 19 June 1926 Murnane arrived at Wyndham where he gave initial reports about the punitive expedition. It was alleged that he said that "it was worse than the war" and that he "had enough of it", statements that he later denied. Upon hearing these reports, Sergeant Arthur Buckland, who was in charge of the Wyndham police, decided to recall the patrol and he left to rendezvous with them at the Forrest River mission.

=== Second stage of the Forrest River massacre ===
The Reverend Ernest Gribble at the Forrest River mission had already heard reports that the patrol had killed several Aboriginal people and was worried that other innocent Aboriginal people might be killed. When members of the patrol arrived at the mission for supplies, he informed them that the local Aboriginal people had told him that Lumbia had killed Hay. Gribble advised them that they should be able to find Lumbia near the Lyne River to the north of the mission. The Aboriginal community at the mission supported the arrest of Lumbia, and Gribble supplied two Aboriginal men from the mission, Aldoa and Herbert, to guide the patrol to Lumbia. Sergeant Buckland arrived at the mission on 24 June to recall the punitive expedition but as the police were now searching for a specific suspect, he allowed it to continue, albeit in a reduced form. Buckland took Jolly back to Wyndham with him, while Overheu and O'Leary and their Aboriginal servants returned to Nulla Nulla. The police patrol now consisted of constables Regan and St Jack, accompanied by four Aboriginal trackers Mulga Jim, Frank, Windie Joe and Sulieman. The patrol also now included Aldoa and Herbert, the guides from the mission.

The group set out to arrest Lumbia and arrived at a place called Dala near the Lyne River on 27 June 1926. Here they captured two men and two women named Gumbol, Boondung, Bungomerrie and Newringie. Constables St Jack and Regan took these prisoners to a nearby creek bed away from the police camp where they chained them to a tree and shot them dead. They then burnt the prisoners' remains in a fire and dumped the resultant ashes and bone fragments in a shallow waterhole in the creek bed.

On 1 July 1926 the patrol raided a large encampment of Aboriginal people on the Lyne River. Here they captured Lumbia and took 30 other people prisoner. They then proceeded back to the Forrest River mission with these prisoners and arrived on the outskirts of the mission settlement on 4 July. Gribble heard of the patrol's arrival and was concerned that some of these prisoners would be summarily executed. He made his way to the police camp and convinced Regan and St Jack to release all their captives apart from Lumbia and three others. Lumbia was then questioned through an interpreter and confessed to having killed Hay.

== Investigations ==
=== Initial reports of killings ===
While the punitive expedition was being conducted, various verbal reports of the killings were given by Aboriginal people to Gribble and by Murnane to the public at Wyndham when he opted out of the patrol. In the weeks following the conclusion of the police patrol, several Aboriginal people attended the Forrest River mission with bullet wounds. C. R. Herschell, the managing director for Pathé films in Victoria, happened to be visiting the Forrest River mission at that time and was able to take multiple photographs and movie films of the wounded survivors and grieving relatives. Additionally, Overheu's servant Tommy talked about the massacres he participated in to some bush Aboriginal people who passed on the story to Gribble. Overheu found out about Tommy's conversations and Tommy soon after disappeared. He was assumed to have been shot by Overheu.

Gribble calculated that 30 men and women were missing, and suspected had been killed by the police party. Local Aboriginal people claimed up to 100 men women and children had been killed. In 1968, Charles Overheu stated that his brother Leopold, who was a member of the police patrol, had told him that the patrol had killed at least 300.

=== Police investigation ===
On 12 August 1926, Gribble, accompanied by Inspector E. C. Mitchell of the Western Australian Aborigines Department in Wyndham, visited two of the massacre sites at Mowerie and Gotegotemerrie. Mitchell reported that he found considerable evidence of attempts to clean up the site and that he had recovered a quantity of intact human teeth and skull fragments from the ashes of a large fire nearby. Mitchell sent a telegram to the Chief Protector, A. O. Neville:

Shocking revelations, saw place Forrest River, rocky higher bed where [... Aboriginal persons] chained small tree killed there then bodies burnt improvised oven.

Two weeks later, the chief of police in the Kimberley region, Inspector William Douglas, personally conducted an extensive investigation of some of the massacre sites. At one site he noted finding dark stains that had human hairs attached on a rock slab behind a tree near where the fire had been. Accompanied by Suleiman, an Aboriginal tracker who participated in the massacres, Douglas traced the movements of the police patrol from Mowerie and Gotegotemerrie to the ravine near Police Camp No.3. Sulieman stated that Regan, O'Leary and Murnane led nine prisoners in chains into the ravine, returning the next morning alone. Here Douglas "found the remains of a large fire and some thousands of fragments of bone in the ashes". At most of the sites much of the ash had been scooped from the fires and thrown into nearby billabongs where charcoal and bone fragments were still visible on the bottom. Douglas later sent other officers to investigate the massacre site at Dala where similar evidence of shooting, burning and dumping of human remains was found.

Douglas' official report to the police commissioner stated that,

sixteen [... Aboriginal persons] were burned in three lots; one, six and nine; only fragments of bone not larger than one inch [25 mm] remain.

== Wood Royal Commission ==
Douglas' report was handed to Robert Connell the Western Australia police commissioner, who recommended a Royal Commission be organised. The Premier of Western Australia, Philip Collier, approved the creation of the Royal Commission to be overseen by George Tuttle Wood. This 1927 Wood Royal Commission was tasked to investigate the killing and burning of bodies of Aboriginal people in the vicinity of the Forrest River Mission and the disappearance of key witnesses.

Many witnesses retracted statements, refused to testify or simply disappeared and several key Aboriginal witnesses to the killings "escaped" from custody at Wyndham before they could give evidence to the commission. No legal assistance was given to represent the Aboriginal case, while a police subscription fund organised by Leopold Overheu was able to pay for a respected legal counsel in Walter Nairn to defend the police and settlers. Commissioner Wood observed that the constables lied consistently during the inquiry and the testimonies given by most of the members of the police patrol was unreliable. Wood was able to conduct part of the inquiry at the Forrest River region where he saw firsthand the Dala massacre site and was firmly convinced of the physical evidence he found there.

The Royal Commission of inquiry concluded that 11 people had been murdered and their bodies burned at Gotegotemerrie, Mowerie and Dala, with a further 9 people meeting a similar fate at a separate site named Police Camp No.3.

== Trial of James St Jack and Denis Regan ==
On the recommendation of the Royal Commission, constables James St Jack and Denis Regan were arrested and charged in May 1927 with the murder of Boondung at the massacre site of Dala. However, at a preliminary hearing, the case against St Jack and Regan was dismissed by Magistrate Alfred Kidson as he viewed the evidence as being "insufficient to justify its being placed before a jury". The two constables were reinstated to their positions but later transferred out of the Kimberley region. According to historian Neville Green, expert witnesses for the defense lied about their qualifications, including a supposed anthropologist who falsely claimed to have an Oxford degree and dismissed evidence that police had cremated the bodies as evidence of indigenous burial customs.

== Aftermath ==
=== Lumbia ===
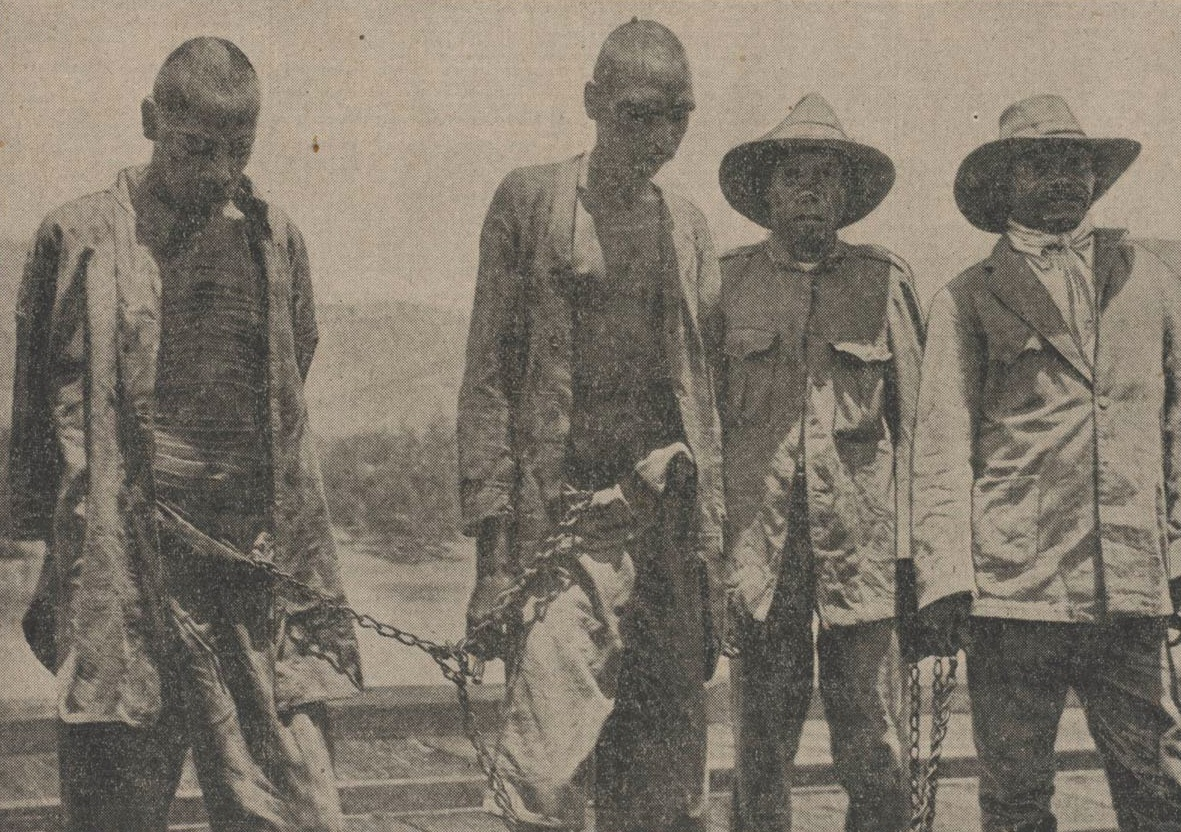
Lumbia (on left) following his arrest in 1926

At the inquest into Hay's death on 3 August 1926, held in Wyndham courthouse, Lumbia was defended by Ernest Mitchell, Inspector of Aborigines in the North-West Department, who also served as interpreter. Mitchell argued that Lumbia acted in self-defence, and the evidence given in court was indeed that he had first been struck by Hay. The same defence was offered at Lumbia's trial, held on 28 October 1926 before the Resident Magistrate of Broome, Colonel W.O. Mansbridge, who travelled to Wyndham to hear the case before a jury. Found guilty, he was sentenced to death although the sentence subsequently being commuted to life imprisonment. Lumbia was imprisoned on Rottnest Island until the prison was closed in 1929 when he was transferred to the Broome Regional Prison. In 1935 he was sent to the Moola Bulla settlement near Halls Creek. In 1936 he walked 430 kilometres (270 mi) to the Forrest River Mission and no attempts were made to return him to finish his sentence. In December 1944 Lumbia killed his second wife, Waldjanurri, and was sentenced to death for murder; he escaped and was recaptured but was released after serving two weeks for the escape. Sent back to Moola Bulla he contracted leprosy and returned to Forrest River where he died in 1950.

=== Leopold Overheu ===
Leopold Overheu quit the Nulla Nulla property and for a time worked as a book-keeper for a number of station owners to raise funds to support the legal defence of the two constables, St Jack and Regan. In 1927 Overheu moved to Perth. He was a son of a prominent Pingelly farmer in Heinrich Overheu, and was able to re-establish himself at Donnybrook where he died in 1949.

=== James St Jack ===
Constable James St Jack remained with the Western Australia police and was stationed at various places around the state including Perth, Kojonup, Bunbury and Carnarvon. His wife, Florence Drage, died in 1937 and he married his second wife, Annie Leabeter, a year later. He had several children. St Jack rose to the rank of sergeant and retired in 1960. He died at Shoalwater, Western Australia in 1993.

=== Denis Regan ===
Constable Denis Regan also remained with the Western Australia police and was posted to similar locations to St Jack including Perth and Kojonup. He married Emily Finch in 1928 but had an affair with Valma Jaffrey in 1942 which caused his divorce and resignation from the police force. He later lived around Kalgoorlie and died in Perth in 1966.

=== Daniel Murnane ===
Daniel Murnane continued his career as a veterinary officer and later also obtained the rank of major in the Australian military. He became a principal research officer in the CSIRO and won the Australian Veterinary Association's highest honour in the Gilruth Prize in 1968. He died in 1970. His daughter, Merrilyn Murnane, was a respected paediatrician and she established the $25,000 Dr Daniel Murnane Scholarship for students at Ormond College at the University of Melbourne.

== Later evidence ==
In January 1968, Dr Neville Green interviewed on audiotape Charles Overheu, the brother of Hay's partner and co-owner of Nulla Nulla station Leopold Overheu:

They all got together up there and there was a bloody massacre because I think they shot about three hundred [... Aboriginal persons] all in one hit and there was a hell of a row over it. It was all published in the papers and somebody let the cat out of the bag and anyhow the government and the judges in those times they realised what the trouble was and the whole thing was hushed up you see.

In the same year, Forrest River Aboriginal people specified that the massacres had taken place at five different sites, and a German scholar, Dr Helmut Reim, from interviews with three Aboriginal elders, concluded that between 80 and 100 Aboriginal people had been killed in the massacres on the Marndoc Reserve, of which the Forrest River Mission was a small part.

== Denials of the massacres ==
During the proceedings of the 1927 Royal Commission, George Tuttle Wood who oversaw the proceedings, commented that a "conspiracy of silence" blanketed the testimonies given to the inquest. Witnesses either disappeared or were otherwise influenced to not testify or give misleading statements. Wood found that constables St Jack and Regan and other members of the patrol consistently lied to the commission to protect themselves and that they denied any killings despite the existence of written, verbal and physical evidence. Denials of any massacre occurring at Forrest River continued with the Western Australia Police refusing to acknowledge that the massacre occurred until at least 2001.

Conservative commentators over the years since the Forrest River massacres have occasionally produced articles denying it ever happened. For instance, in 1999 journalist Rod Moran published a book Massacre Myth arguing that the massacres were the invention of Reverend Gribble. This is despite the official police and governmental investigations concluding that at least 11 to 20 people were killed by the police patrol. Most historians agree with the general conclusions of the Royal Commission, though without committing themselves to a specific number of victims.

== See also ==
- List of massacres in Australia
- List of massacres of Indigenous Australians

== General references ==
- Austin, Tom (1989). A Cry in the Wind: Conflict in Western Australia 1829 – 1929. Darlington Publishing. ISBN 978-0-958-71062-6.
- Auty, Kate (2004). "Patrick Bernard O'Leary and the Forrest River massacres, Western Australia: examining 'Wodgil' and the significance of 8 June 1926" (PDF). Aboriginal History. 28: 122–155.
- Bolton, Geoffrey (2010). "Reflections on Oombulgurri". Studies in Western Australian History. 26: 176–190.
- Brown, Cavan (1999). The Blackfellow's Friend. Bassendean: Access Press. ISBN 978-0-864-45121-7.
- Canlley, P. F. (July 1995). "A Clergyman's Undoing" (PDF). West Australian Law Review: 201–205.
- Day, David (2001) [First published 1996]. Claiming a Continent, A New History of Australia. HarperCollins. ISBN 978-0-732-26976-0.
- Elder, Bruce (2003) [First published 1998]. Blood on the Wattle: Massacres and maltreatment of Aboriginal Australians since 1788. New Holland Publishers. ISBN 978-1-741-10008-2.
- Fitzgerald, Brian (December 1984). "'Blood on the saddle': the Forrest River massacres, 1926". Studies in Western Australian History (8): 16–25.
- Flood, Josephine (2006). The Original Australians: Story of the Aboriginal People. Allen & Unwin. ISBN 978-1-741-14872-5.
- Green, Neville (1995). The Forrest River massacres. Fremantle: Fremantle Arts Centre Press. ISBN 3-540-63293-X.
- Green, Neville (July–August 2003). "The Evidence for the Forrest River Massacre". Quadrant. 47 (7/8): 39–43.
- Green, Neville (2010). "Dilemmas, Dramas and Damnation in Contested History". Studies in Western Australian History. 26: 203–214.
- Halse, Christine (2002). A Terribly Wild Man. Allen & Unwin. ISBN 978-1-86508-753-5.
- Loos, Noel (2007). White Christ black cross: The emergence of a Black church. Aboriginal Studies Press. ISBN 978-0-855-75553-9.
- Moran, Rod (1999). Massacre myth: An investigation into allegations concerning the mass murder of Aborigines at Forrest River. Bassendean: Access Press. ISBN 0-86445-124-5.
- Moran, Rod (2002). Sex, Maiming and Murder: Seven case studies into the reliability of Reverend E.R.B. Gribble, Superintendent, Forrest River Mission 1913-1928, as a witness to the truth. Bassendean: Access Press. ISBN 0-86445-157-1.
