= Yarrabah, Queensland =

Yarrabah
- Town
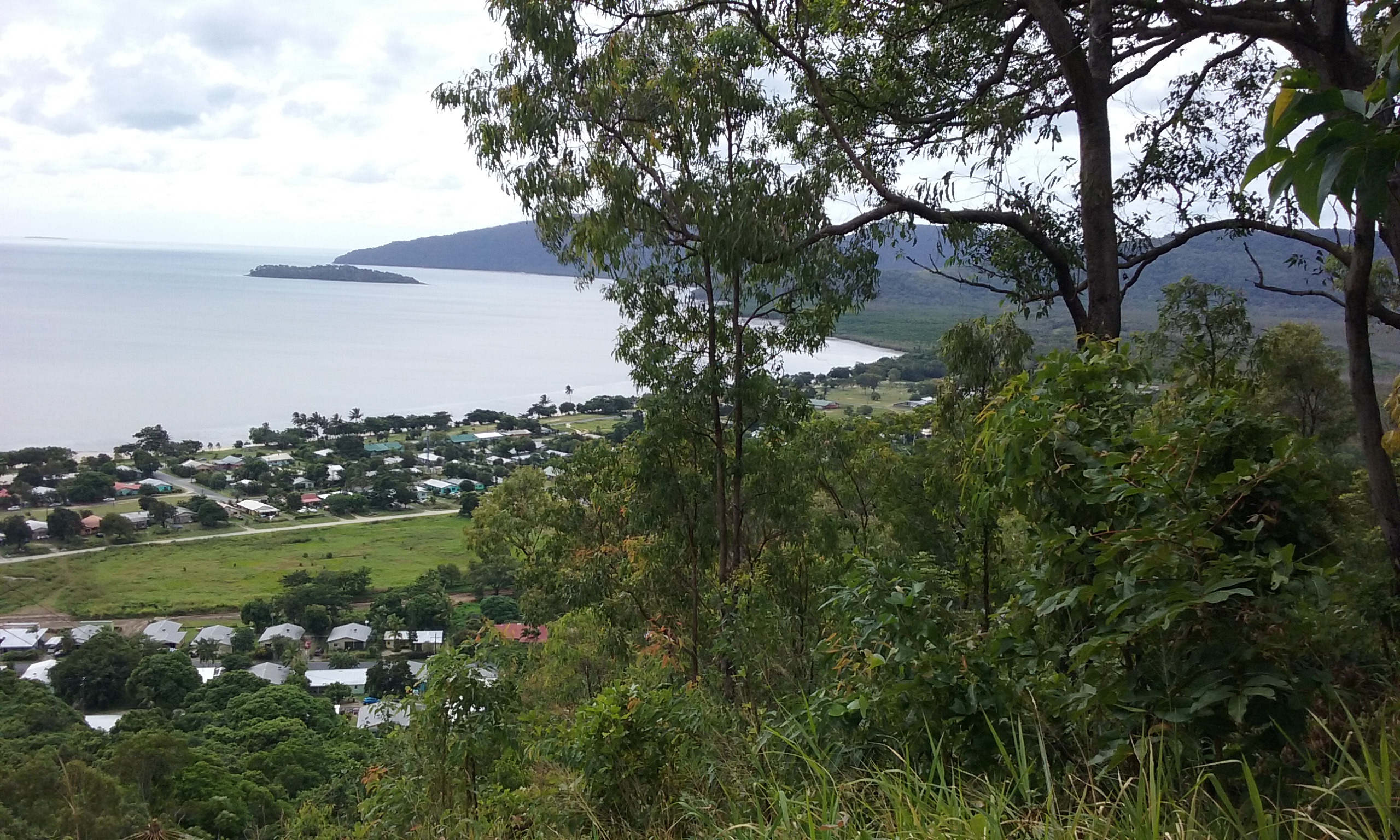
- Town of Yarrabah, 2020

- Interactive map of Yarrabah
- Coordinates: 16.9076°S 145.8674°E
- Country: Australia
- State: Queensland
- LGA: Aboriginal Shire of Yarrabah
- Location: 38.1 km (23.7 mi) NW of Gordonvale; 51.5 km (32.0 mi) E of Cairns CBD; 360 km (220 mi) N of Townsville; 1,692 km (1,051 mi) NNW of Brisbane
- Established: 1892

Government
  - State electorate: Mulgrave
  - Federal division: Kennedy

Area
  - Total: 156.0 km^{2} (60.2 sq mi)

Population
  - Total: 2,505 (2021 census)
  - Density: 16.058/km^{2} (41.589/sq mi)
- Time zone: UTC+10:00 (AEST)
- Postcode: 4871
Localities around Yarrabah
East Trinity	Coral Sea	Coral Sea
Green Hill	Yarrabah	Coral Sea
Aloomba	Deeral	Coral Sea

Yarrabah (traditionally Jarrabah in the Gunggandji language spoken by the indigenous Gunggandji people) is a coastal town and locality in the Aboriginal Shire of Yarrabah, Queensland, Australia. It is an Aboriginal community. In the 2021 census, the locality of Yarrabah had a population of 2,505 people.

The town is home to a creole language known as Yarrabah Creole though it is still considered a dialect of English.

== Geography ==
The town is about 51.5 kilometres (32 mi) by road from Cairns CBD on Cape Grafton. It is 10 kilometres (6.2 mi) by direct-line distance, but is geographically separated from Cairns CBD by the Murray Prior Range and Trinity Inlet, an inlet of the Coral Sea.

== History ==
Gunggay (also known as Gunggandji, Kongandji, Kongkandji, Gungganyji, Idindji and Yidiny) is an Aboriginal language of Far North Queensland. The Gunggay language region of Cape Grafton includes the landscape within the local government boundaries of the Cairns Regional Council and Yarrabah Council.

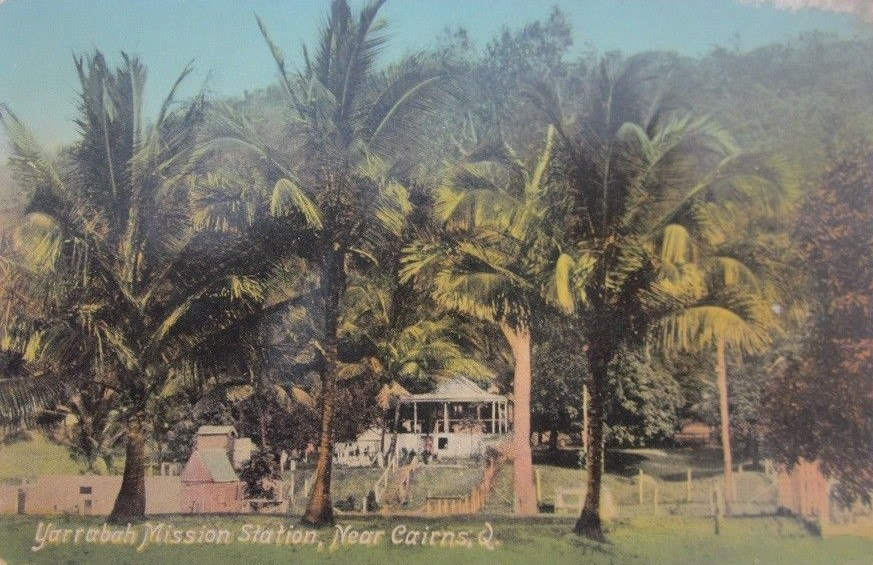
Yarrabah Mission Station, very early 1900s

An Anglican church missionary, Ernest Gribble (1868–1957) in 1892 began to regularly visit an Aboriginal group who inhabited the Yarrabah area living a very traditional lifestyle. These visits by Gribble were to encourage the tribe to move to a mission settlement he was setting up. With the help of the tribe's leader, Menmuny, the tribe moved to the mission now known as Yarrabah Community. The mission was settled in 1893. Over time, many people (including some South Sea Islanders) were relocated from homelands in the surrounding area to Yarrabah.

Yarrabah State School was opened on 1 January 1892. In 2017, Yarrabah State School celebrated its 125th anniversary.

In 1957, the Yarrabah residents staged a strike to protest poor working conditions, inadequate food, health problems and harsh administration. The church expelled the ringleaders and many others left voluntarily, never to return. A few years later, the Government of Queensland assumed control of the mission.

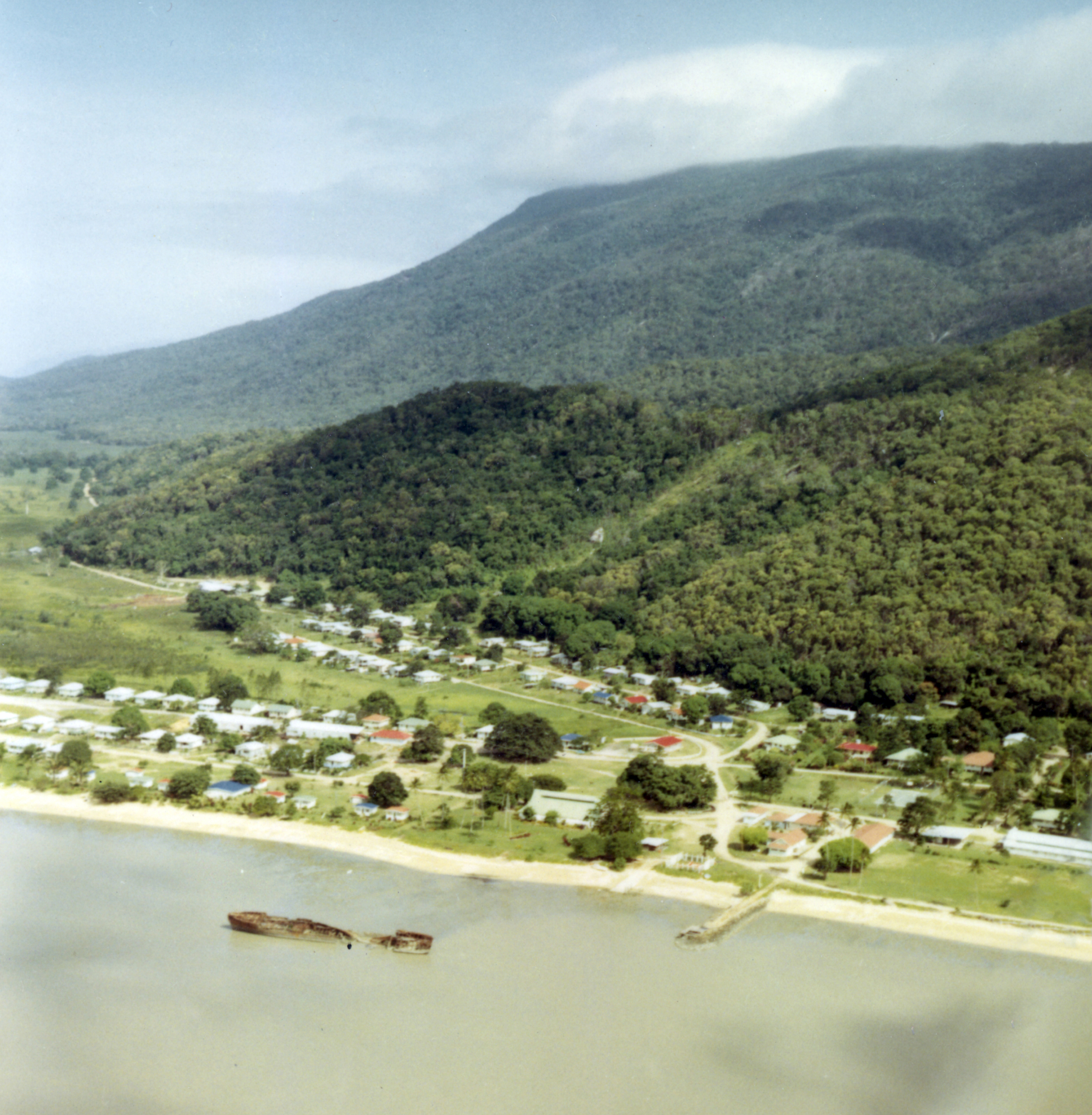
Aerial view of Yarrabah, circa 1972

In 1965, an advisory council was set up which allowed Aboriginal people to give "advice" to the Department of Aboriginal Affairs, but it had no actual power and the government continued to control all aspects of local people's lives. In 1979, several community members joined a union but were stood down.

Eventually, on 27 October 1986, the community received Deed of Grant in Trust land tenure, making it subject to the Community Services (Aborigines) Act 1984, which allowed for self-governing Aboriginal Community Councils with a range of powers and controls over the land. With the passage of reforms in 2005, the Council became an "Aboriginal Shire" and gained the authority of a legal local government.

Following the 2001 Cape York Justice Study findings, Yarrabah became one of many indigenous communities in Queensland to be subject to an alcohol management plan. Restrictions on alcohol possession commenced on 6 February 2004, with a review by 2006. A 2012 survey for another review showed the community was divided on easing restrictions.

In 2002, the first Indigenous Knowledge Centres (IKCs) were developed in partnership with then Aboriginal Community and Island Councils across Queensland, with the State Library of Queensland. The Indigenous Knowledge Centre opened in 2015. The $1.9 million facility was built both for and by the people of Yarrabah, offering learning opportunities even during its construction. Funding for the centre was secured in 2012 by Treasurer and Minister for Aboriginal and Torres Strait Islander Partnerships Curtis Pitt, who officially opened the Yarrabah Knowledge Centre on 19 November. Leeanne Enoch, Minister for Science and Innovation, was also in attendance.

On 23 July 2007, Yarrabah hosted the Cabinet of the Queensland Government in the first ever Cabinet meeting to be held in an indigenous Australian community. On 1 October 2007, the Howard Coalition Government chose Yarrabah as the first recipient of what was said to be a 'landmark housing and welfare reform agreement'.

In 2009 as part of the Local Government Reform Agenda in Queensland, the Council gained recognition as a local government council.

== Demographics ==
The population of community was estimated as 630 indigenous people in 1952.

In the 2016 census, the locality of Yarrabah recorded a population of 2,559 people, but some people may not have been counted due to language barriers and the transient nature of residence at the outstations. Of those recorded, 97.4% identified as Aboriginal or Torres Strait Islander. The median age of Yarrabah residents was 23 years, compared with 38 years nationally. The majority of the Yarrabah workforce was engaged as either labourers or as community and personal service workers, and worked in local government administration or social assistance services. The median individual income was $224 per week. 84.8% of people spoke only English at home. Other languages spoken at home included Kriol at 6.7%. The most common responses for religion were Anglican 84.6% and No Religion 7.4%.

In the 2021 census, the locality of Yarrabah had a population of 2,505 people.

== Education ==
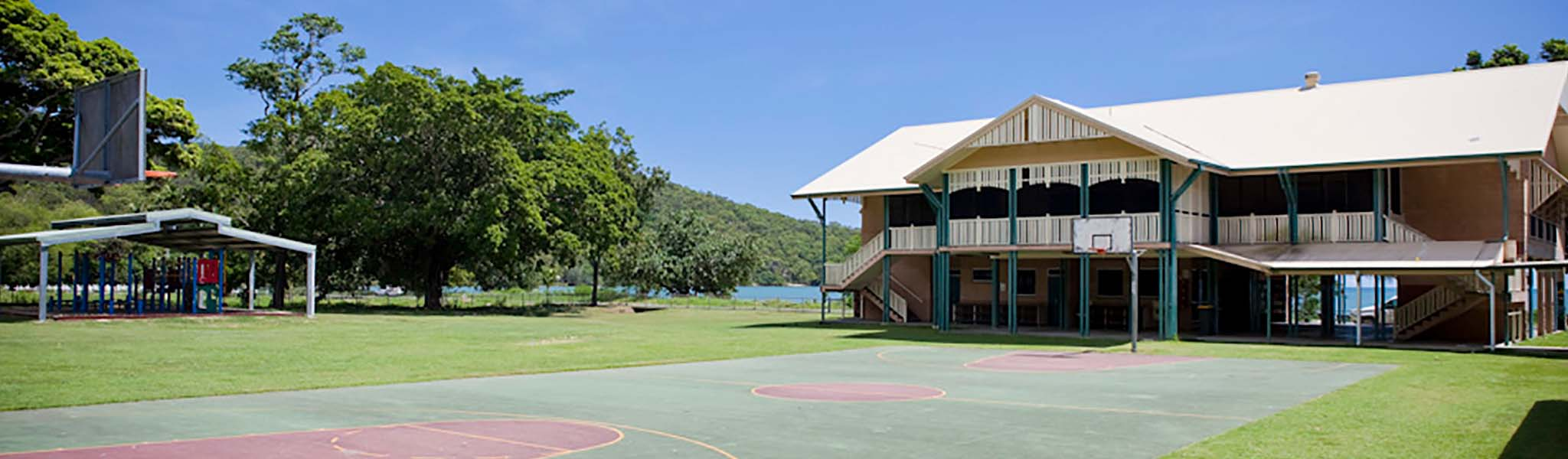
Yarrabah State School, 2023

Yarrabah State School is a government primary and secondary (Early Childhood–10) school for boys and girls. It includes a special education program. In 2018, the school had an enrolment of 443 students with 46 teachers (44 full-time equivalent) and 41 non-teaching staff (29 full-time equivalent). In 2022, the school had 465 students with 43 teachers (41 full-time equivalent) and 54 non-teaching staff (39 full-time equivalent), of whom 29 staff (21 full-time equivalent) are Indigenous.

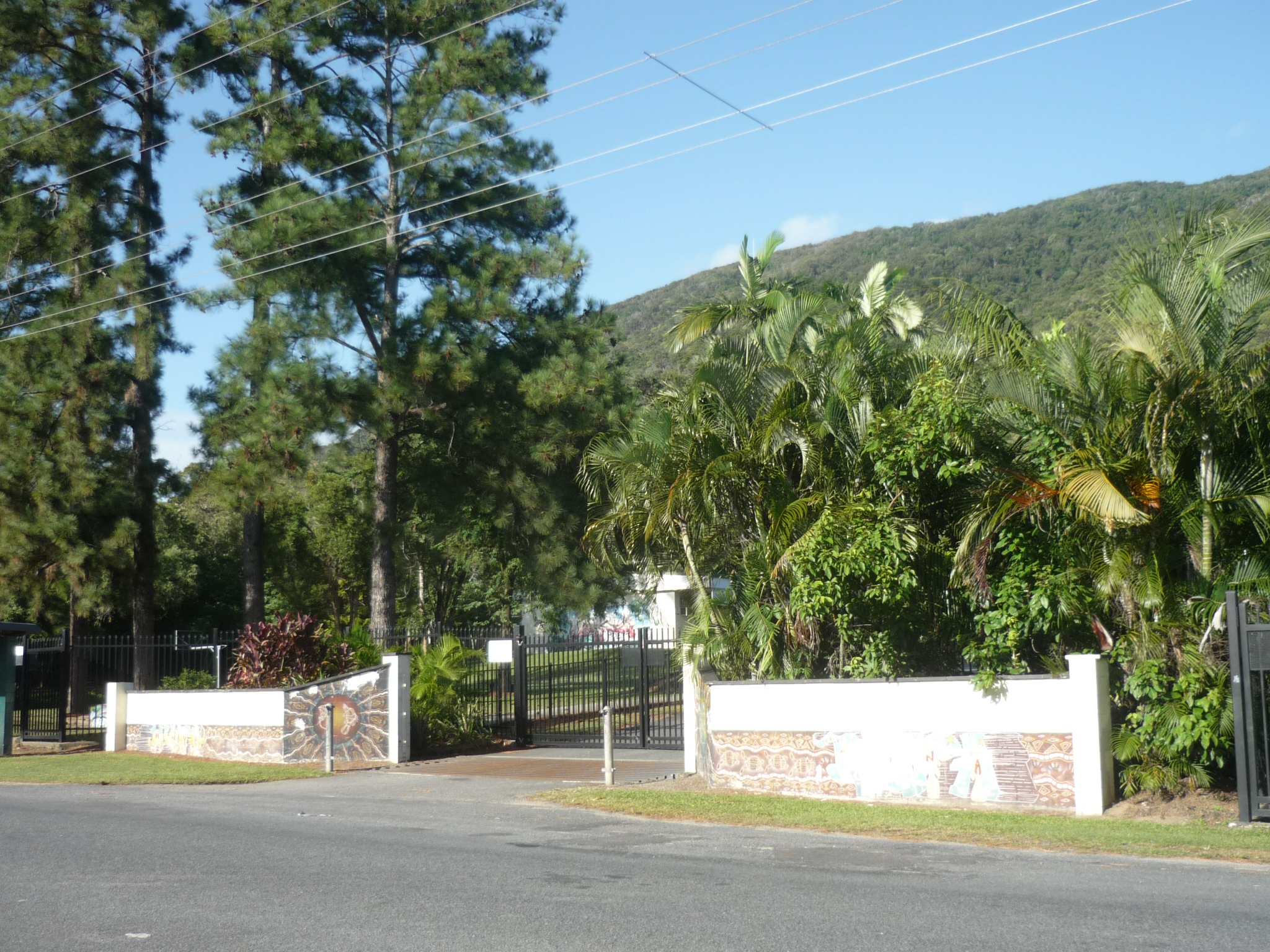
Entrance to the secondary school campus, 2020

The school operates from three sites:

- the Early Childhood and Prep campus at Workshop Street (16.9079°S 145.8683°E)
- the primary school (Years 1–6) campus at Gribble Street (16.9059°S 145.8647°E)
- the secondary campus (Years 7–10) campus at Back Beach Road (16.9288°S 145.8746°E)

The nearest government school for students continuing on to senior years (Year 11–12) is Gordonvale State High School in Gordonvale to the south-west.

== Facilities ==
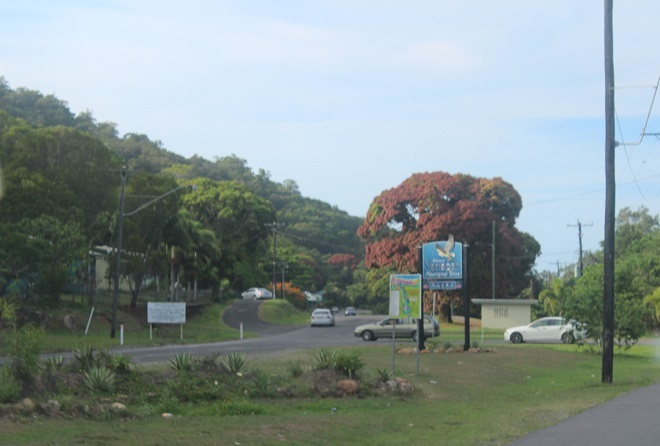
Yarrabah, from Back Beach Road, looking towards 'the mission', a reference to the main settlement.

Yarrabah's medical needs are serviced by a multi-disciplinary primary health care centre, which handles emergencies and general practice care, but does not have inpatient facilities. It is staffed 24 hours a day by staff who mostly commute from Cairns.

There is a police station in the town. Issues of concern include violence, alcohol/substance abuse, domestic violence, and high unemployment. Previously youth suicide was higher than surrounding areas.

== Amenities ==
The township has had a brass band since 1901 to the 1950s, until resurrected in 2013, making their debut at the inaugural Yarrabah Band Festival. The festival itself is now held annually around October, drawing a crowd of about 4000 persons.

Yarrabah Aboriginal Shire Council operates an Indigenous Knowledge Centre (IKC) library service located at Lot 207 Noble Drive which opened in 2015. The $1.9 million facility was built both for and by the people of Yarrabah, offering learning opportunities even during its construction. Funding for the centre was secured in 2012 by Treasurer and Minister for Aboriginal and Torres Strait Islander Partnerships Curtis Pitt, who officially opened the Yarrabah Knowledge Centre on 19 November. Leeanne Enoch, Minister for Science and Innovation, was also in attendance. Yarrabah has a long history of providing a library service to the community. Before the establishment of IKCs, the then-Yarrabah Aboriginal Council operated a Country Lending Service (CLS) as far back as 1984. In 2003, the council asked the State Library of Queensland to transform the CLS into an IKC and lobbied for funds for a new building. The CLS was operational until it suffered irreparable damage during Cyclone Yasi in 2011.

== Attractions ==
The Yarrabah Menmuny Museum, opened in 1996, is in the Jilji suburb. The museum's name comes from the local tribe leader of the late 1800s, Menmuny, who was given the title 'King John' Menmuny, and died circa 1919. A later elder was 'King' Albert Maywee.

== Events ==
The Yarrabah Band Festival is held annually around October, drawing a crowd of about 4,000 people.

== Gallery ==
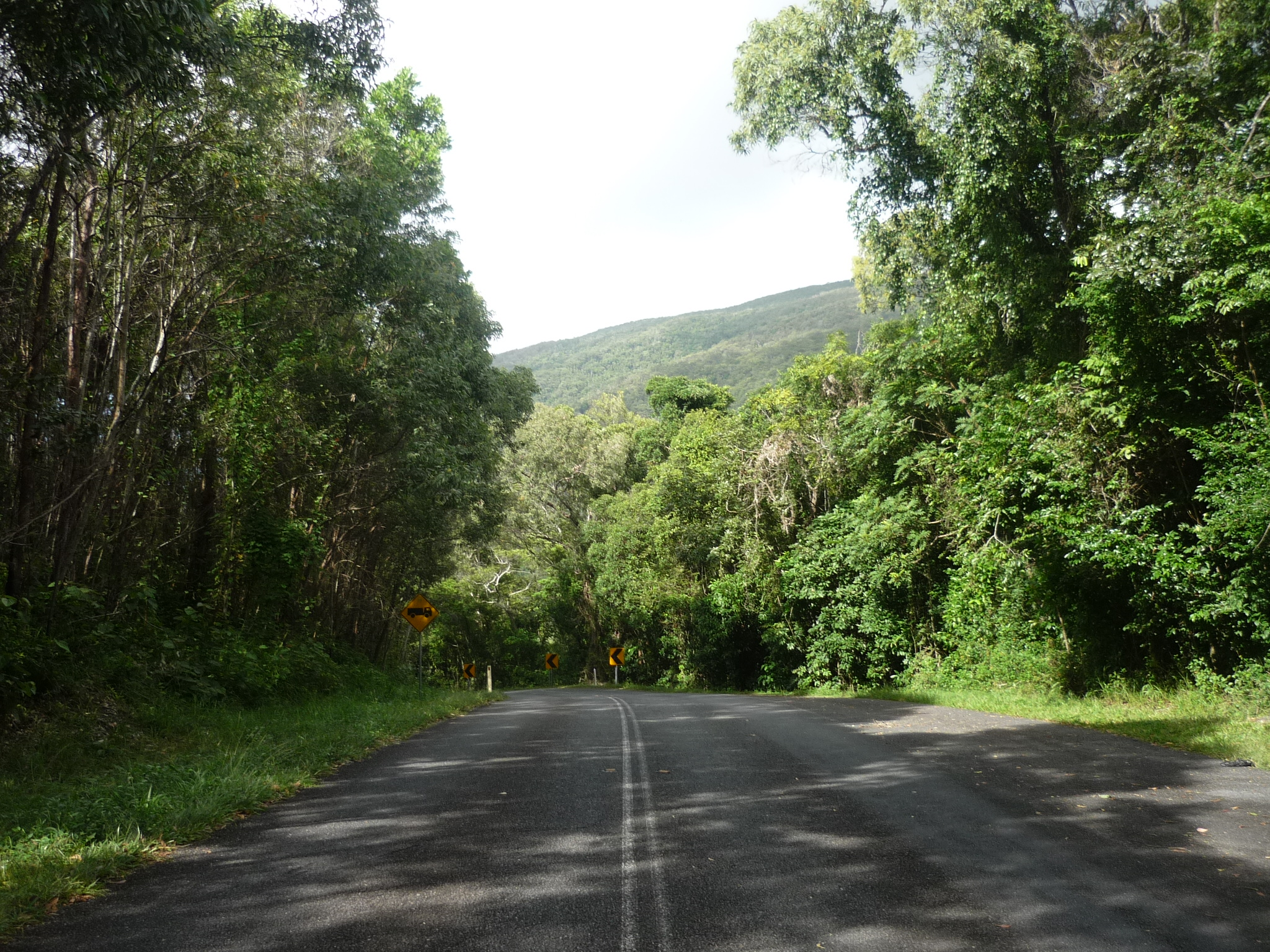
Driving towards Yarrabah township

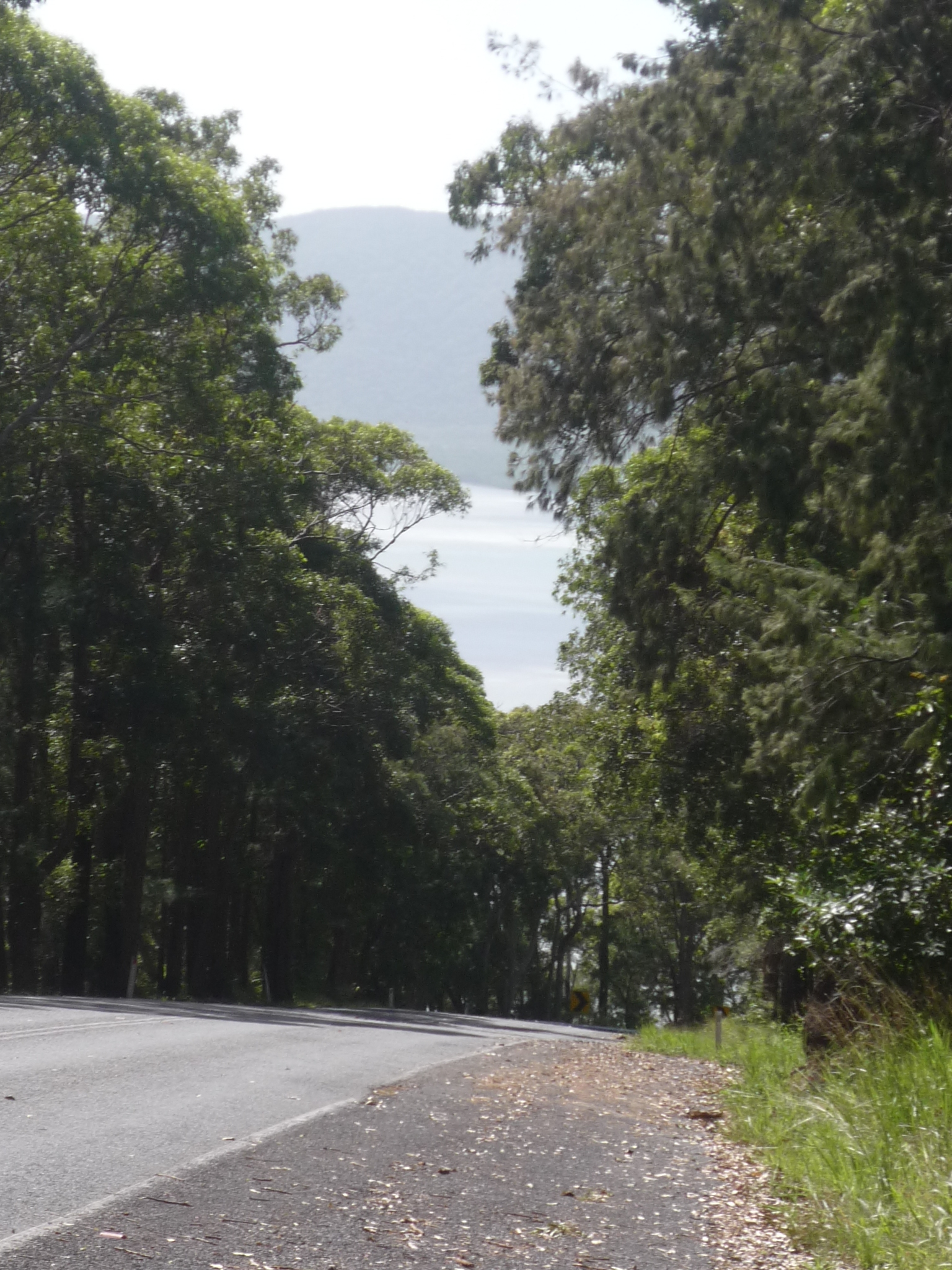
Driving through Trinity Forest Reserve

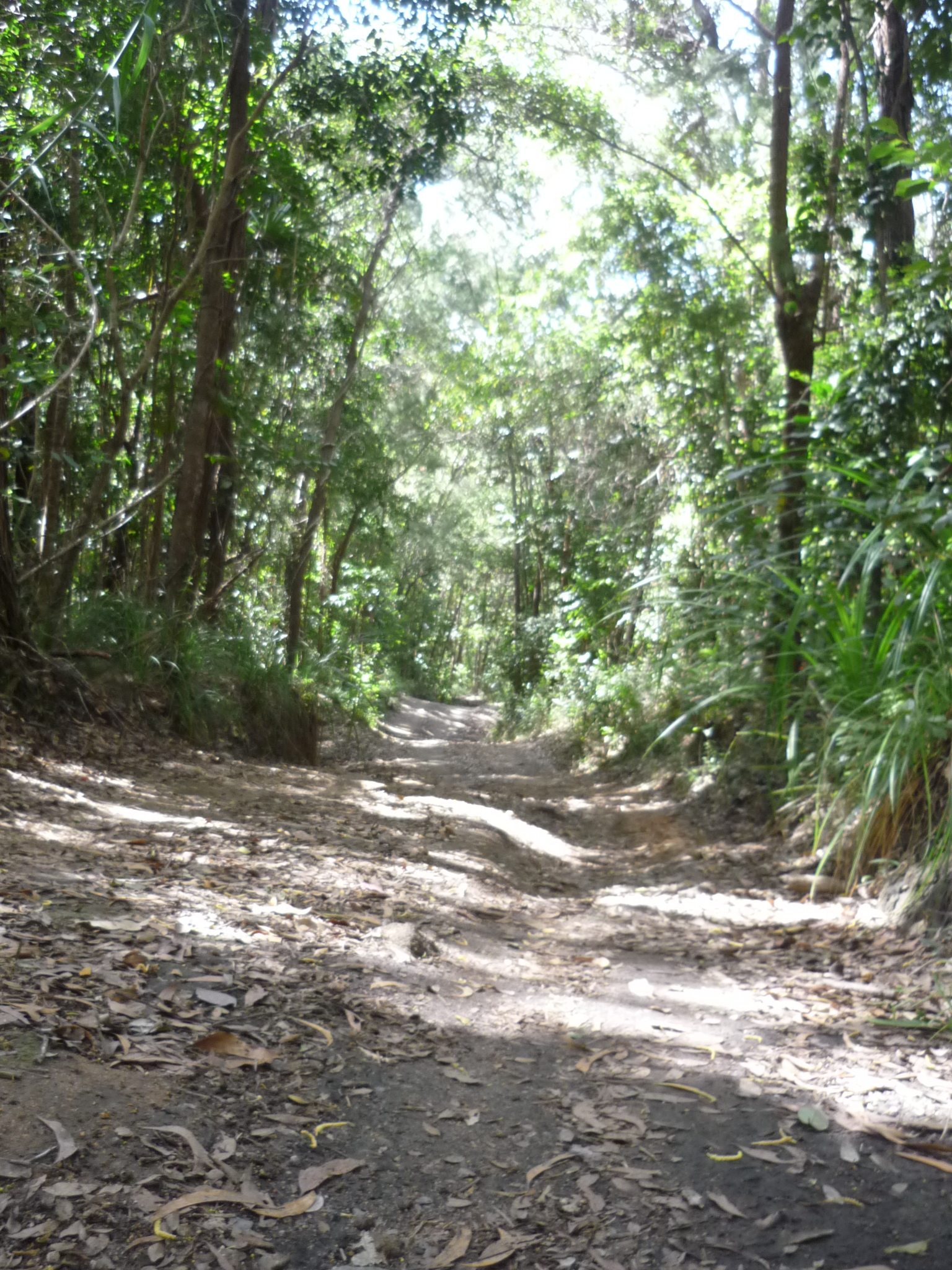
Track to Mount Yarrabah

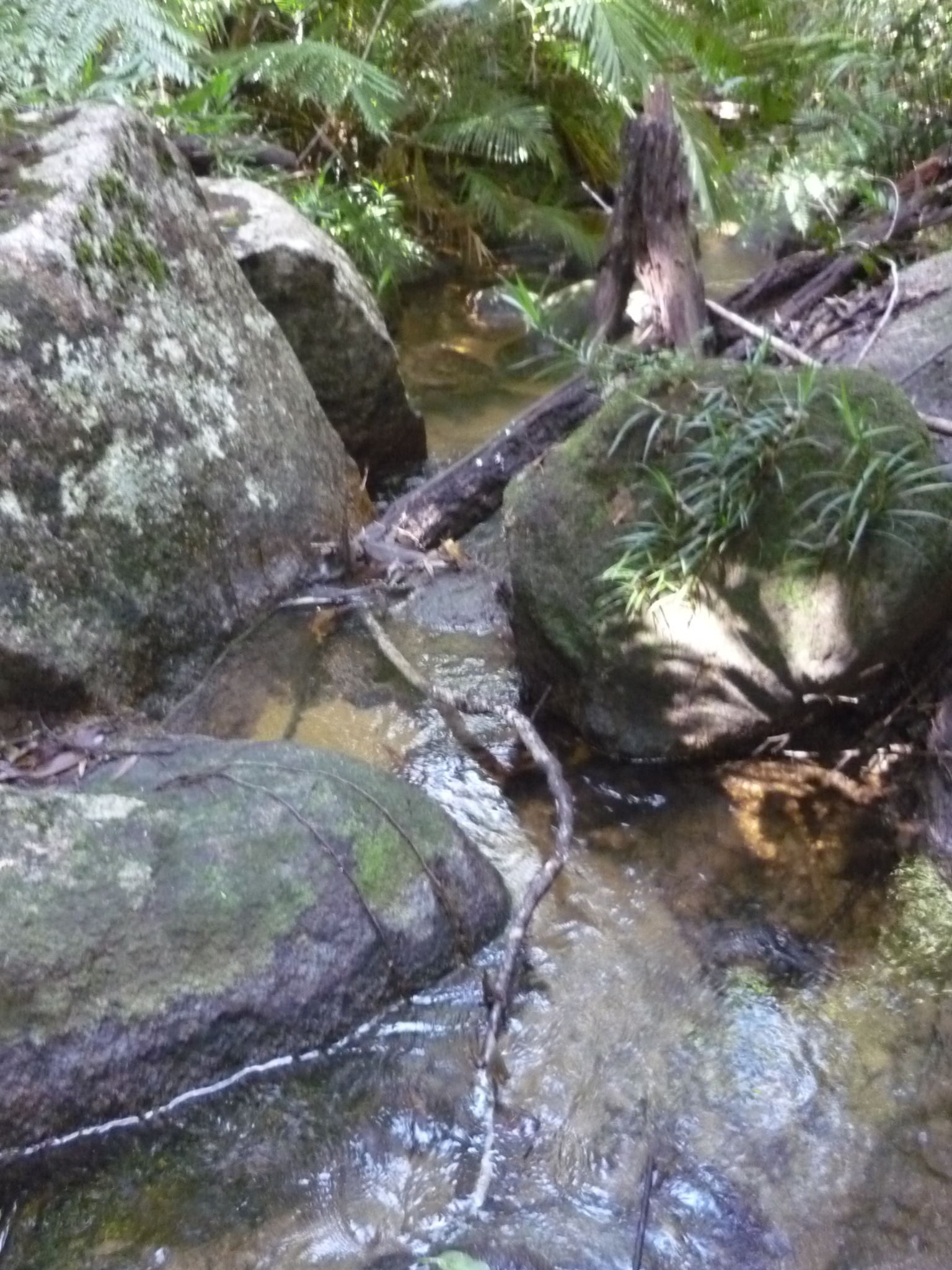
Mountain creek

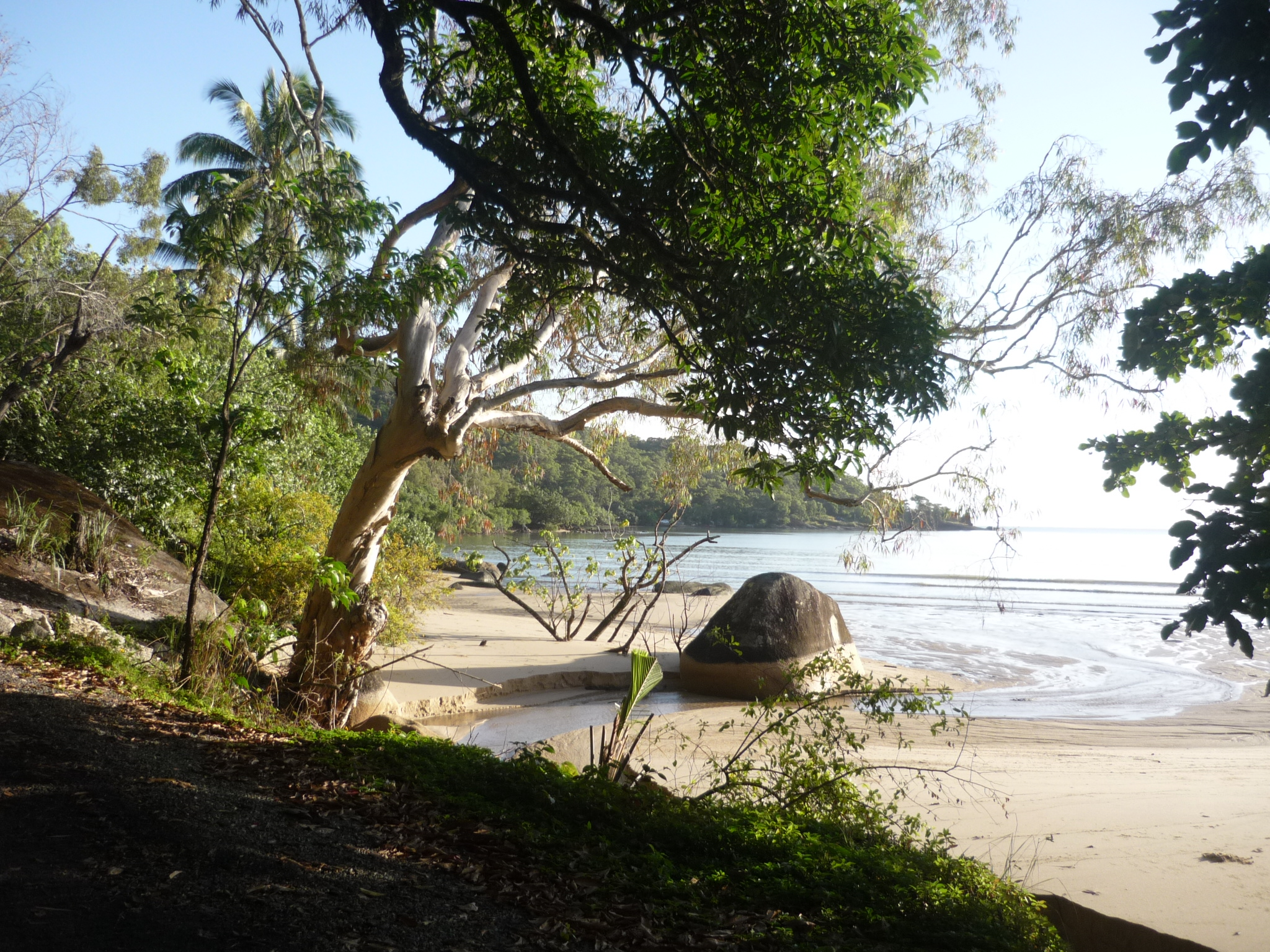
Looking towards the Point Road boat ramp

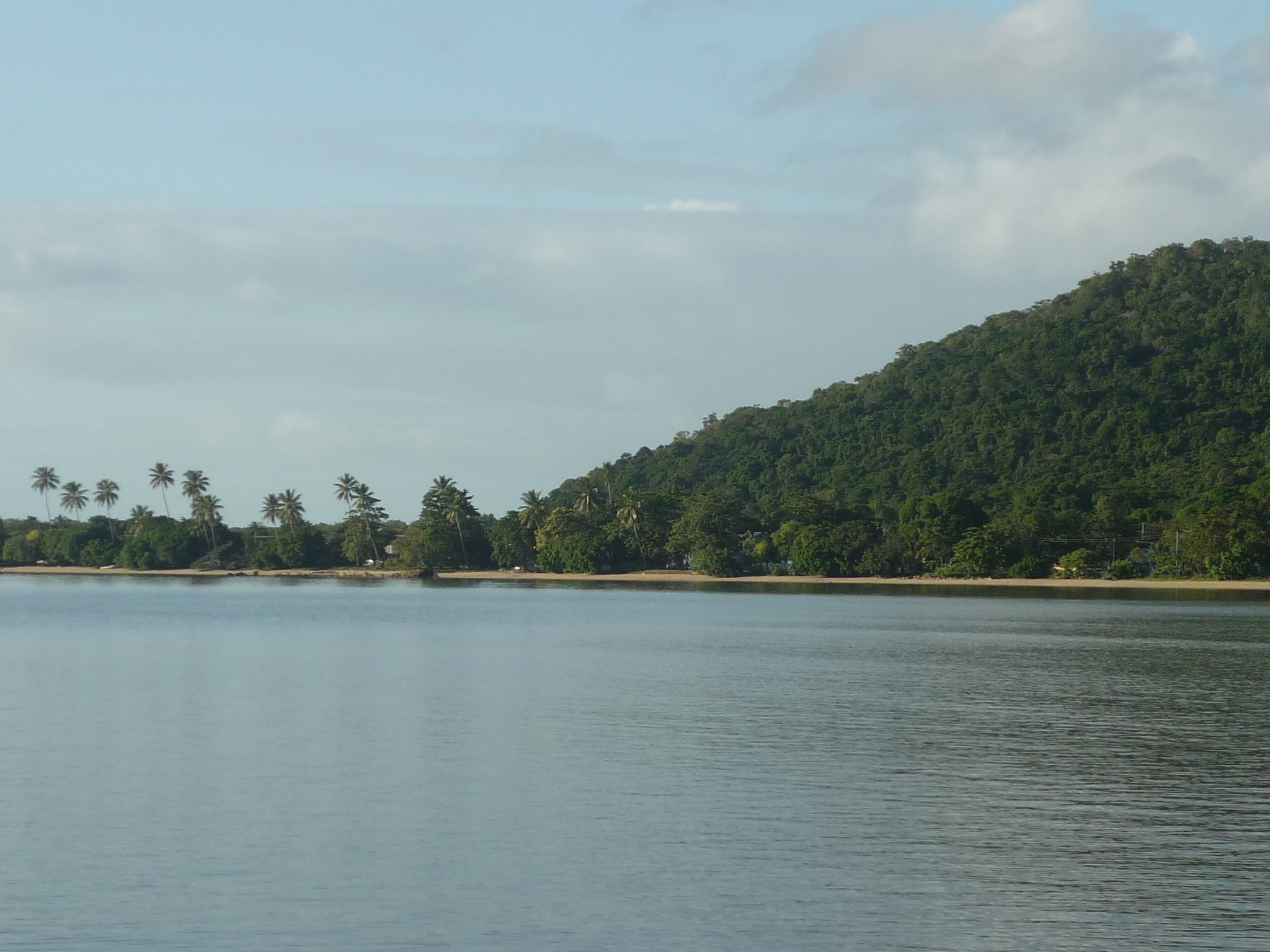
Looking from the boat ramp towards the main township

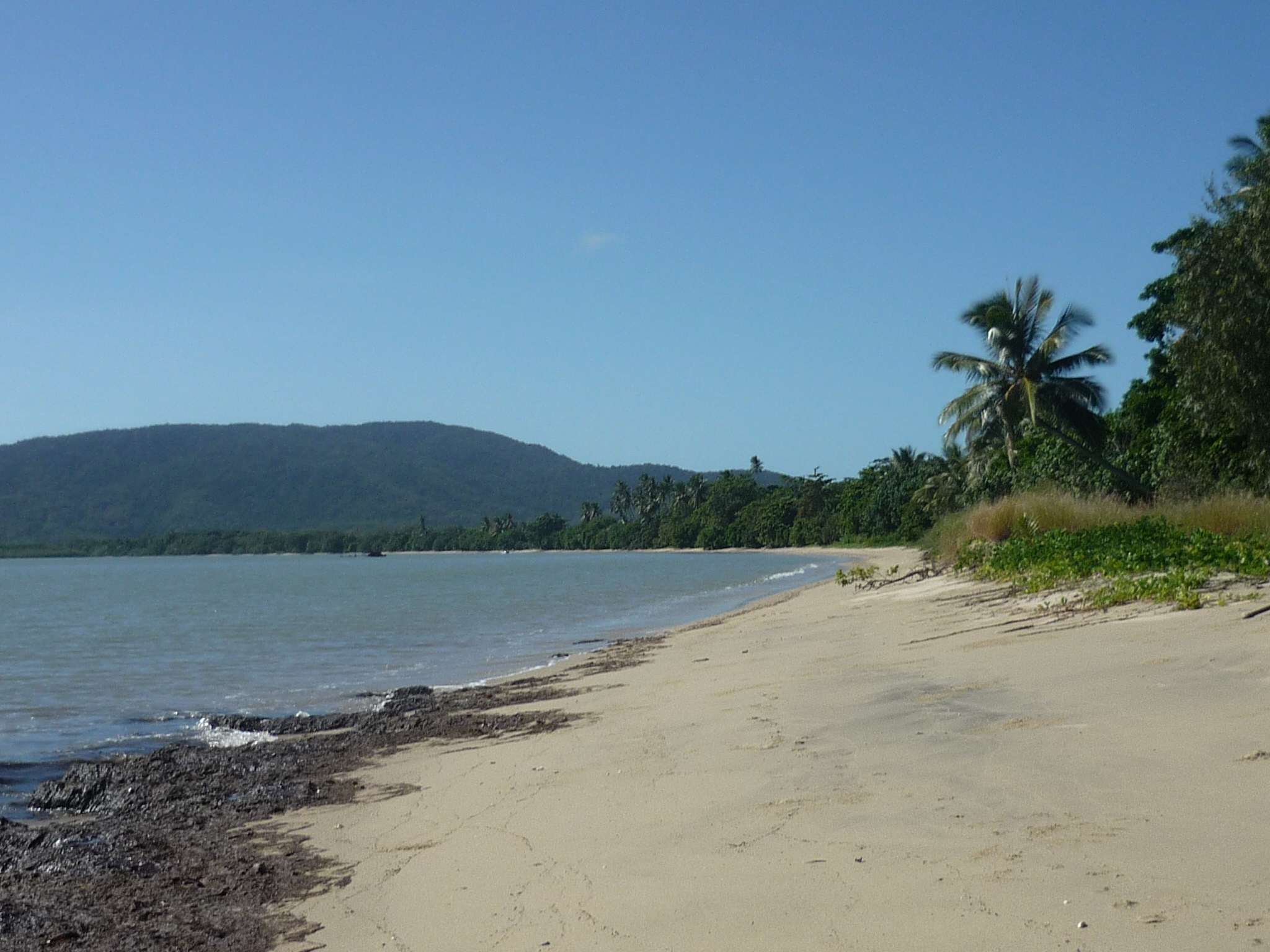
Along the Point Road beach

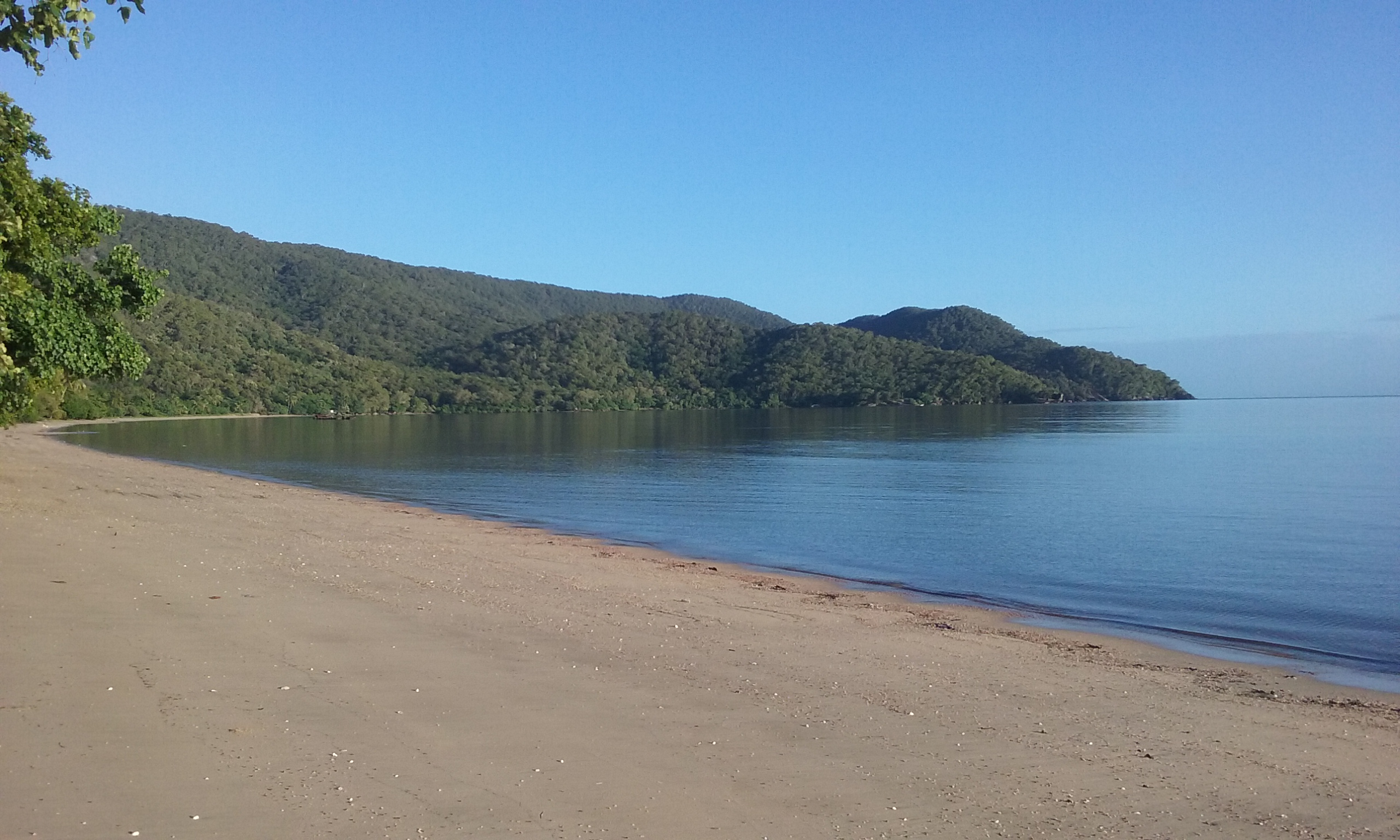
From the main beach towards the boat ramp

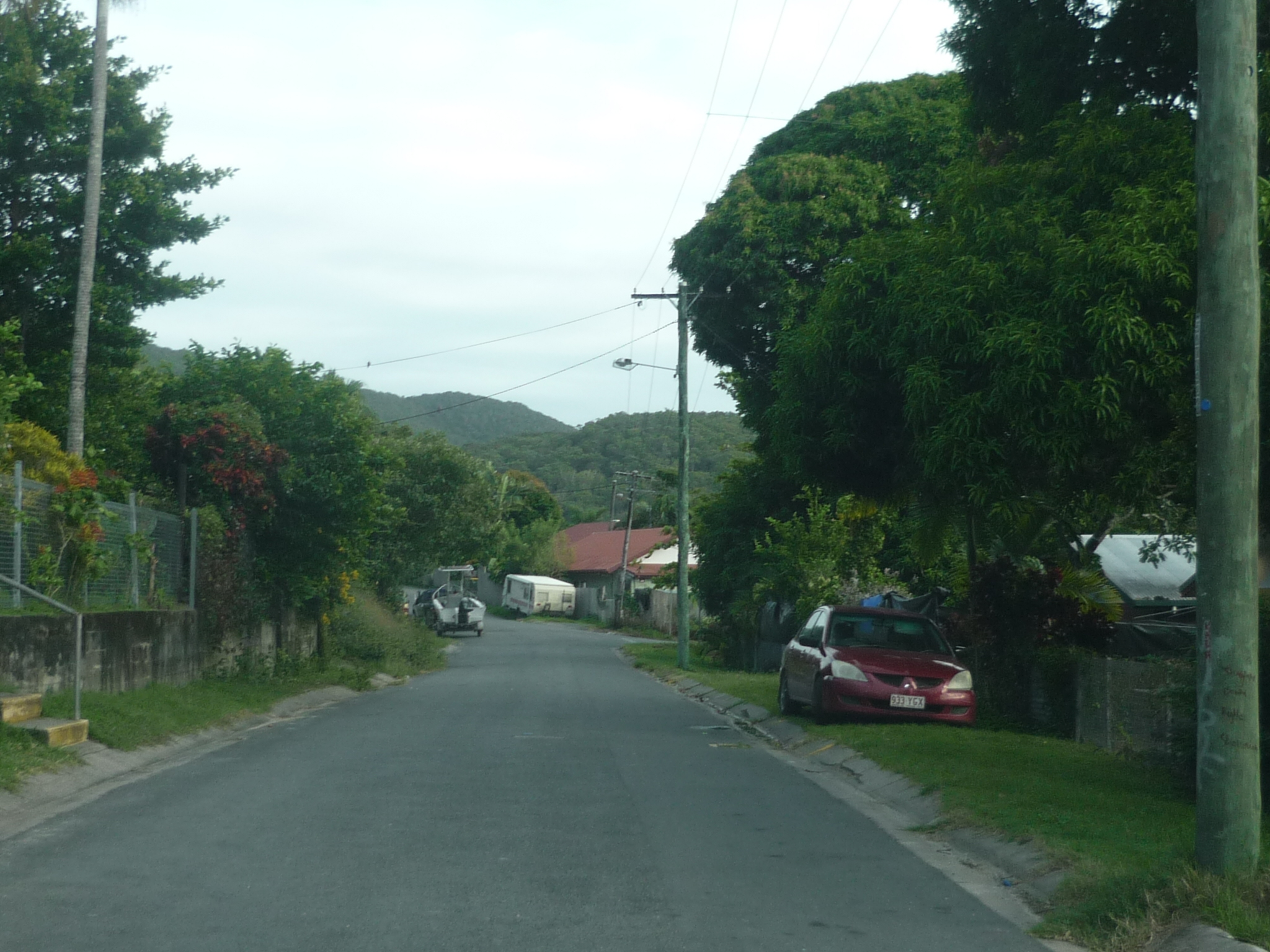
Residential area along Stanley Street

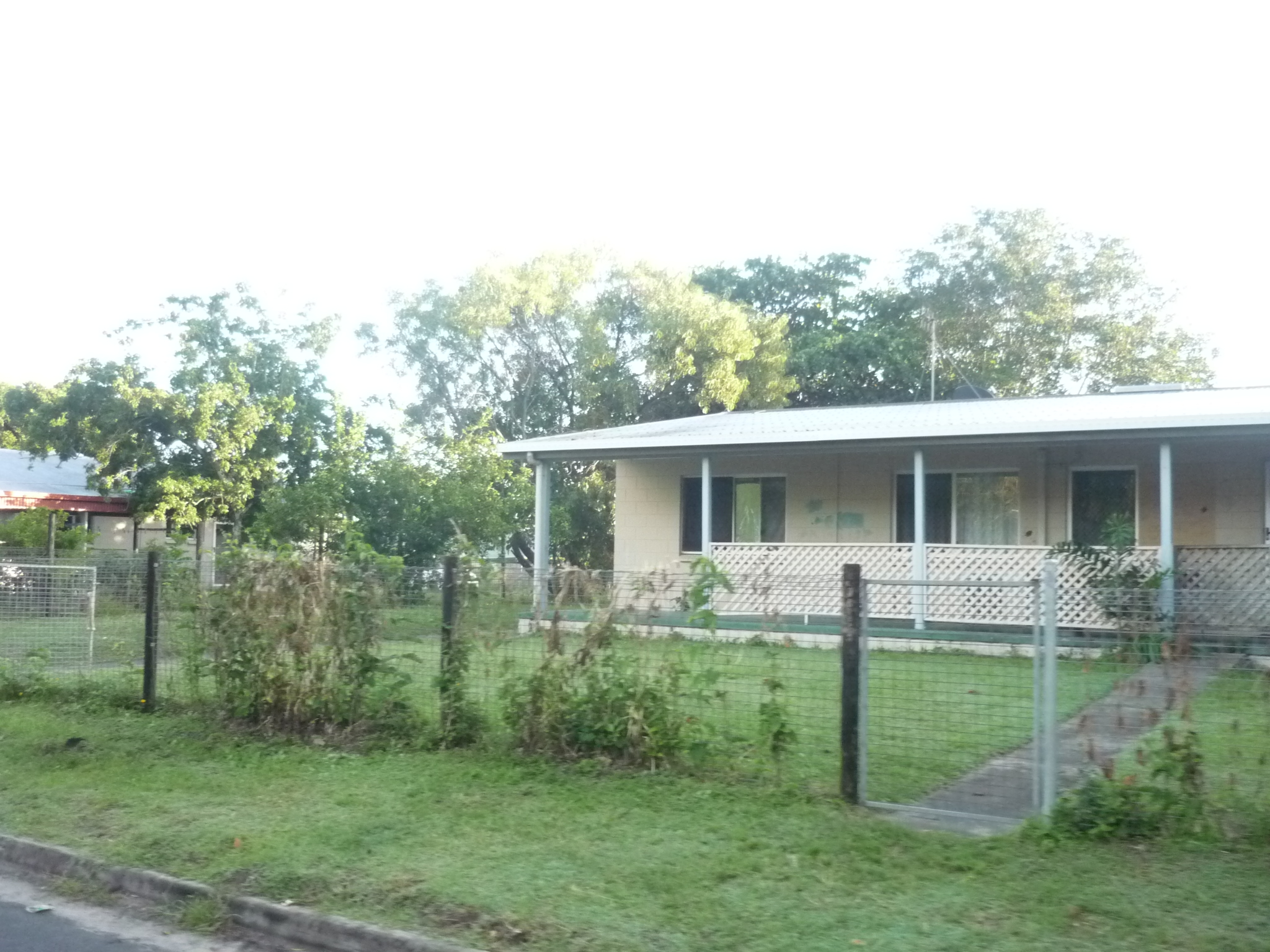
Residential area along Workshop Road

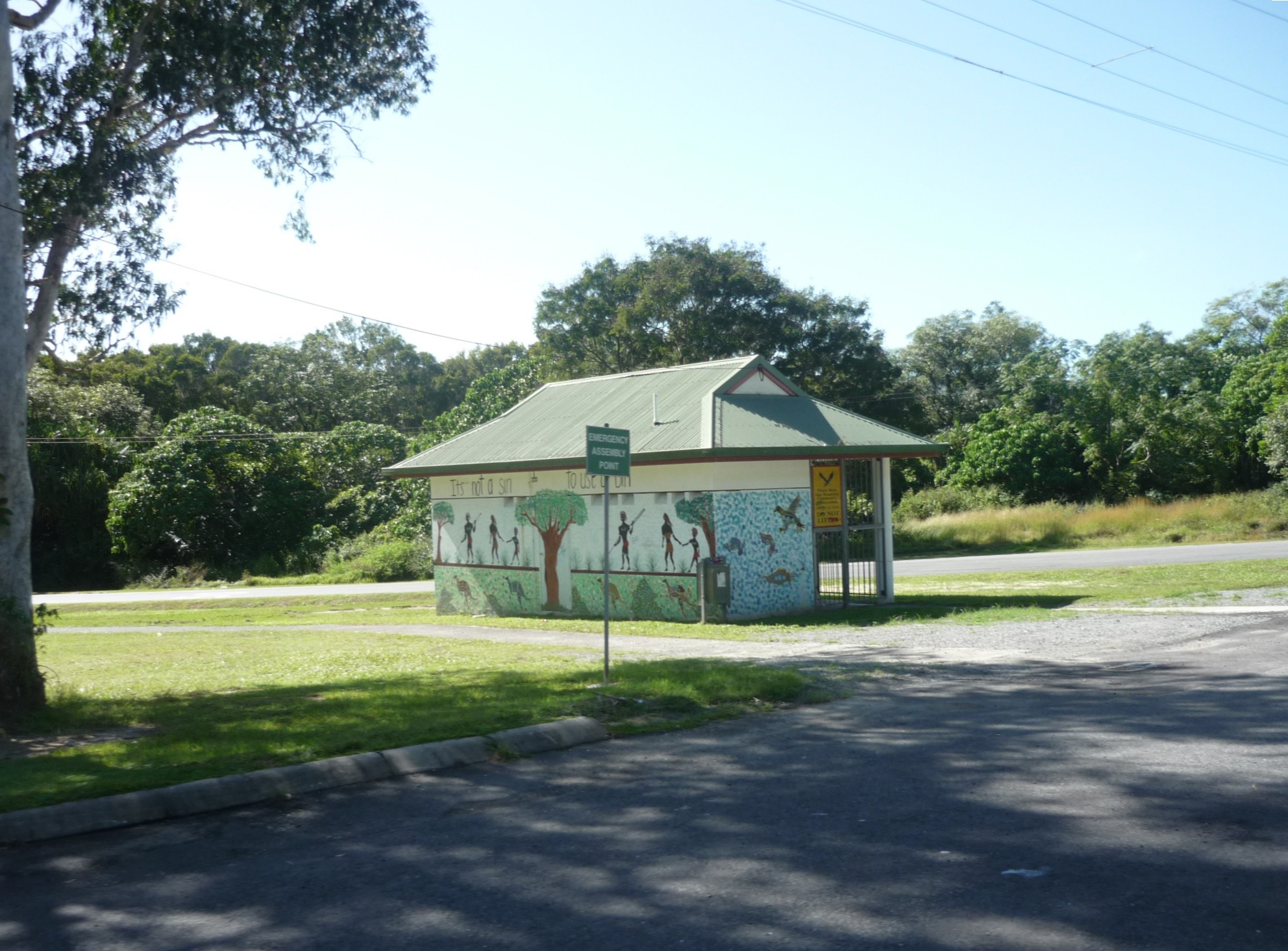
Decorative art on toilet block

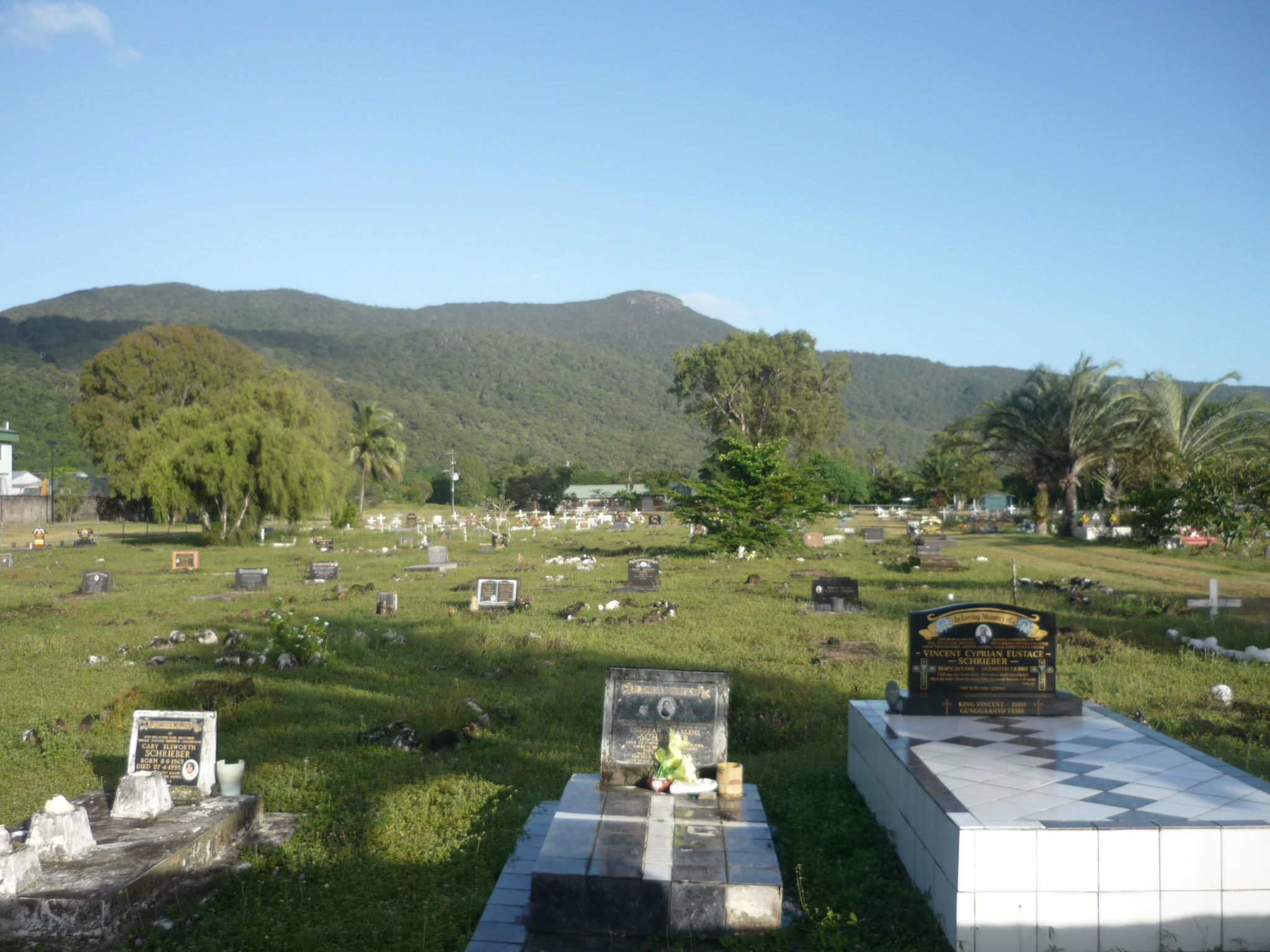
The larger of two town cemeteries

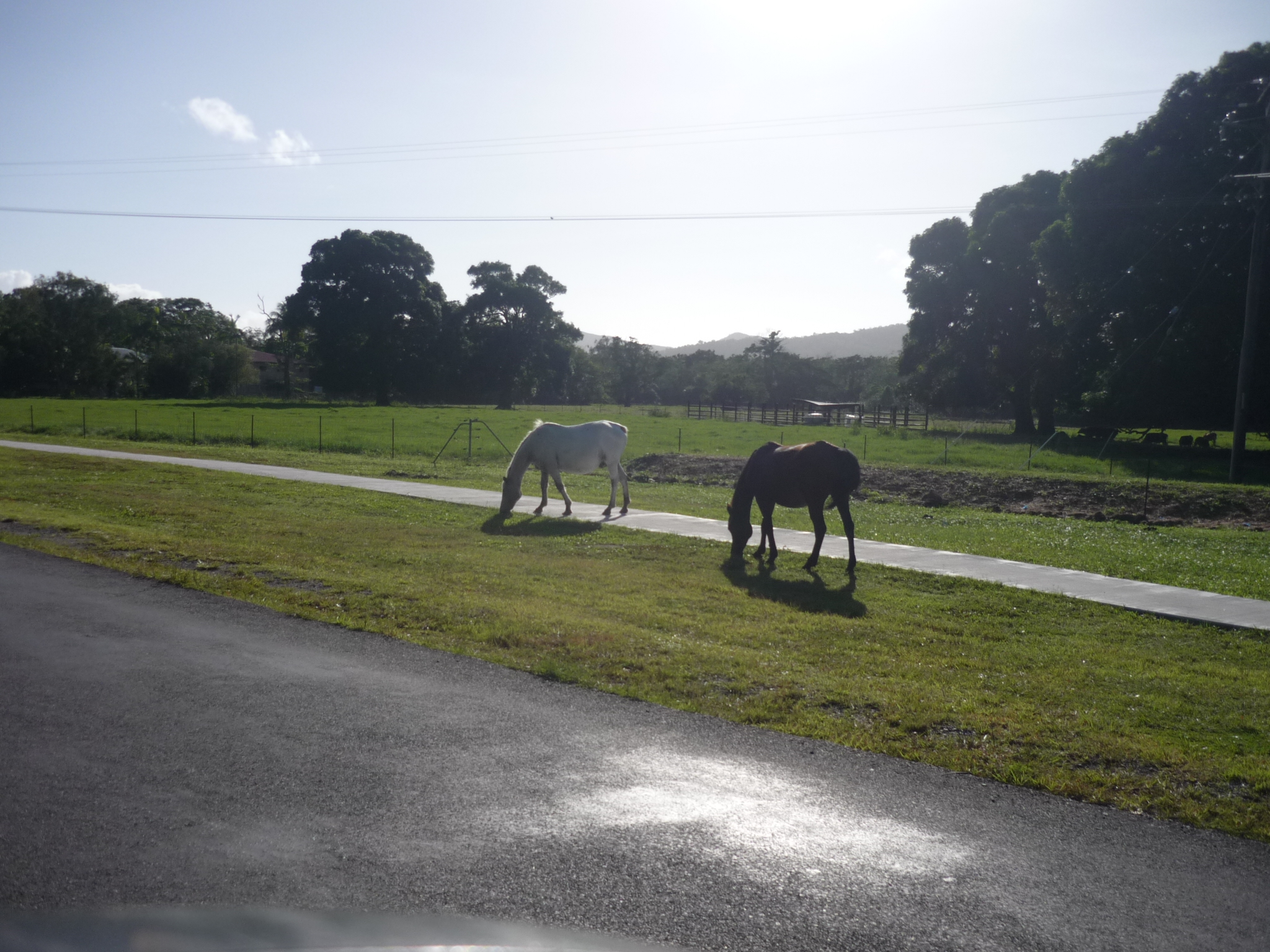
Brumbies grazing on the roadside

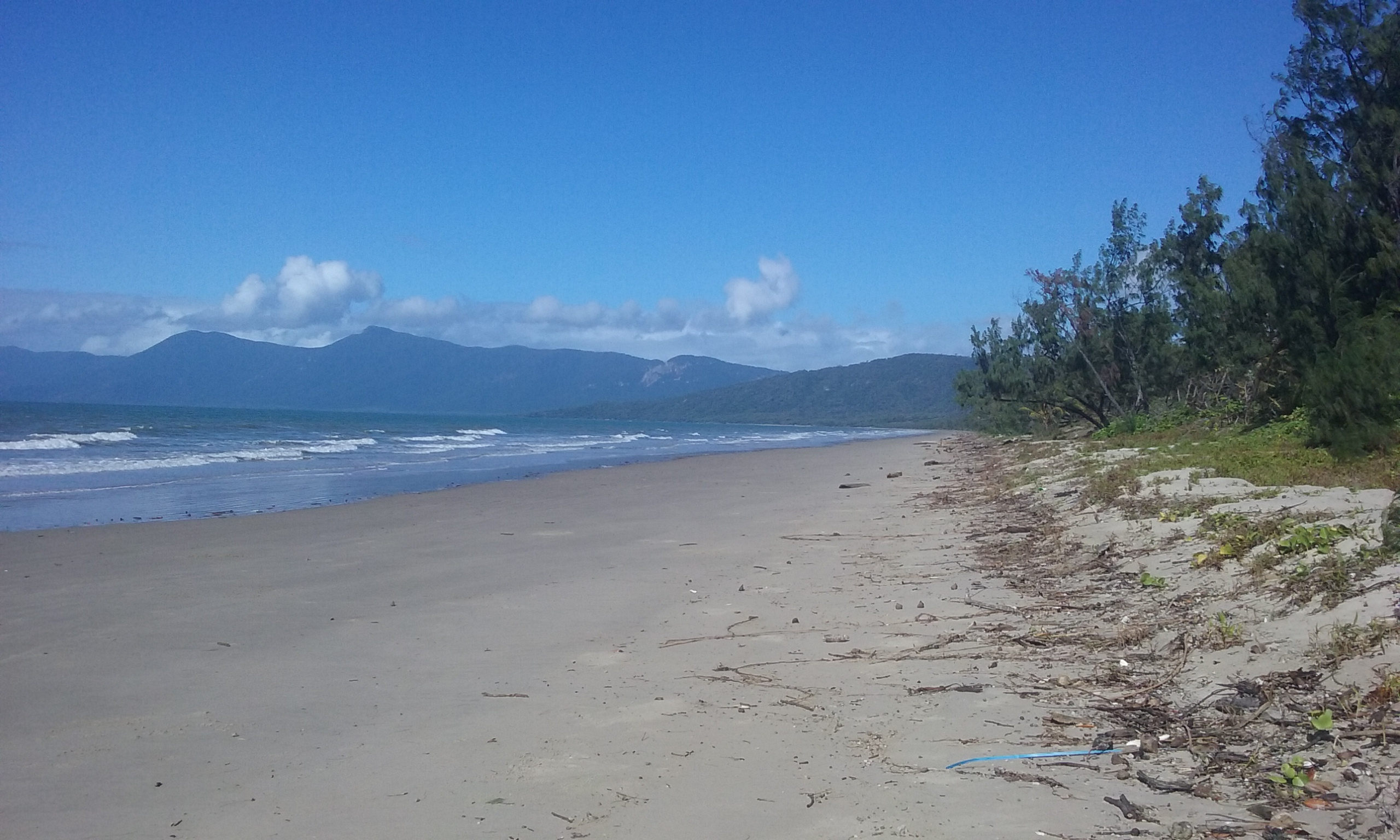
Wungu beach area (Gunggandji country)
