= Hydrographic Survey Bench Mark, East Trinity =

Hydrographic Survey Bench Mark
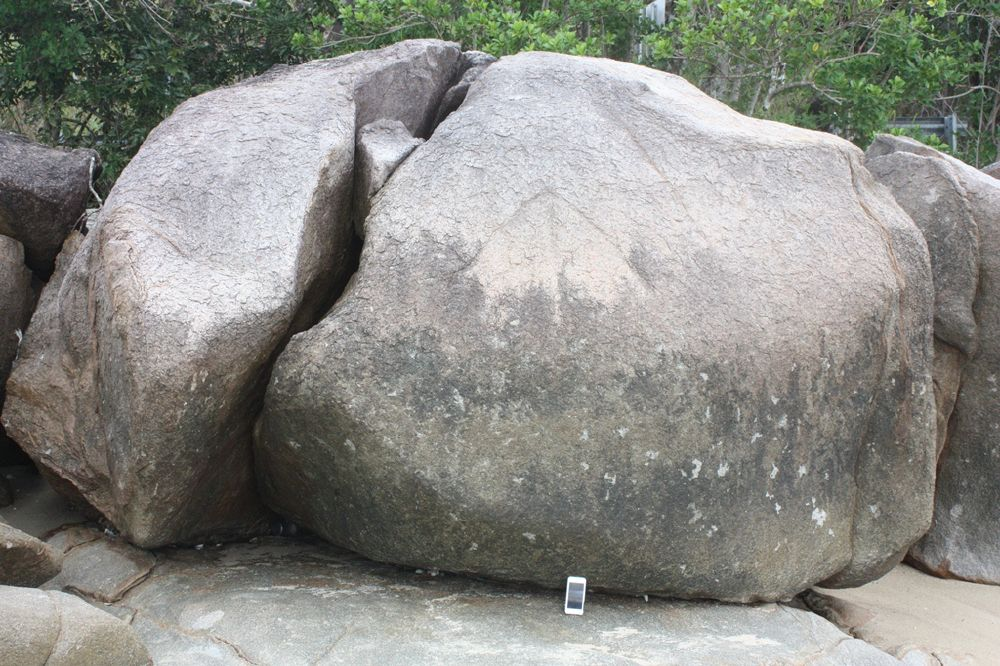
- Hydrographic Survey Bench Mark, East Trinity, 2013 (note mobile phone at base of rock for scale

- Location within Queensland Location within Australia
- 16.9034°S 145.8119°E
- Location: Bessie Point, off Pine Creek-Yarrabah Road, East Trinity, Queensland, Australia

History
- Design period: 1870s - 1890s (late 19th century)
- Built: 1878

Site notes
- Architect: Royal Navy

Queensland Heritage Register
- Official name: Hydrographic Survey Bench Mark, 1878, Bessie Point
- Type: state heritage (built)
- Designated: 9 May 2014
- Reference no.: 602833
- Significant period: 1870s
- Builders: Royal Navy

Hydrographic Survey Bench Mark is a heritage-listed survey marker at Bessie Point, off Pine Creek-Yarrabah Road, East Trinity, Cairns Region, Queensland, Australia. It was designed by Royal Navy and built in 1878 by Royal Navy. It is also known as Bessie Point. It was added to the Queensland Heritage Register on 9 May 2014.

== History ==
A broad arrow bench mark, or datum mark, is chiselled into a large granite boulder on the Rolling Bay (west) side of Bessie Point, located on the east side of Trinity Bay. The arrow was cut in early February 1878 during a hydrographic survey of Cairns Harbour by Navigating Lieutenant Edward Richard Connor, Royal Navy (RN). The bench mark, used to indicate the datum (low water ordinary spring tides) from which the depth of water in the harbour was calculated, is surviving physical evidence of 19th century efforts to survey the Queensland coastline to assist marine navigation, and of the development of Cairns as a port.

When the Hodgkinson goldfield was discovered in 1876, Trinity Bay was chosen as its port - since Cooktown, established in 1873 as the port for the Palmer River goldfield, was too far north. The first settlers arrived in Trinity Bay in October 1876 and Cairns became a port of entry on 1 November 1876. The town of Smithfield, surveyed in late 1876 on the north bank of the Barron River, was an early rival to Cairns, but it was largely abandoned after heavy flood damage in 1877.

The founding of Port Douglas in 1877 almost stifled Cairns, as Port Douglas provided an easier access route to the Hodgkinson. When tin was discovered on the Wild River in 1880, the road from Port Douglas to Herberton was also preferred to the pack tracks from Cairns. However, Cairns salvaged its economy after a heavy wet season in early 1882 closed the road from Port Douglas, resulting in calls for a railway from Herberton to the coast. On 10 September 1884 the government announced Cairns as the preferred terminus for the railway, over rivals Port Douglas and Mourilyan; Cairns' future as the main settlement and port for Far North Queensland was assured.

Although ships delivered freight and passengers to Cairns from October 1876 and the town was surveyed the same year, the harbour was not surveyed for shipping until 1878. Until then, buoys were used to guide ships from the Fairway buoy (marking the channel entrance) through the channel towards Trinity Inlet, with a lantern on shore serving as a leading light at night.

Hydrographic surveying involves mapping the seabed and coastal features to enable safe navigation. It developed as a highly specialized branch of surveying in 19th century Britain. A triangulation network was established over the area to be surveyed, from the mainland to the sea or adjacent islands, with control points on coastal hills or headlands. "Coast liner" parties then conducted a land survey of coastal features; recorded high and low water lines; and took soundings to determine the depth and composition of the seabed.

While the "mother" survey ship would take soundings in deep water, "chicks" (smaller boats, initially rowed and later steam-powered) would run lines of soundings from the shore to deep water, using a lead line. Sounding positions were fixed by reading sextant angles between the three nearest control points, and were then plotted on a field chart. Soundings were taken at all stages of the tide, and were later corrected for the height of the tide to reduce them to a common datum (a quantity or set of quantities that serve as a reference or basis for calculation of other quantities). On completion of a survey, the tides and datum were related to a permanent bench mark for use in future surveys.

A bench mark is a point, at a known elevation above or below an adopted datum, marked on a durable object. Bench marks such as an upward-pointing broad arrow symbol (used to denote a government survey from 1852) could be chiselled on a rock - as was the case at Bessie Point. Alternatively, metal disks could be attached to a rock, or to a concrete block. Often a horizontal line was cut, balanced on the point of the arrow, although only an arrow was cut at Bessie Point. Other examples of broad arrow bench marks cut into rocks exist at Bowen (1887), and at Princess Charlotte Bay in the Flinders group of islands (1899, by HMS Dart). In the case of the Bessie Point 1878 bench mark, which is cut into the largest boulder on the shoreline, the datum was low water ordinary spring tides, calculated as being 12 feet (3.7 m) below the broad arrow. All water depths (in feet) on the map of Cairns Harbour made in 1878 thus represented the depth available at low water ordinary spring tides, that water level being 12 feet (3.7 m) below the bench mark. The tidal range for spring tides in the bay was 8–10 feet (2.4–3.0 m).

The survey of Cairns Harbour in 1878 was part of an ongoing process of surveying the Queensland coastline and its harbours and rivers. In 1770 Captain James Cook in HM Bark Endeavour was the first British navigator to chart the coast of what is now Queensland, and he visited and named Trinity Bay. Admiralty surveys commenced after the establishment of the British Admiralty Hydrographic Office in 1795. Queensland's waters were charted and surveyed by navigators including Matthew Flinders (1799 in the schooner Norfolk; 1802 in HMS Investigator; Lieutenant Charles Jeffreys (1816–17 in HM Brig Kangaroo); Lieutenant Phillip Parker King (1819–21, HM Cutter Mermaid and HMS Bathurst); Lieutenant John Oxley (1823, HM Cutter Mermaid); Captain Henry J Rous (1827, HMS Rainbow); John Clements Wickham (1839, HMS Beagle); John Lort Stokes (1841, HMS Beagle); Captain FP Blackwood and Lieutenant CB Yule (1843–45, HMS Fly and HM Cutter Bramble); Captain Owen Stanley (1847–48, HMS Rattlesnake); and Captain HM Denham (1858–61, HMS Herald).

After Queensland's separation from New South Wales in 1859, more accurate charts were required as the new colony developed its ports. Coastal shipping was of vital importance to Queensland's economy prior to World War II, given the size of the state, the lack of all-weather roads, and delays in completing the coastal rail link from Brisbane to Cairns. In 1860–61 Queensland entered into an agreement with the British Admiralty to split the annual costs of hydrographic surveying (then about £3000 per annum). The Admiralty would provide staff and instruments and publish charts, while the Queensland Government would provide the lodging, subsistence and "means of locomotion" for staff. The focus was on charting a safe shipping route along the Queensland coast, but the Admiralty surveyors could also assist the Queensland Government with its river and harbour surveys. In 1861 Lieutenant (later Commander) George Poynter Heath, RN, was appointed as marine surveyor to Queensland's Surveyor-General's Department, and in his first year he surveyed the Maroochy and Mooloolah rivers in Spitfire. In 1862 he was appointed Portmaster and Marine Surveyor of Queensland.

That same year Master James Jeffery was appointed as Queensland's first Admiralty Surveyor. He hired a local vessel to survey the Great Sandy Strait, Hervey Bay, and the mouth of the Mary River, but soon persuaded the Queensland Government to have a surveying schooner constructed. HMS Pearl, a 60-foot-6-inch (18.44 m) vessel built in Sydney by Mr Chowne of Pyrmont, came into service in October 1863. It was later lengthened by 4.27 metres (14.0 ft) in 1868. HMS Pearl was rigged as a fore and aft schooner, was of 70 ton burden with a light draught (for use in shallow waters), and left Brisbane to complete a survey of Hervey Bay in late October 1863. Between 1864 and 1866 Jeffery surveyed Moreton Bay, Keppel Bay, and the outer route to Point Danger.

Jeffery was replaced in 1866 by Master (Staff-Commander from 1870) Edward Parker Bedwell, who had joined the RN in the late 1840s and the surveying service in 1857. Bedwell was posted to Australia as chief assistant to the NSW hydrographic survey in 1864, later taking charge of the Queensland survey. Bedwell continued the survey of Moreton Bay until the beginning of 1868; and from then to 1879 he surveyed the coast between Danger Point and the north end of the Cumberland Islands (near Mackay); the Brisbane, Mary, Burnett and Fitzroy Rivers to their principal townships; plus Port Curtis and Bowen. The coastal survey from Capes Townshend and Palmerston to the Percy Islands (between Rockhampton and Mackay) took four years. Bedwell was assisted by Navigating Lieutenant EHS Bray from 1867 to 1870; Navigating Sub-Lieutenant (Navigating Lieutenant from 1872) Edward Richard Connor from HMS Clio from late 1870 to the end of 1878; and Navigating Lieutenant Haslewood for part of 1879. Navigating Sub-Lieutenant A Leeper also assisted from November 1877.

Edward Connor joined the RN in 1861 as a Master's Assistant. From 1864 he was in the hydrographic service, working in the Mediterranean, the English Channel, the Straits of Magellan, and Queensland waters. Connor served on HMS Nassau from 1866 to 1869, and was severely wounded in an engagement with the indigenous people of Tierra del Fuego in 1867. After leaving the Admiralty survey at the end of 1878, Connor appears to have returned to England c.1880 and he also spent two years with the Royal Chartered British North Borneo Company, in command of the Governor's armed yacht, before returning to Australia in the mid-1880s, where he joined the NSW Naval Brigade as a lieutenant. In August 1900, as a commander, he was sent to China during the Boxer Rebellion, in command of the NSW Naval Brigade. He was appointed Companion of the Order of St Michael and St George (CMG), gazetted 25 July 1901, retired as a Captain in 1902 and died at home in Sydney on 2 January 1903, aged 56.

In January 1878 Connor traveled from Brisbane to Cairns on SS Victoria, arriving the evening of 31 January. He commenced work the next day (what vessel he used is not detailed), completing the survey of Cairns Harbour in fine weather by 9 February. He then traveled to survey Port Douglas on SS Dugong, and returned to Brisbane on SS Elamang on 22 February. He reported to the Colonial Treasurer, in a letter dated 24 March 1878, that Cairns Harbour, at the extreme south end of Trinity Bay, had an anchorage sheltered from "east by south to west". Three channels existed from the anchorage into the port, the east channel being the most direct, and at least 6 inches (150 mm) deeper than the other two. He noted that the "shoalest" water of 7 feet 6 inches (2.29 m) at low water springs was found from one to two miles inside the Fairway buoy. The water then deepened gradually until there was over 30 feet (9.1 m) just off the wharves (on the west side of the mouth of Trinity Inlet). He added that he had left well defined datum marks at both Cairns and Port Douglas. His report included a map of Cairns Harbour, scaled at 4 inches (100 mm) to the nautical mile, which indicated soundings in feet, reduced to low water ordinary spring tides. The datum mark at Bessie Point was indicated on the map as being "12 feet above low water ordinary Sp[ring tides]", and near the map's title it was stated that the datum mark was "on top of the largest boulder on Bessie Point".

Although Trinity Inlet provided a safe harbour, continuous dredging of a channel through the bar was required for larger vessels to reach the inlet, and the depths required were calculated from the datum indicated by the bench mark at Bessie Point. For example, in 1890 the bar was dredged to provide 13 feet (4.0 m) depth of water in a 200-foot-wide (61 m) channel at low water ordinary spring tides, but by 1894 part of the channel had re-silted to a depth of 8 feet 6 inches (2.59 m). Later the bar cutting was dredged to 15 feet (4.6 m) in 1902, only to re-silt to 12 feet (3.7 m) by 1905. The Cairns Harbour Board took over the port in 1906, and concrete wharves were commenced in 1910. By 1915 a 19 feet (5.8 m) deep entrance channel had been dredged, and the bar cutting was 5.5 miles (8.9 km) long. The spoil from dredging was used for land reclamation on shore.

As well as surveying Cairns harbour in 1878, and accompanying Bedwell on his missions, Connor also spent time surveying the coast of New Guinea, the Brisbane River and Cook Harbour (1873), and the Gulf of Carpentaria (1875). In 1877, while surveying Broadsound in command of HMS Pearl, Connor had a severe attack of "acute rheumatism", and had to be let off at Mackay.

During Connor's time with the Queensland survey the 39-foot (12 m) steam launch Sabina was built in 1872 to assist HMS Pearl, and in 1878 the 195-ton screw steamer Llewellyn was chartered to replace Pearl. The surveying staff transferred from Pearl to Llewellyn in July 1878. Bedwell reported that the steamer could cover much more ground in less time than the schooner. Other survey ships that operated in Queensland during the 1860s and 1870s included HMS Salamander, HMS Virago and HMS Basilisk.

By end of 1879 the Admiralty survey had reached Cape Conway north of Mackay, but Queensland decided to withdraw from the Admiralty agreement for financial reasons. Total expenditure on the Admiralty survey in 1879 was £7961 (the increase being due to the use of Llewellyn) of which the British government only contributed £2500. However, the Pearl continued survey work for the Queensland Government, under Captain CE Pennefather, surveying ports and rivers in the Gulf of Carpentaria in the early 1880s.

Despite the withdrawal of the Queensland Government from the project, the British Admiralty continued its own surveying of Queensland waters, and the ships involved included HMS Alert from 1881, and HMS Dart from 1883. The agreement with Queensland was renewed in 1885, although this time the Admiralty accepted the larger share of costs, and the new Queensland gunboat HMS Paluma was lent to the Admiralty for survey work, charting the coast north of Bowen. This agreement expired on 31 March 1895, but co-operation between Queensland and the Admiralty continued, as a bill was introduced in the Queensland Parliament in late 1894 to continue funding the Admiralty survey (while using a British ship) at a rate of £3270 per year, for six years from 1 April 1895.

In the late 1880s HMS Myrmidon assisted with surveying the Great Barrier Reef, and in 1897 HMS Waterwitch joined northern surveying operations. During surveys Admiralty crews planted edible plants, and released pigs and goats on islands for shipwreck survivors. After Australian Federation in 1901 the Admiralty continued to work off Queensland into the 1920s, using HMS Dart, HMS Penguin, and HMS Fantome. The Hydrographic Branch of the Royal Australian Navy (RAN) was formed in 1920, and Australia's first naval survey vessel, HMAS Geranium, began surveying the Great Barrier Reef in 1924.

By the 1920s the use of Cairns Harbour was changing. The completion of the railway from Brisbane to Cairns in 1924 resulted in a decline of passenger ships travelling from the south. However, the port continued to export the produce of Far North Queensland, and was used as a naval base by the RAN and US Navy during World War II. Today the port of Cairns is mainly a cruise ship destination and fishing fleet base, although it still exports and imports goods, and continues to be used by the RAN.

== Description ==
Bessie Point is located on the southeast side of Trinity Bay, east of Cairns, and is reached by the Pine Creek-Yarrabah Road. The road runs north alongside Rolling Bay before turning sharply to the southeast at Bessie Point.

The split granite boulder on which the bench mark broad arrow is chiselled stands just to the Rolling Bay (west) side of Bessie Point, at the top of the beach, close to the road. The boulder, which lies in the intertidal zone, is roughly 3 metres (9.8 ft) in diameter and about 2 metres (6 ft 7 in) high. The upright broad arrow is chiselled in the upper half of the northwest face of the boulder. The arrow, which is above the average inundation level, is approximately 50 centimetres (20 in) tall and 70 centimetres (28 in) wide.

== Heritage listing ==
The Hydrographic Survey Bench Mark of 1878 at Bessie Point was listed on the Queensland Heritage Register on 9 May 2014 having satisfied the following criteria.

The place is important in demonstrating the evolution or pattern of Queensland's history.

The Hydrographic Survey Bench Mark at Bessie Point (1878) is important surviving evidence of the work of the Admiralty survey of Queensland's coastal waters, harbours and rivers, from 1862 to the 1920s. This survey was essential for safe shipping navigation and the economic development of Queensland.

The establishment of a bench mark at Bessie Point was an important part of the development of Cairns as the main port for Far North Queensland. A survey of Cairns Harbour, including Trinity Bay and Trinity Inlet, was necessary for safe navigation and for development of the harbour.

The place is important in demonstrating the principal characteristics of a particular class of cultural places.

The Hydrographic Survey Bench Mark at Bessie Point demonstrates the main characteristics of Admiralty survey marks; a broad arrow chiselled above inundation level into a large durable object.
