= Albion (1783 ship) =

British slave ship 1783–1793

History

Great Britain
- Name: Albion
- Namesake: Albion
- Owner: 1787:Staniforth & Co.; 1790:James Jones (Note: In the period 1789–1791, Bristol's enslaving trade was highly concentrated in the hands of a small number of firms. It was much more concentrated than the smaller trade in London, or the larger trade in Liverpool. James Jones dominated the trade out of Bristol, with about 26% of the tonnage employed. His brother Thomas accounted for about 14%. The top four firms accounted for 93.2%.)
- Builder: Liverpool
- Launched: 1783
- Fate: Abandoned July 1793; abandoned vessel recovered and sold in America

General characteristics
- Tons burthen: 150, 158, or 164 (bm)
- Length: 76 ft 4 in (23.3 m)
- Beam: 22 ft 6 in (6.9 m)
- Propulsion: Sail
- Notes: Two decks & three masts

Albion was launched at Liverpool in 1783. She made two voyages as a slave ship in the triangular trade in enslaved people before she was sold to a Bristol merchant. She then made two more enslaving voyages. In 1793 as she was on the homeward-bound leg of her fourth voyage a vessel ran into her and Albion's crew abandoned her. She then drifted to Salem, Massachusetts, where she was recovered. She was sold in Boston.

== Career ==
Albion first appears in Lloyd's Register (LR) in 1789 with T. Pinder, Standforth, owner, and trade Liverpool–Africa.

1st enslaving voyage (1787-1788): Captain Richard Pinder sailed from Liverpool on 8 May 1787.Albion acquired captives in the area between Rio Nuñez and the Assini River and arrived at St Vincent on 12 February 1788 with 265 captives. She sailed from St Vincent on 3 March and arrived back at Liverpool on 15 April. She had left with 34 crew members and suffered 9 crew deaths on the voyage.

2nd enslaving voyage (1788-1789): Captain Pinder sailed from Liverpool on 7 June 1788. Albion was off the coast of Africa by July, and acquired captives at Bassa (possibly the coast of Grand Bassa County). She arrived at Grenada in May 1789 with 336 captives. She left Grenada on 26 May and arrived back at Liverpool on 8 July. She had left with 35 crew members and suffered six crew deaths on the voyage.

This voyage and the subsequent ones took place under the provisions of Dolben's Act. Dolben's Act limited the number of enslaved people that British slave ships were allowed to carry without penalty, based on the ships' tons burthen. It was the first British legislation passed to regulate shipping of captives. For Albion the cap would have been 250 at a burthen of 150 tons, or 274 at a burthen of 164 tons.

Lloyd's Register for 1790 shows Albion's master changing from T. Pinder to C. Wade, her owner changing from Staniforth to J. Jones, and her trade from Liverpool–Africa to Bristol–Africa. James Jones purchased Albion in January 1790. (Note: James Jones was Bristol's leading slave-trading merchant.) Her master was John Robinson Wade.

3rd enslaving voyage (1790-1791): Captain Wade sailed from Bristol on 14 April 1790. Albion acquired captives at Iles de Los, Gallinhas, and Cape Grand Mount, with most of the captives coming from Gallinhas. Apparently an insurrection by her captives occurred at Grand Cape Mount in January 1791. She embarked 262 captives: 160 adult men, 72 adult women, 19 boys (two of whom were infants), and 11 girls. She arrived at St Vincent with 250 captives on 22 June 1791; nine men and three women had died on the voyage, for an overall loss rate of 4.6%.

Albion arrived back at Liverpool on 14 August. She had left Bristol with 28 crew and returned with 19. She enrolled eight crew members at Ile de Los to replace eight who had died at Gallinhas. She arrived at St Vincent with 25, and discharged five there. One more crew member died on the way back to Liverpool.

4th enslaving voyage (1792-Loss): Captain Edward Mentor sailed from Bristol on 4 August 1792. (Note: Edward Mentor died on 29 September 1800, while captain of John. At the time of his death he was one of the most experienced British slave ship captains.) Albion acquired captives at Ile de Los and left Africa on 7 February 1793. She arrived at Kingston, Jamaica on 11 March. She had embarked 161 adult males and 78 adult females. The slaves were consigned to Holcombe, Young & co.

French records show that the British enslaving ship Alby, of 18 guns, captured the French schooner Active on 27 April 1793. Active was under the command of François-Germer-Aubin Gigaux de Grandpré. There was no British ship named Alby in Lloyd's Register, in the database of British letters of marque, or in the database of voyages by enslaving ships. Albion, of this article, is the only enslaving ship named Albion listed as operating in 1793, but she does not match the description in the French records and did not appear in the database of letters of marque.

== Fate ==
On 26 June 1793 Albion sailed from Bluefields, Jamaica, with the Jamaica fleet returning to England and under escort by the frigate HMS Proserpine, the sloops Fly and Serpent, and the troop transport Europa. Albion was carrying 600 hogsheads of sugar. Another vessel in the convoy was Amity Hall, Young, master. On 4 July a gale forced Amity Hall away from the fleet, but she sighted it again on 5 July.

As Amity Hall was rejoining the fleet on 6 July she collided with Albion. The collision took place off Cape San Antonio, Cuba.

Albion's owners sued the owners of Amity Hall, arguing that the accident was the consequence of Amity Hall not following the sailing instructions for the fleet that Commodore Alms, of Proserpine, had issued. The Court found for Albion's owners.

After the collision, Mentor and Albion's crew went on board Amity Hall, and abandoned Albion. She then drifted to North American waters.

Captain John Ingersoll, of the sloop Nancy, was eight days out of Salem, Massachusetts, when he sighted Albion. (Note: Ingersoll was the uncle and future father-in-law of the mathematician Nathaniel Bowditch.) He recovered her on 3 August at 38°N 66°W. He and his crew of five men and a boy were able to carry out some repairs and pumped her dry. On her they found that her cargo consisted of sugar, rum, cotton, mahogany, and logwood. He brought her to Salem on 10 August. He registered her on 13 August, before resuming his voyage to Guadeloupe. Some official records report that Albion was sold at Boston.

The most comprehensive account of losses among British slave ships shows that 17 slave vessels were lost in 1793, but it does not show any as having been lost on the homeward leg of their voyage. Absent data on specific vessels, it is usually impossible to determine if a vessel returning to England from the West Indies was a returning Guineaman or not.
