= Trinity Bay =

Trinity Bay may refer to:

- MV Trinity Bay, a merchant ship
- Trinity Bay, Newfoundland and Labrador, Canada
- Trinity Bay (Queensland), Australia
- Trinity Bay (Texas), United States

== See also ==
- Trinity Bay North
- Trinity Bay State High School
