= HMS Flying Fish (1793) =

British naval vessel

France
- Name: L'Esperanza
- Captured: By HMS Providence in 1793

United Kingdom
- Name: HMS Flying Fish
- Acquired: 1793
- Fate: Captured by French privateers, June 1795

France
- Name: Poisson Volant
- Acquired: 1795
- Captured: By HMS Esperance and HMS Bonetta in 1797

United Kingdom
- Name: HMS Flying Fish
- Acquired: 1797
- Fate: Sold 1799

General characteristics
- Class & type: 6-gun schooner
- Tons burthen: 80 bm
- Length: 63 ft 0 in (19.20 m)
- Beam: 17 ft 0 in (5.18 m)
- Draught: 6 ft 0 in (1.83 m)
- Propulsion: Sails
- Sail plan: Schooner-rigged
- Complement: 30
- Armament: As L'Esperanza: 4 × 3-pounder guns As Flying Fish: 1793: 4 × 3-pounder guns 1796: 6 guns

HMS Flying Fish was a 6-gun schooner taken into Royal Navy service in 1793. Flying Fish is notable for being the first ship in which William Beatty served as acting-surgeon from 1793 to 1794. Beatty was the naval surgeon who would go on to famously treat Admiral Nelson at the Battle of Trafalgar in 1805.

== Early service ==
L'Esperanza was a French privateer operating out of Saint-Domingue, originally mounting four French 3-pounder guns. L'Esperanza was captured by HMS Providence, renamed Flying Fish, and was transferred to Great Britain's Jamaica Station under Commodore John Ford. In September 1793 she formed part of Commodore Ford's squadron in its attack on the French colony of Saint-Domingue along with HMS Europa and HMS Goelan. Both the towns of Jérémie and Mole St. Nicholas were captured by the squadron on 19 and 21 September, respectively, and Flying Fish helped to capture the French sloop Convention Nationale at Mole St. Nicholas.

== Acting Surgeon William Beatty ==
William Beatty, formerly a surgeon's mate aboard the frigate HMS Hermione, was appointed acting surgeon of the Flying Fish by Ford on 5 December 1793, his predecessor having died (possibly of Yellow fever) at the naval hospital in Jamaica. Under the command of Lieutenant James Prevost, Flying Fish spent the end of 1793 and the early parts of 1794 ferrying French Royalist deputations to and from Mole St. Nicholas before taking part in the blockade of Port-au-Prince, serving as a supply ship, as well as intercepting five French vessels attempting to run the blockade in less than one month. On 4 May 1794 Flying Fish helped repulse a French land attack on Fort Le Cul, in Leogane, by standing close inshore and firing on the attacking French troops. On 1 June Flying Fish was used to clear a beachhead for assaulting British troops in their attack on Port-au-Prince, again using her shallow draught to allow her to get close to the beach, firing against French soldiers on shore and helping the British forces under Ford ultimately capture the city. On 25 June 1794 he was appointed acting-surgeon of the 28-gun frigate Alligator at Port-au-Prince. In all, Beatty served aboard Flying Fish for approximately seven months.

== Capture, French service, and recapture ==
A year later, in June 1795, under the command of Lieutenant George Seaton, Flying Fish was captured by two or possibly three French privateers off Gonaive on her way to Jamaica; she was renamed Poisson Volant and taken into French service. She was recaptured by the Royal Navy on 4 May 1796 by HMS Esperance and HMS Bonetta. Sailing from Aux Cayes to New York City, Poisson Volant was intercepted by HMS Esperance and HMS Bonetta and captured; in an effort to escape, the French crew of thirty-eight men under the command of a sub-lieutenant of the French ship Concorde had cut away the gunwales of Poisson Volant and threw some of her guns overboard.

== Fate ==
From 6 May 1797 until 1799, Flying Fish mounted six guns. Flying Fish was ultimately sold out of British service in 1799.
