= East Trinity =

East Trinity Queensland
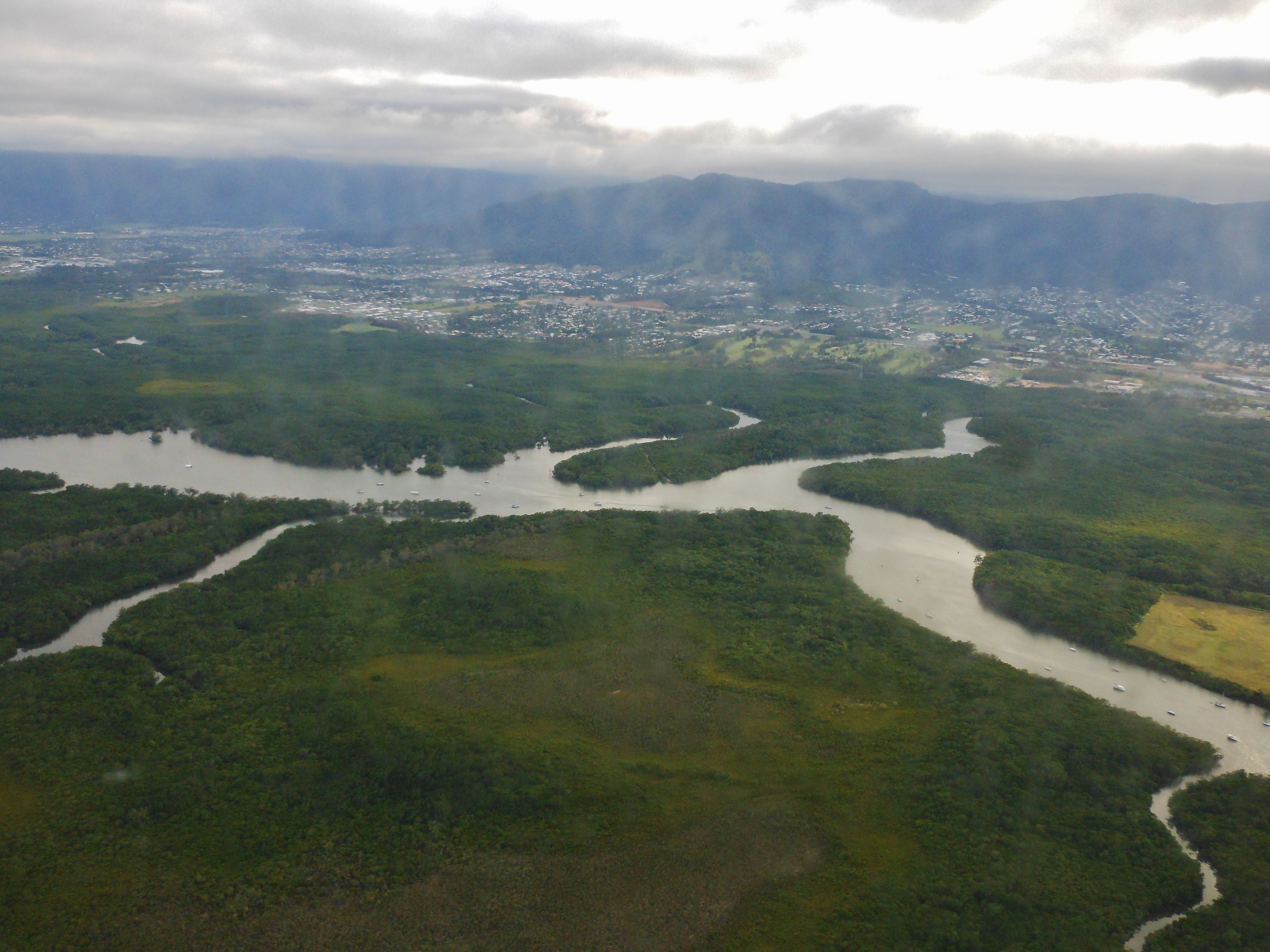
- East Trinity in the foreground with Trinity Inlet beyond and Cairns suburbs through to Mount Sheridan, 2013

- Coordinates: 16.9252°S 145.8236°E
- Population: 238 (2021 census)
  - Density: 2.527/km^{2} (6.544/sq mi)
- Postcode(s): 4871
- Area: 94.2 km^{2} (36.4 sq mi)
- Time zone: AEST (UTC+10:00)
- Location: 9.6 km (6 mi) NW of Yarrabah; 28.5 km (18 mi) NNE of Gordonvale; 41.9 km (26 mi) NE of Cairns CBD; 351 km (218 mi) NNW of Townsville; 1,682 km (1,045 mi) NNW of Brisbane
- LGA(s): Cairns Region
- State electorate(s): Mulgrave
- Federal division(s): Kennedy
Suburbs around East Trinity:
Cairns City	Coral Sea	Yarrabah
Portsmith	East Trinity	Yarrabah
Wrights Creek	Packers Camp	Green Hill

East Trinity is a coastal rural locality in the Cairns Region, Queensland, Australia. It was formerly known as Trinity East. In the 2021 census, East Trinity had a population of 238 people.

The town of Giangurra is on the northern coast of the locality (16.9033°S 145.8205°E).

== Geography ==
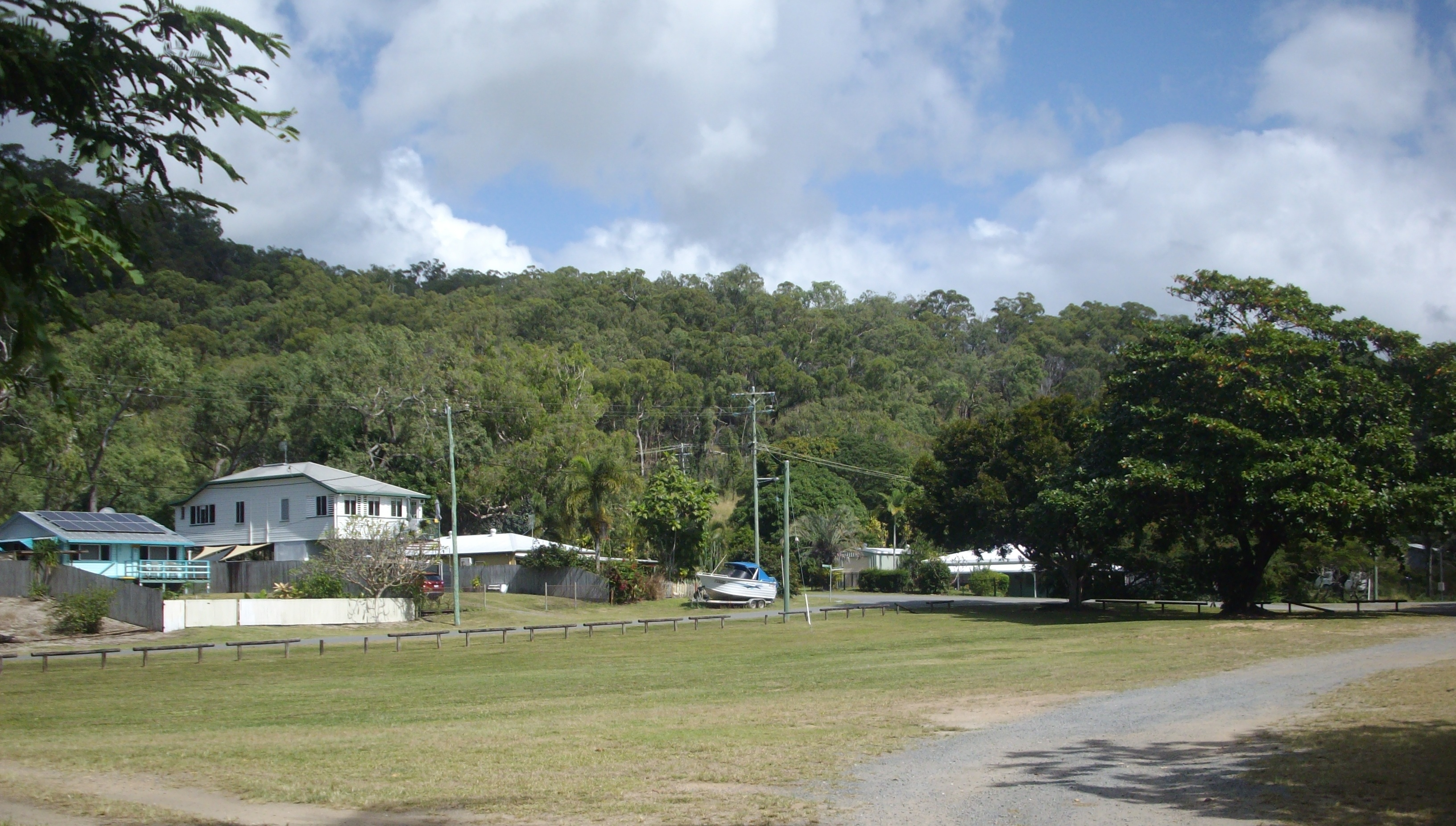
Giangurra town in East Trinity

The locality of East Trinity has the locality of Glen Boughton enclosed within it.

The northern boundary of East Trinity is the Coral Sea. The western boundary is Trinity Inlet. The south-western boundary is Pine Creek. The eastern boundary is the Murray Prior Range.

Parts of the land, water and environment in and around East Trinity have been subject to acid sulfate soil oxidisation. Acid sulfate soil remediation has been implemented to fix the impacts of soil oxidisation to the land, water and environment in East Trinity.

=== Mountains ===
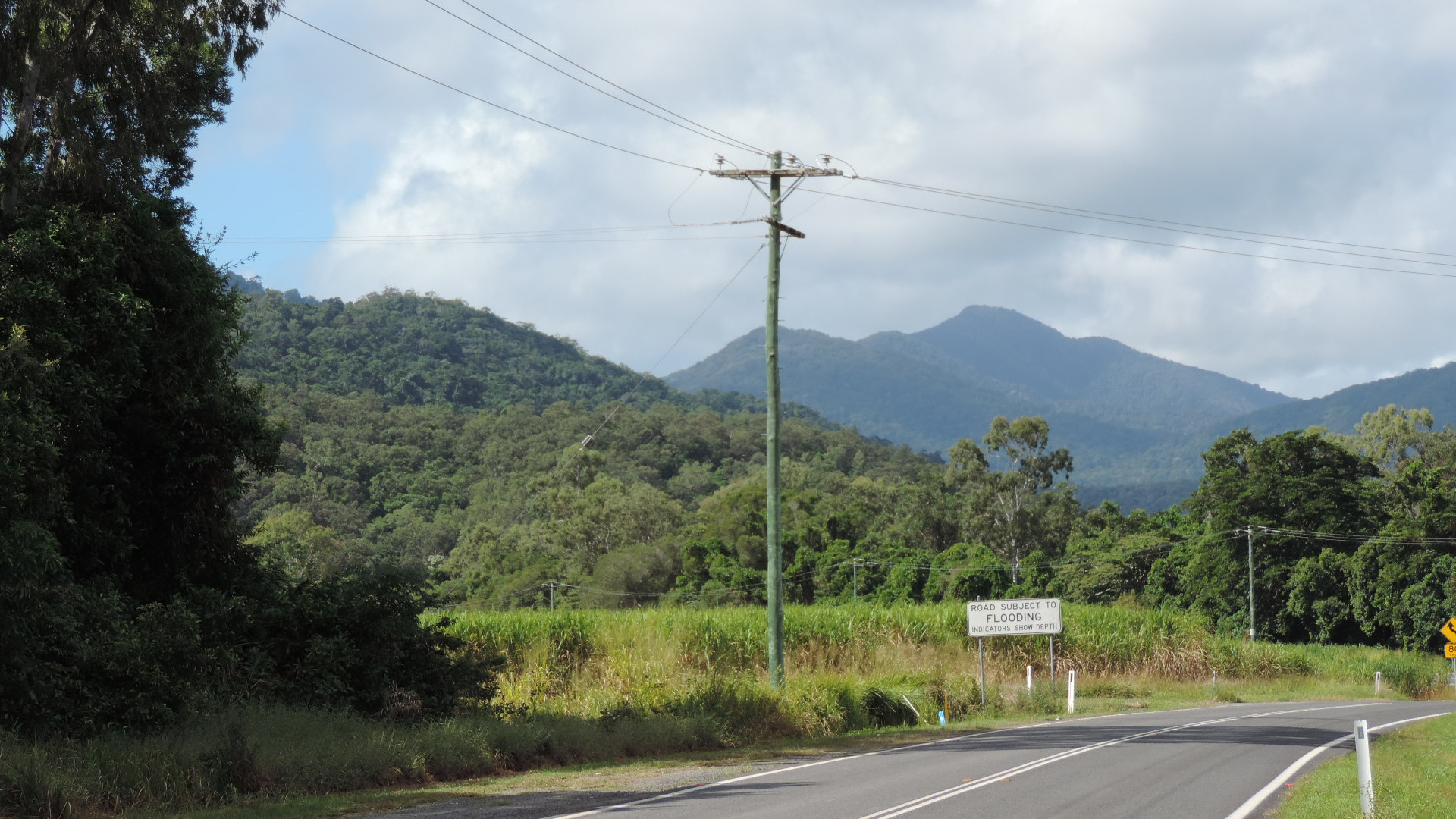
Looking south-east towards Pine Creek, 2018

East Trinity has the following mountains, all of which are in the Murray Prior Range along the locality's eastern boundary (from north to south):

- Mount Yarrabah (16.9048°S 145.8435°E) 632 metres (2,073 ft)
- Mount Murray Prior (16.9302°S 145.8483°E) 774 metres (2,539 ft)
- Mount Gorton (16.9490°S 145.8639°E) 798 metres (2,618 ft)
- May Peak (16.9701°S 145.8589°E) 834 metres (2,736 ft)

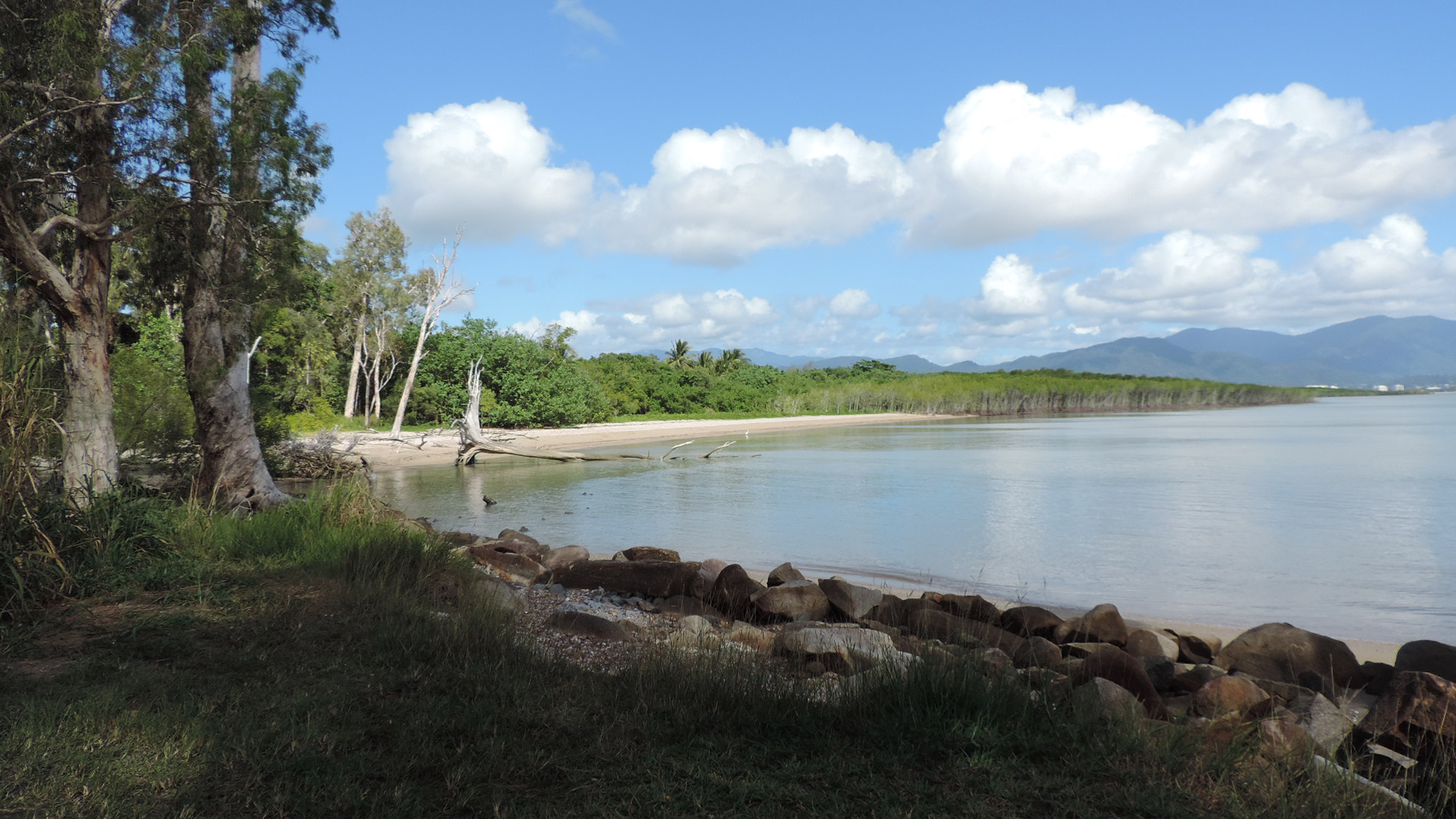
View across Rolling Bay and Trinity Bay from the beach at Pine Creek Yarrabah Road, East Trinity, 2018

=== Bays and headlands ===
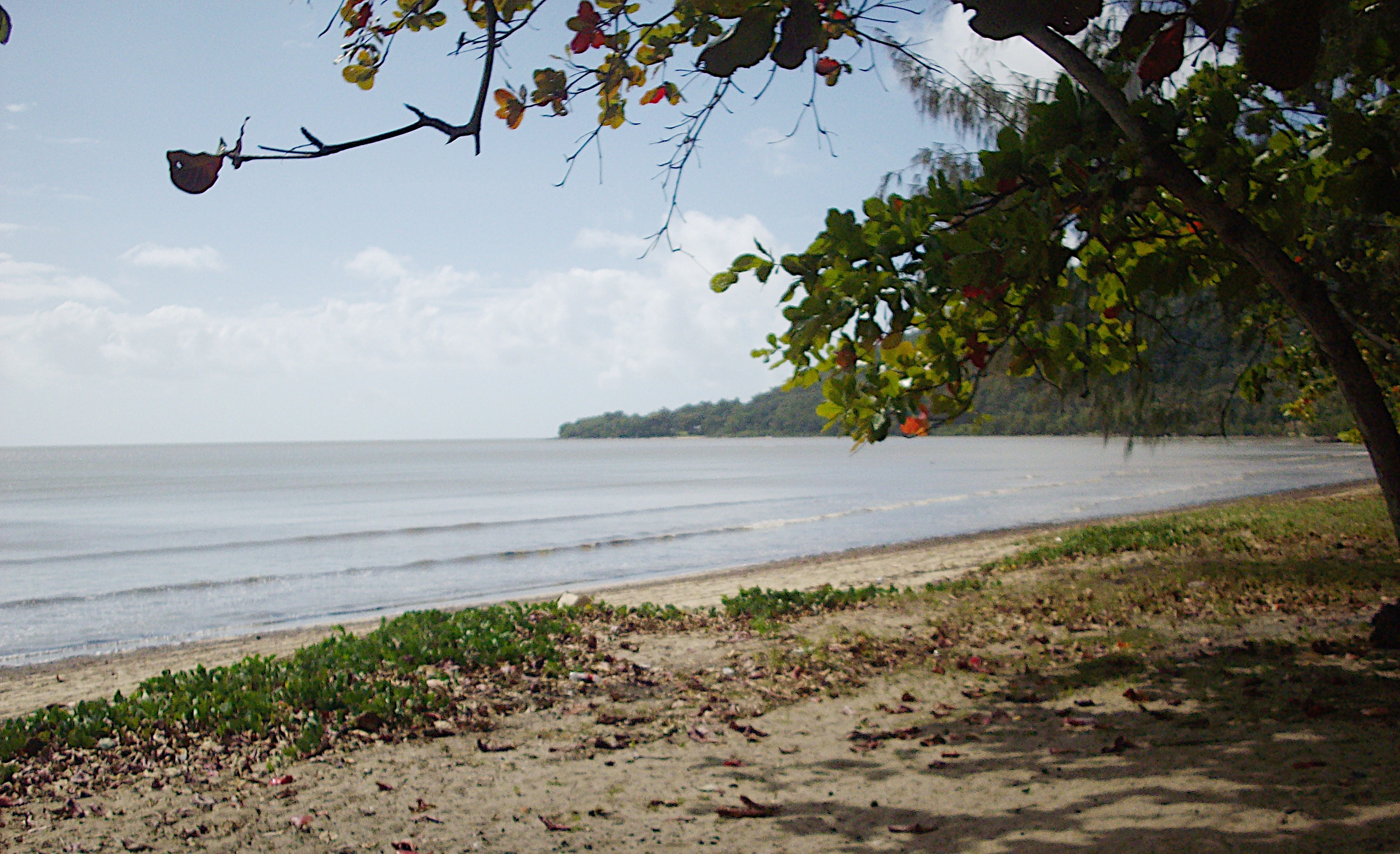
Giangurra Beach and Sturt Cove

Offshore are a number of bays and headlands (from west to east):

- Trinity Bay, to the west of False Cape, named after Trinity Sunday (10 June 1770) by Lieutenant James Cook on the HM Bark Endeavour, including side bays (from west to east):
  - Trinity Inlet (16.9263°S 145.7830°E),
  - Stafford Point (16.9185°S 145.7898°E)
  - Rolling Bay (16.9070°S 145.8098°E)
  - Bessie Point (16.9035°S 145.8124°E)
  - Sturt Cove (16.8976°S 145.8201°E)
  - Lyons Point (16.8899°S 145.8257°E)
  - Brown Bay (16.8852°S 145.8324°E)
  - Sunny Bay (16.8754°S 145.8451°E)
  - False Cape (16.8713°S 145.8488°E)
- Mission Bay to the east of False Cape (16.8868°S 145.8808°E)

== History ==
East Trinity is situated in the Yidinji traditional Aboriginal country.

Prior to 2002, the locality was known as Trinity East.

In 2020, there have been proposals for a satellite city urban development, the construction of a bridge/tunnel linking Cairns City to East Trinity, and eco-tourism proposals.

== Demographics ==
In the 2011 census, East Trinity had a population of 111 people.

In the 2016 census, East Trinity had a population of 212 people.

In the 2021 census, East Trinity had a population of 238 people.

== Heritage listings ==
East Trinity has the following heritage listings:

- Hydrographic Survey Bench Mark, Bessie Point, off Pine Creek-Yarrabah Road
- False Cape Battery, Yarrabah Road

== Education ==
There are no schools in East Trinity. The nearest government primary schools are Yarrabah State School in neighbouring Yarrabah to the north-east and Gordonvale State School in Gordonvale to the south. The nearest government secondary schools are Yarrabah State School (to Year 10 only) and Gordonvale State High School in Gordonvale.
