= HMS Proserpine (1777) =

Enterprise-class Royal Navy frigate

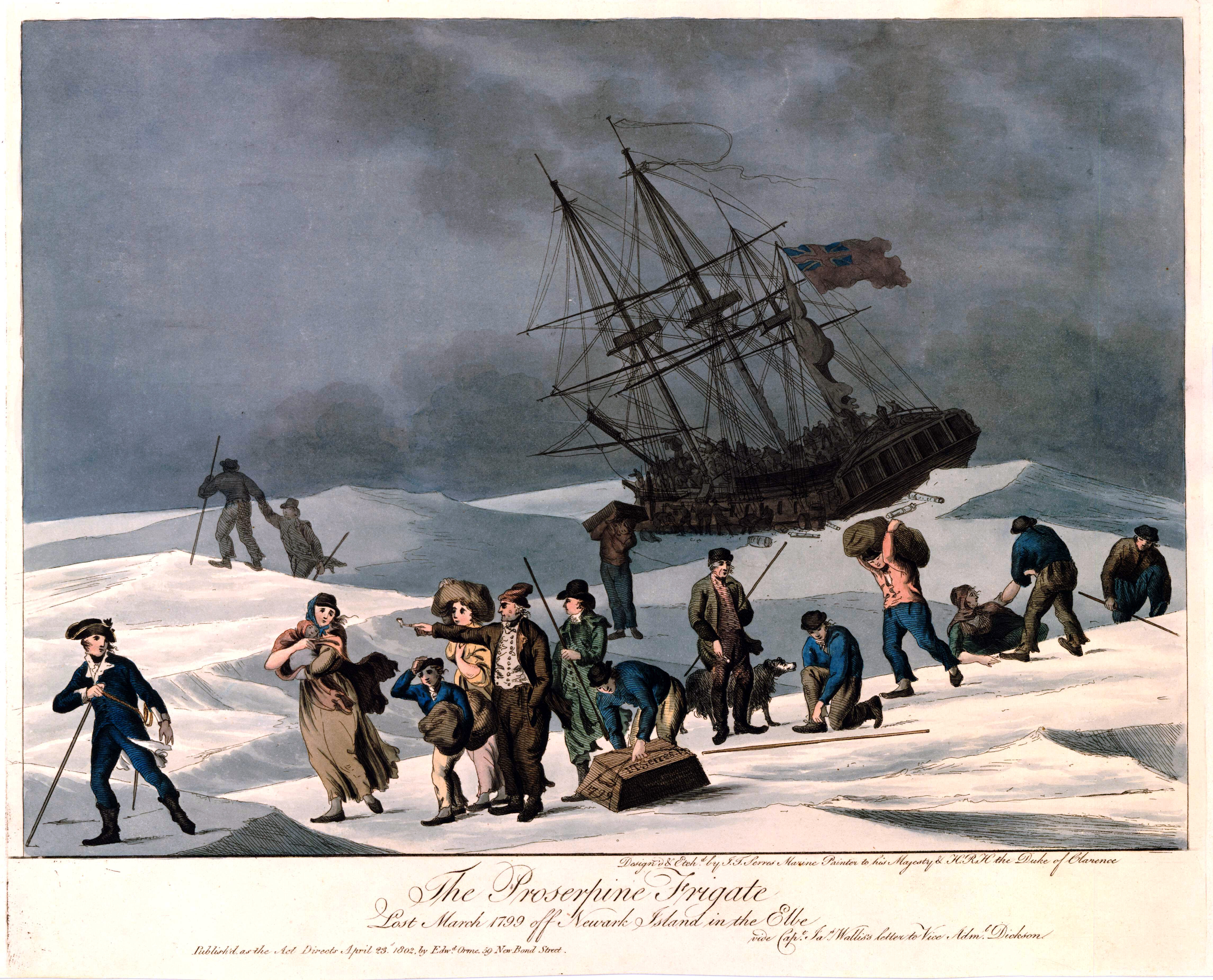
- The Proserpine Frigate Lost March 1799 off Neuwerk Island in the Elbe; John Thomas Serres

History

Great Britain
- Name: HMS Proserpine
- Ordered: 14 May 1777
- Builder: John Barnard, Harwich
- Laid down: June 1776
- Launched: 7 July 1777
- Completed: 23 September 1777 (at Sheerness Dockyard)
- Commissioned: 25 July 1777
- Fate: Wrecked 1 February 1799

General characteristics
- Class & type: 28-gun Enterprise-class sixth-rate frigate
- Tons burthen: 595 37/94 (bm)
- Length: 120 ft 6 in (36.73 m) (overall); 99 ft 0 in (30.18 m) (keel)
- Beam: 33 ft 7 1/2 in (10.2 m)
- Depth of hold: 11 ft 0 in (3.35 m)
- Sail plan: Full-rigged ship
- Complement: 200 officers and men
- Armament: Upper deck: 24 × 9-pounder guns; QD: 4 × 6-pounder guns + 4 × 18-pounder carronades; Fc: 2 × 18-pounder carronades; Also:12 × swivel guns

HMS Proserpine was a 28-gun Enterprise-class sixth-rate frigate of the Royal Navy. She was launched in 1777 was wrecked in February 1799.

== Career ==
Proserpine was first commissioned in July 1777 under the command of Captain Evelyn Sutton.

On 20 October 1779, Proserpine captured the French 26-gun frigate Alcmène, off Martinique. Alcmène had been severely damaged by a storm, and had thrown most of her guns overboard to stay afloat.

On 29 November 1779 Proserpine recaptured Sphinx (or Sphynx). She had been in French hands for three to four months.

On 26 June 1793 the Jamaica fleet returning to England sailed from Bluefields, Jamaica, under escort by Proserpine, the sloops Fly and Serpent, and the troop transport Europa. The only incident appears to have occurred in early July. On 4 July a gale forced the merchant ship Amity Hall away from the fleet, but she sighted it again on 5 July. As Amity Hall was rejoining the fleet on 6 July she collided with the merchant ship Albion. Albion's crew abandoned her and Amity Hall took them on board. The accident gave rise to a tort court case that Amity Hall's owners lost to Albion's owners on the grounds that Amity Hall's master had not followed the sailing instructions that Captain Alms of Proserpine had issued on setting out.

On 16 March 1794 Penelope captured the French brick-aviso, Goéland, off Jérémie. Proserpine shared in the prize money, suggesting that she was in company with, or in sight of, Penelope. The Royal Navy briefly took Goéland into service as HMS Goelan.

On 26 March 1798 Proserpine, Captain James Wallis, captured the Danish merchant ship Neptunus.

Proserpine was part of Admiral Duncan's squadron and so shared in the proceeds of the capture of Hoop (6 June 1798), Neptune (12 June), Stadt Embden (14 June), Rose and Endraft (14 June), Hoop (15 June), and Vrow Dorothea (16 June).

== Fate ==
Proserpine was wrecked off the mouth of the Elbe on 1 February 1799. She was under the command of Captain James Wallis, and was taking the Honourable Thomas Grenville and his party to Cuxhaven, from where they were to proceed on a diplomatic mission to meet Frederick William III of Prussia in Berlin during the War of the Second Coalition. By 4pm on 31 January the weather had worsened to such a degree that Proserpine had to anchor, four miles short of Cuxhaven. The weather worsened, and by next morning the channels were blocked by ice. Wallis got underway to attempt to withdraw and reach a Danish port, but around 9:30pm she grounded. Attempts to lighten her failed. The next morning it became clear that she was aground on the Scharhörn Sand near Newark Island in the Elbe, and completely blocked in by ice, which was increasing.

At 1:30, all 187 persons on Proserpine left her and started the six-mile walk to shore, in freezing weather and falling snow. Seven seamen, a boy, four Royal Marines, and one woman and her child died; the rest made it safely to Neuwerk where they took shelter in the tower there. The diplomatic party reached Cuxhaven a few days later.

The ship's master, Mr. Anthony, took five men and returned to Proserpine on 10 February. They found her crushed. While they were still on board, the ship (still encased in ice), was swept out to sea, before she grounded again on Baltrum Island. Anthony and his companions survived this second shipwreck too.
