= Giangurra, Queensland =

Town in Queensland, Australia

Giangurra
- Town
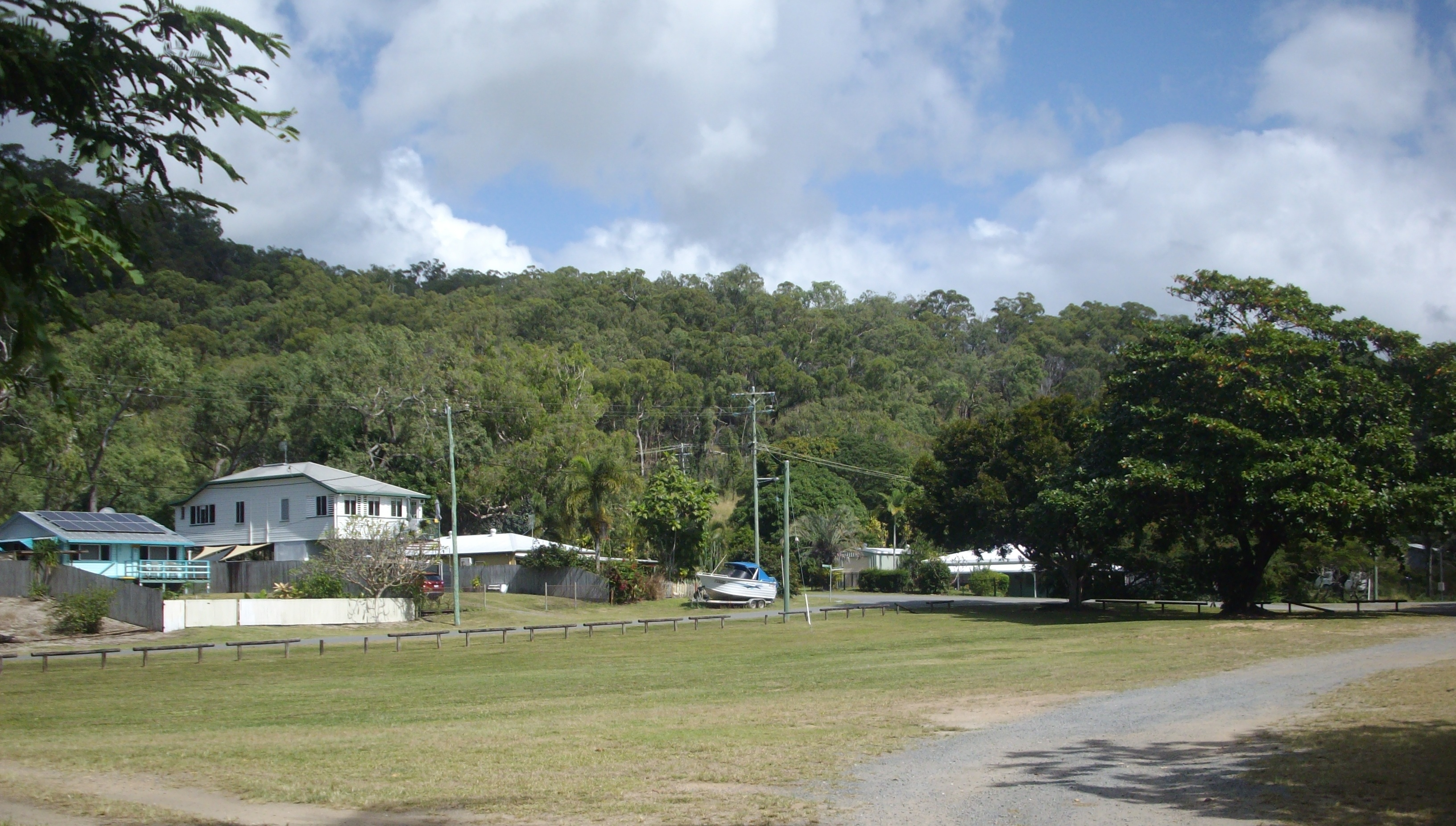
- Giangurra town in East Trinity

- Interactive map of Giangurra
- Coordinates: 16.9033°S 145.8205°E
- Country: Australia
- State: Queensland
- LGA: Cairns Region
- Location: 12.3 km (7.6 mi) W of Yarrabah; 26.0 km (16.2 mi) NNE of Gordonvale; 39.5 km (24.5 mi) ENE of Cairns CBD; 348 km (216 mi) NNW of Townsville; 1,689 km (1,049 mi) NNW of Brisbane

Government
  - State electorate: Mulgrave
  - Federal division: Kennedy
- Time zone: UTC+10:00 (AEST)
- Postcode: 4871

Giangurra is a coastal town in the Cairns Region, Queensland, Australia. It is within the locality of East Trinity on the eastern coast of Trinity Bay.

== Geography ==
Giangurra is on the northern coast of East Trinity near Bessie Point (16.9035°S 145.8124°E)

== History ==
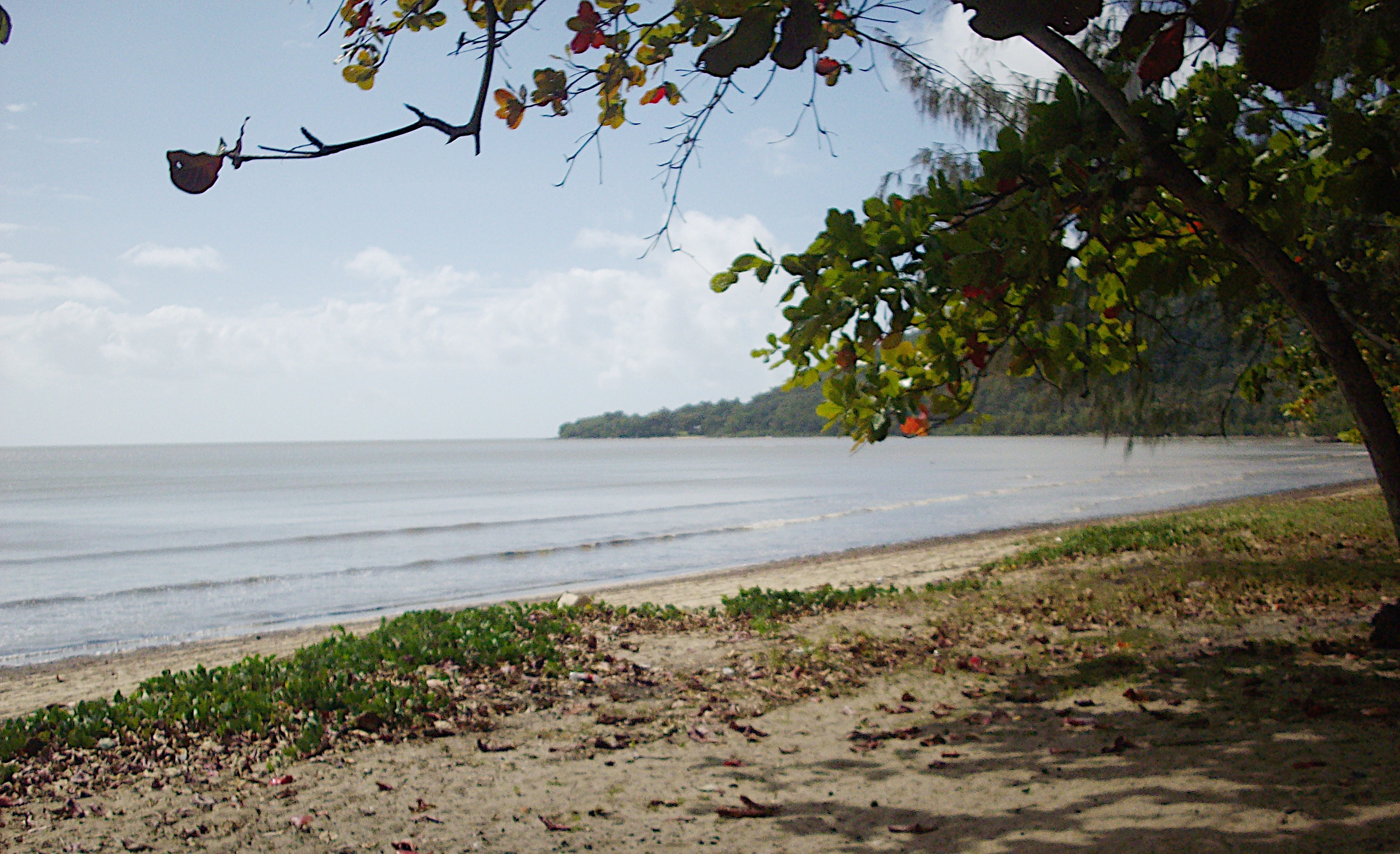
Giangurra Beach and Sturt Cove

The name Giangurra means village of wild rose thorn, but the language or dialect is unknown.

The town was named on 1 December 1962 by the Queensland Place Names Board.

== Education ==
There are no schools in Giangurra. The nearest government primary school is Yarrabah State School in Yarrabah to the east. The nearest government secondary schools are Yarrabah State School (to Year 10) and Gordonvale State High School (to Year 12) in Gordonvale to the south.
