= French brick-aviso Goéland =

History

France
- Name: Goéland
- Namesake: Goéland, the Breton word for seagull
- Builder: Bayonne
- Launched: 4 May 1787
- Fate: Captured 1793

Great Britain
- Name: HMS Goelan
- Acquired: 1793 by capture
- Fate: Sold 1794

Great Britain
- Name: Brothers
- Owner: Various
- Acquired: 1794 by purchase
- Fate: Listed until at least 1815, but not after 1816

General characteristics
- Class & type: Goéland-class brick-aviso
- Tons burthen: 248 (bm)
- Propulsion: Sails
- Sail plan: brig
- Complement: c.65 (French service)
- Armament: French Navy: 10 small guns; Royal Navy: 14 × 9-pounder guns; Merchantman: between 4 × 4-pounder and 10 × 6-pounder guns

Goéland was the name ship of a two-vessel class of "brick-avisos" (advice brigs), built to a design by Raymond-Antoine Haran and launched in 1787. She served the French Navy for several years carrying dispatches until in 1793 HMS Penelope and HMS Proserpine captured her off Jérémie. The Royal Navy took her into service briefly as Goelan and sold her in 1794. As the merchant brig Brothers she appears to have sailed as a whaling ship in the British southern whale fishery until 1808 or so, and then traded between London and the Brazils. She is no longer listed after 1815.

== French service ==
Lieutenant de vaisseau Le Tourneur carried dispatches from Brest to Newfoundland and St Pierre (probably Saint Pierre and Miquelon) on a voyage that lasted from 12 June 1790 until 3 November. The renowned French naval officer, Jean-Marthe-Adrien l'Hermite served on her as a junior officer on one of these voyages when she escorted the fishing fleet from Granville to Newfoundland.

On 12 September 1791 Goéland was at Brest, under the command of sous-lieutenant de vaisseau Le Dall de Kerangalet.

In April 1793 Goéland was sailing from Cap-Français to Jérémie while under the command of lieutenant de vaisseau Leissègues de Pennenyum. Early on the 16th Leissègues was seeking to enter the bay while searching for a convoy he was to escort when he observed an enemy frigate at the entrance. (Note: Troude gives the date as 26 April, but all other records give the date as 16 April.) The British frigate immediately set out to drive Goéland on shore. At 7a.m. she received her first shots and by 9.a.m. the British frigate was no more than pistol-shot away. Goéland fired back, but resistance was futile. Leissègues was forced to strike to the frigate Penelope. Proserpine shared with Penelope in the prize money, suggesting that she was in company with Penelope, or in sight. (Note: The Chester Courant of 10 December 1793, lists her name as Le Geslan.)

== Royal Navy ==
The British took Goéland into service as Goelan. Commander Thomas Wolley was appointed Goelan's captain at Jamaica.

In September 1793, at the request of French Royalists, Commodore John Ford took a squadron and attacked Saint-Domingue and Jérémie in the Caribbean. On 23 September 1793 the British captured four merchant vessels at L'Islet, and on the 29th seven at Flamande Bay. At Môle-Saint-Nicolas, on 23 September, Europa, Goelan, and Flying Fish captured the Convention Nationale, among other vessels.

In December command passed to Lieutenant George Hopewell Stephens (temp), who sailed Goelan to Portsmouth, arriving on 27 August 1794.

== Whaling ==
Goelan was offered for sale at Sheerness in 1794. She was sold at Portsmouth on 16 October 1794 for £590. Her buyers renamed her Brothers and used her in commerce.

Brothers, of 242 tons (bm), Anderson, master, and Mather & Co. owners, was employed in the South Sea Whale Fishery between 1796 and 1798. She sailed in February 1796 and returned in December. She was reported off the coast of Brazil in January 1797, returning to Britain in 1797 and sailing again in October.

Under Captain William Smith she was employed in the South Sea Whale Fishery in 1798. She was on the protection list for 1799, returning in May.

Lloyd's Register for 1799 shows a Brothers, French-built, 13 years old, and 242 tons (bm). This vessel continues in commercial service until at least 1813. She is no longer listed in 1816. The information in Lloyd's Register is not entirely consistent with that from other sources for the period 1799 to 1808, but does overlap them to a great degree.

Year	Master	Owner	Trade	Notes
1799	Anderson	Mathers & Co.	London & South Seas; then London transport	4 × 4-pounder guns
1802	Anderson	Mathers & Co.	London & South Seas; then London transport	No notation re armament
1804	Anderson, then W. Perry	Mathers & Co.	London transport	6 × 6-pounder guns
1805	W. Perry	Mathers & Co.	London & South Seas	6 × 6-pounder guns
1806	W. Perry, then Kasells	Mathers, then Elliot	London & South Seas	6 × 6-pounder guns
1807	O. Russell	Elliot & Co.	London & South Seas	8 × 6-pounder guns
1808	O. Russell	Elliot & Co.	London & South Seas	8 × 6-pounder guns
1809	O. Russell, then Holmes	Elliot & Co.	London & South Seas	8 × 6-pounder guns

Captain Thomas Folger sailed Brothers to the South Seas in October 1802. At that time she was valued at £5,500. She was reported "all well" off the coast of Chile in March 1803. Cyrus recorded in her logs that Brother was returning in July 1804 from the Pacific with 150 tons of sperm oil.

In September Brothers sailed from Britain under the command of Captain W. Perry for Mather & Co. and Elliot. She was in the Fishery in 1805, left St Helena in January 1806, and returned to Britain in April 1806.

Under the command of Captain Oliver Russell, Brothers whaled in Australian waters in 1807. She was reported at the Cape of Good Hope in April 1807, homeward bound from the South Seas. She returned to Britain in September 1807.

== Trading ==
Year	Master	Owner	Trade	Notes
1810	H. Holmes	Hullet	London & the Brazils	4 × 6-pounder guns + 6 × 12-pounder carronades
1811	H. Holmes	Hullet	London & the Brazils	4 × 6-pounder guns + 6 × 12-pounder carronades
1812	H. Holmes	Hullet	London & the Brazils	4 × 6-pounder guns + 6 × 12-pounder carronades
1813	H. Holmes	Hullet	London & the Brazils	4 × 6-pounder guns + 6 × 12-pounder carronades
1814	H. Holmes	Hullet	London & the Brazils	4 × 6-pounder guns + 6 × 12-pounder carronades
1815	H. Holmes	Hullet	London & the Brazils	4 × 6-pounder guns + 6 × 12-pounder carronades
1816				No longer listed

The data in this table comes from the Register of Shipping. It differs from the data in Lloyd's Register, which gives the owner as Elliot & Co., the trade as Falmouth and the Brazils. Also the armament in Lloyd's Register was ten 6-pounder guns.

== Fate ==
Brothers is no longer listed in 1816.
