= False Cape Battery =

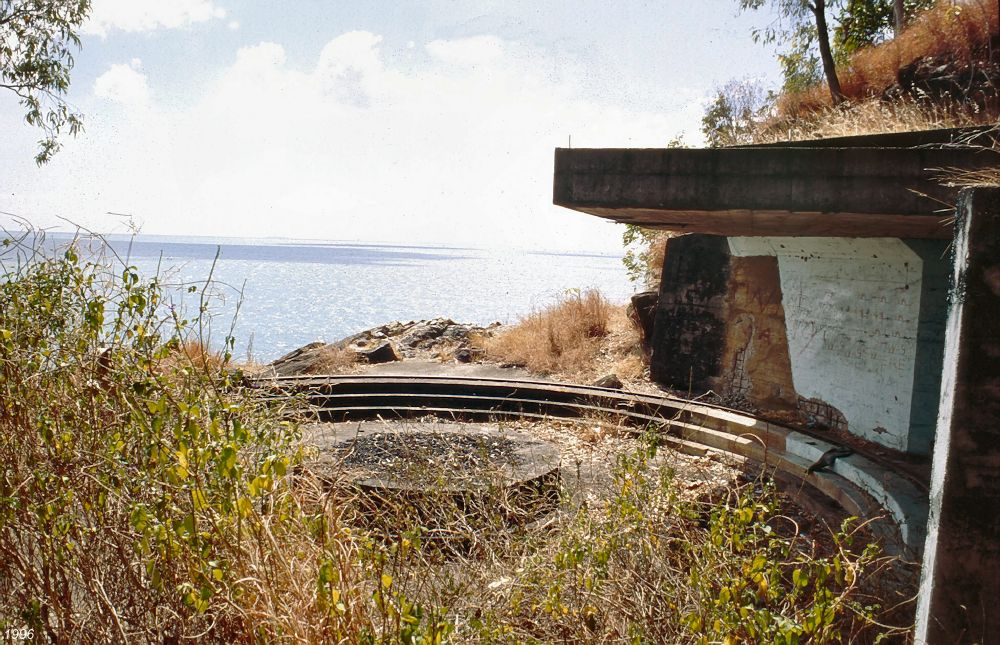
- False Cape Battery, 1996

- Location within Queensland Location within Australia
- 16.872°S 145.849°E
- Location: Yarrabah Road, East Trinity, Cairns Region, Queensland, Australia

History
- Design period: 1939 – 1945 (World War II)
- Built: 1942–1943

Queensland Heritage Register
- Official name: False Cape Second World War Defence Facility, Leper Bay
- Type: state heritage (built, archaeological)
- Designated: 18 April 1997
- Reference no.: 600975
- Significant period: 1942–1943 (fabric); 1942–1945 (historical); 1870s–1950s (social)
- Significant components: objects (movable) – defence, embankment – railway, gun emplacement, machine gun mounting, signal mast anchor point, magazine / explosives store, pathway/walkway, camouflage net securing points, tank – water, observation post (military), slab/s – concrete, culvert – stream

False Cape Battery is a heritage-listed fortification at Yarrabah Road, East Trinity, Cairns Region, Queensland, Australia. It was built from 1942 to 1943 during World War II. It is also known as Leper Bay. It was added to the Queensland Heritage Register on 18 April 1997.

== History ==
The defence facility at False Cape was established in late 1942-early 1943 as coastal defence for the port of Cairns on Trinity Inlet. Although this battery was never involved in direct action, its establishment was prioritised by General Douglas Macarthur as of strategic importance to the overall defence of the east coast of Australia. Following the establishment of Cairns in the mid-1870s, False Cape (named by Captain James Cook in 1770 and accessible only by boat) became a popular recreational venue. In July 1884, 100 acres (40 ha) from False Cape to the creek running into what is now known as Sunny Bay, was proclaimed a reserve for a Pilot Station on Trinity Harbour. In 1910 this was extended to 250 acres (100 ha). In late 1889 the bay on the southwest side of the Cape became a temporary lazaret when a Chinese and a Malay from Cairns were isolated here for a few months, pending transfer to the leper station at Dayman Island in the Torres Strait. They were housed in tents erected on the slope of the hill overlooking the beach, which became known as Leper Bay. Although False Cape was never gazetted as a lazaret, it may have served for some decades as an occasional, temporary isolation area. In the 20th century this function ceased, and the name of the beach was changed to Sunny Bay.

In February 1940, following the outbreak of the Second World War in September 1939, Australian military reconnaissance identified two possible sites for the installation of fixed coastal defences at Trinity Inlet: the Esplanade in Cairns, or a preferred site extending from Lyons Point to False Cape, across the inlet from Cairns. By April 1940 the decision had been taken not to proceed with the defence of Cairns, despite increasing Japanese aggression in the Pacific region through 1940–41 and repeated requests by the Queensland Premier, William Forgan Smith, for the Australian Government to construct fortifications along the Queensland coast. The Australian Government committed little to northern coastal defences at this period, not even following Japan's simultaneous attacks on Hawaii, Hong Kong and Malaya in December 1941. Believing that alone, Australia could not defend the whole of the continent, the Australian Government prioritised the defence of the industrial and commercial southeast of Australia, declared the area north of Mackay a war zone in March 1942, and concentrated on a policy of civilian evacuation from North Queensland.

Following the appointment of General Douglas Macarthur as Supreme Commander of Allied Forces, South West Pacific Area, United States military forces which had retreated to southern Australia following their January 1942 defeat in the Philippines, were transferred to north Queensland. From early 1942 Townsville became the base for Allied operations in the Pacific, but both the Royal Australian Navy and the United States Navy concentrated their base operations in Cairns, as this port was less congested. Establishing an advanced operational air base at Cairns for the Royal Australian Air Force's Catalina squadrons also became a priority. Following the Coral Sea and Midway campaigns in mid-1942 the war moved north to New Guinea, and Cairns became an important base for air force and naval operations in the New Guinea offensive. The Port of Cairns became a Supply Service Depot, with deliveries from larger vessels broken up for transfer to small ships to reduce potential loss from enemy attack. In 1943–1944 the Australian Army established major training and hospital/rehabilitation camps on the Atherton Tableland, just behind Cairns.

Despite the strong military presence in Cairns and district from early 1942, and substantial expenditure by the Allied Works Council on port improvements, Cairns harbour remained unprotected until General Macarthur instigated the coastal defence of selected Australian ports and naval bases following his arrival in Australia in March 1942. During 1942–1943 nineteen 2-gun batteries (designated by alphabet letter and hence known as 'Letter Batteries') were established and allocated to coastal defence in Australia and New Guinea. To equip these units, Macarthur requested from Washington the supply of 155-millimetre (6.1 in) guns, Sperry searchlights and associated equipment.

During 1942–1943, Cairns was the closest major Australian port to the war in the South Pacific, and movement of shipping in and out of the port via Grafton Passage (16°39′S 146°45′E) needed to be protected from enemy attack and from enemy minelaying. There was also a need to communicate with shipping, particularly with troopships in the Outer Passage. On 25 December 1942, 127 men of H Australian Heavy Battery arrived in Cairns to establish and man the battery at False Cape. The site selected commanded the passageway from Cairns Harbour to the open sea, and was of high strategic value.

Initially, H Battery was accommodated in tents near a small freshwater stream emptying into Sunny Bay, about 500 yards (460 m) south of the gun emplacements, while camp buildings were erected there by the local Civil Construction Corps. Constructed mostly of timber from Johnson's sawmill at Stratford, on the outskirts of Cairns, these buildings were of a standard rectangular design measuring 60 by 20 feet (18.3 by 6.1 m). They included: 7 barrack rooms, officers' quarters, sergeants' quarters (each of these having separate ablution blocks and latrines), battery office, quarter master's store, officers' mess and kitchen, gunners' mess and kitchen, canteen and recreation room, and a small battery charging room to supply the camp with electricity. About 150 yards (140 m) north of the camp a workshop was erected, and north of this, about half-way between the camp and the defence installations, a hospital and RAP shelter were built. There was no road from Cairns to the camp, which had to be supplied via boat (the unit had its own two-masted vessel, the Eulalie). A timber jetty was constructed at Sunny Bay near the camp site, and closer to the Cape a stone and concrete ramp for a landing barge.

The creek at Sunny Bay flowed only during the wet season, so a small pumping station was established further south at the creek emptying into Brown's Bay, pumping water through a narrow pipe along the foreshore to the camp at Sunny Bay and on to the Cape. A rough road was cut from Sunny Bay to False Cape, just above the foreshore, and the unit's one Blitz truck transported supplies and meals from the camp to the defence installations. A cutting was made for a small rail line which was used to winch supplies and equipment from the road and beach to the Battery Observation Post at the top of the ridge.

The defence installations at False Cape were concrete structures, comprising two gun emplacements, a battery observation post, and a main magazine which stored 400 rounds of 155-millimetre (6.1 in) ammunition for the two guns. Ready ammunition was housed in smaller shell and cartridge magazines constructed as part of each gun emplacement. Duty personnel quarters, probably of timber construction, were erected adjacent to the battery observation post. An anti-aircraft gun was mounted above the main magazine and No.2 gun emplacement. All of these installations were camouflaged with netting.

Staff in a typical Battery Observation Post measured bearing and range to the target. This information was plotted on a plotting table, which converted target data into gun data of azimuth and elevation, which in turn was called continuously to the sight setters on the guns. The standard rangefinder used was a vertical base rangefinder, whose effective range depended upon the height above sea level. For the rangefinder to be useful to the maximum range of the guns, it was necessary for it to be mounted as high as possible above sea level. The topography of False Cape favoured a vertical base rangefinder, set high on the ridge behind the gun emplacements.

Supporting H Battery at False Cape was the 105 Coastal Artillery Searchlight Section, comprising about 13 men of the Royal Australian Engineers. They operated two 150-centimetre (59 in) Sperry searchlights with petrol driven electric generation, one of which may have been located near the jetty at Sunny Bay, and the other on the eastern side of the cape. In September 1943 an advance party of the 64th Anti-Aircraft Searchlight Company set up 12 searchlight stations in and around Cairns, and it is possible one of these was located at False Cape. Coastal defence batteries were usually supported also by light machine gun and anti-aircraft positions for local and air defence.

In December 1943 the Royal Australian Navy established a Port War Signal Station at False Cape, shifting personnel from the war signal station at Archer Point, which was closed down early in December. They may have shared the observation post with the army, as at Magnetic Island, although a 1944 plan of the area indicates navy accommodation in a separate structure at the crest of the hill. The signal station closed at the end of June 1945, following the movement of the Australian Army south.

H Australian Heavy Battery remained at False Cape until February/March 1944, when they were moved to Townsville and embarked on SS Taroona for a 5 month deployment at Milne Bay, New Guinea. On return to Townsville H Australian Heavy Battery moved to Fortress Sydney where the Unit disbanded in September, 1944. They were replaced by S Battery, which had been formed in Sydney in September 1943, trained in Brisbane, then moved to False Cape in late February 1944. In August 1944 this unit was re-organised as Coastal Artillery Cairns, and is thought to have remained at False Cape until the cessation of hostilities in the Pacific in August 1945. The guns and searchlights are understood to have been removed at this time.

After the war the timber camp structures and the water pipeline and pumping equipment from Brown's Bay were sold to nearby Yarrabah Mission for removal. All that remained of the camp at Sunny Bay were the concrete slabs on which the timber buildings had been erected. In the late 1940s, fishermen erected small huts on a number of these.

In 1946, 298 acres (121 ha) at False Cape was acquired formally by the Australian Government, anticipating that a coastal defence facility might be maintained here after the war. This area comprised the 250 acres (100 ha) formerly declared a Reserve for Pilot Station by the Queensland Government, part of a recreation reserve to the south of this, and about 12 acres (4.9 ha) of the Yarrabah reserve, gazetted a Reserve for the Aboriginal Inhabitants of the Colony in 1892, and extended to include this area in 1935. However, in 1947 the land was declared surplus to army requirements, and leased to private enterprise, including a tourist operator in the 1950s. No tourist facilities eventuated, but in the post-war year Sunny Bay and False Cape once again became popular as a recreational venue. A number of small weekend/fishermen's shacks were erected in the area, and the remains of a more substantial, stone-walled c. 1950s or 1960s weekender survive on the beach at Sunny Bay. Title to the site was transferred from the Australian Government to private ownership in 1969.

== Description ==
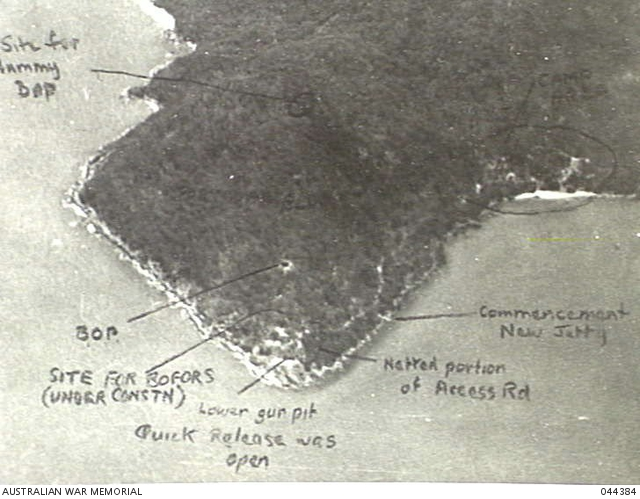
Sketch map of the False Cape Battery, 1943

False Cape is situated at the entrance to Cairns Harbour and overlooking Grafton Passage, 9.5 kilometres (5.9 mi) NNE of the city as the crow flies, but 40 kilometres (25 mi) from Cairns by road.

Structural elements of the coastal artillery battery and support base remain. These comprise:

=== Upper and Lower Gun Emplacements ===
The gun emplacements are symmetrical, single-storeyed structures of off-form concrete, waffle slab roof supported on three columns with earth fill on top, Australian-designed circular recoil pit with central pad and outlying rail for gun carriage traverse, side magazines of concrete and concrete block construction. Camouflage net pivot points are extant, and doors remain on the lower emplacement magazines. The robust off-form concrete construction is unlike the two-storeyed coastal battery gun emplacements of Moreton Bay, where timber as well as concrete was used structurally.

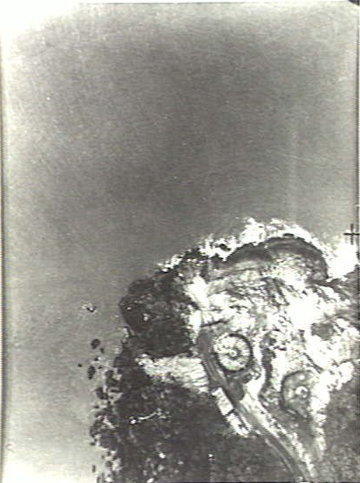
Aerial view of False Cape Battery, 1943

=== Battery Observation Post ===
Situated on the high ridge above the gun emplacements, the battery observation post is a two-level structure built of off-form concrete, to house the range finder and the command post. External timber stairs survive, and rooftop fittings that formerly carried a camouflage netted structure. The upper level contains original timber joinery to observation slit and doorway and four intact concrete mounting blocks, possibly for a vertical rangefinder. The lower level comprises one large room with steel-reinforced concrete support beam and pillar beneath the mounting blocks in the upper level. Both levels contain evidence of a later interior fitout as residential accommodation.

=== Main Magazine ===
The main magazine was constructed of off-form concrete, with a corridor around three sides of two rooms that are built against the side of the hill. Markings remain of the storage racks that held ammunition for the guns.

=== Machine gun position ===
An anti-aircraft gun mount is located above the main magazine, and comprises a vertically mounted length of steel pipe with flanges at each end. This is thought to be the only anti- aircraft gun mount remaining at a Second World War coastal battery in Queensland.

=== Signal Station ===
A steel ring in a concrete slab may have anchored the signal mast of the Port War Signal Station erected at False Cape by the Navy.

=== Winch area and cutting ===
There is evidence on the foreshore on the western side of the Cape, below the Battery Observation Post (BOP), of a concrete and rock pathway leading from the road down to the water, where 1940s photographs show a rock jetty in this position. A rusted gearbox lying beside this pathway may be that used in the winch. Above the road is the cutting (somewhat overgrown) where a rail line was laid to winch equipment and supplies from the road and the beach to the Battery Observation Post high on the hill. At the top of the cutting, to the side of the BOP, is a concrete slab which may have been associated with the rail wagon and winch area.

Base end station – a concrete platform resting on a stone and concrete foundation, is all that remains of the base end station on the eastern side of False Cape.

=== Rock with platform at Sunny Bay ===
Situated at the north end of Sunny Bay, on the beach, is a large granite rock on which a concrete platform has been constructed. Recessed edges on the platform indicate that it once supported walls.

=== Road and Camp Site ===
Approximately 500 yards (460 m) south of the defence installations on False Cape there is remnant evidence of the camp site at Sunny Bay that accommodated the coastal artillery, searchlight, anti-aircraft, and naval signal units involved in port defence. The road from the camp to the defence installation is still trafficable, with a concrete culvert where it crosses over the intermittent freshwater stream at Sunny Bay. There is a concrete rainwater tank on the ridge midway between the former camp site and the Cape. The cleared area of the camp site is now overgrown with secondary growth, but several concrete slabs which formerly supported walls survive, and there may be others yet to be identified. Three timber stumps in the foreshore at Sunny Bay are remnants of the timber jetty which once extended into the bay.

== Heritage listing ==
False Cape Battery was listed on the Queensland Heritage Register on 18 April 1997 having satisfied the following criteria.

The place is important in demonstrating the evolution or pattern of Queensland's history.

The battery is important historically as the principal coastal defence for the port of Cairns, which served as a major trans-shipping port for Australian and United States armed services supplies and troop movements as the war with Japan moved into the Coral Sea and then north to New Guinea in the early 1940s.

The place demonstrates rare, uncommon or endangered aspects of Queensland's cultural heritage.

It is thought to be the last surviving Second World War complex in the immediate Cairns region, and is important in illustrating Australia's role in building coastal defence installations during the Second World War.

The place has potential to yield information that will contribute to an understanding of Queensland's history.

It also has the potential to yield further information about the relationship between the equally important components of this coastal battery complex, including the defence installations (battery observation post, gun emplacements, magazine and other remnant elements), the supporting base camp at Sunny Bay, and infrastructure such as the road, jetty remnants, and winch area and cutting.

The place is important in demonstrating the principal characteristics of a particular class of cultural places.

The place demonstrates some of the principal characteristics of a Second World War coastal battery in Queensland, but with distinctive local design and construction of gun emplacements to accommodate US-provided equipment, and the siting of the elements of the complex contribute to an understanding of how the coastal defence battery was designed to operate.

The place is important because of its aesthetic significance.

The whole of the area has an aesthetic value, and the defence installations in particular have landmark quality.

The place has a strong or special association with a particular community or cultural group for social, cultural or spiritual reasons.

The place has a special association for the local community, not just as a recreational venue for over 120 years, but also for its association with the Second World War, which had a significant impact on Cairns and district.
