= Amity Hall (1789 ship) =

History

Great Britain
- Name: Amity Hall
- Owner: G. Tarbutt
- Builder: River Thames
- Launched: 1789
- Fate: Wrecked 1794

General characteristics
- Tons burthen: 316 (bm)
- Propulsion: Sail

Amity Hall was a ship launched on the River Thames in 1789. She was a West Indiaman of little note until 1793 when she struck the slave ship Albion, leading Albion's crew to abandon her. This gave rise to an important court case in which the judge ruled that Amity Hall's owners were responsible for her captain's actions and so liable for the loss of Albion. Amity Hall herself was wrecked the next year.

== Background ==
Amity Hall first appears in Lloyd's Register in 1789 with G. Young, master, G. Tarbutt, owner, and trade London–Jamaica. Amity Hall was probably named for Amity Hall plantation, an important sugar estate in Vere Parish, Jamaica. The ship herself was at least the second vessel by that name that Tarbutt had owned. Young had been captain of the previous Amity Hall when she was lost in 1788.

Amity Hall made three voyages to London. The dates of her arrival in London are:

Master	Arrival at London	Cleared London	Source
G. Young	30 June 1790	26 July 1790	Reports..., p. 409.
G. Young	13 July 1791	3 August 1791	Reports..., p. 411.
G. Young	28 July 1792	23 August 1792	Reports..., p. 413.

In 1793 Amity Hall's master was still G. Young and her owner was still G. Tarbutt.

== Accident and court case ==
On 26 June 1793 Amity Hall sailed from Bluefields, Jamaica, with the Jamaica fleet returning to England and under escort by the frigate HMS Proserpine, the sloops Fly and Serpent, and the troop transport Europa. Another vessel in the convoy was Albion, Mentor, master, which was on the return leg to England from bringing slaves to Jamaica from Africa, and which was now carrying 600 hogsheads of sugar. On 4 July a gale forced Amity Hall away from the fleet, but she sighted it on 5 July.

As Amity Hall was rejoining the fleet on 6 July she collided with Albion. The collision took place off Cape San Antonio, Cuba. Amity Hall rescued Albion's master and crew, who abandoned Albion. (Note: Albion did not sink but rather drifted to North America where she was salvaged and sold.)

Amity Hall arrived at London on 12 August and cleared on 10 October.

Albion's owners sued the owners of Amity Hall, arguing that the accident was the consequence of Amity Hall not following the sailing instructions for the fleet that Commodore Alms, of Proserpine, had issued. The Court found for Albion's owners. The case still appeared in a book of ruling cases over 100 years later.

== Loss ==
The Royal Gazette, Kingston Jamaica, mentioned on 19 July 1794 that Amity Hall, Blackburn, had a few days earlier drifted on to rocks when the wind failed as she was sailing out of Manchioneal harbour. The newspaper reported that it was feared that Amity Hall and her cargo would be lost. Lloyd's List later reported that she had been lost on 10 July.
