= HMS Spitfire (1793) =

History

Great Britain
- Name: HMS Spitfire
- Launched: 1793
- Acquired: By capture 1793
- Fate: Lost 1794

General characteristics
- Type: schooner
- Tons burthen: 6060/94 (bm)
- Length: 59 ft 4 in (18.1 m) (overall); 53 ft 0 in (16.2 m) (keel)
- Beam: 14 ft 8 in (4.5 m)
- Depth of hold: 5 ft 4 in (1.6 m)
- Complement: 40; later 35
- Armament: 4 × 3-pounder guns

HMS Spitfire was the French 6-gun privateer schooner Poulette, launched in 1793, that the Royal Navy captured that same year. Lieutenant John Perkins commissioned her in April. Under Perkins she was part of Commodore John Ford's squadron at Jamaica. She was lost with all hands off Saint-Domingue, Hispaniola, in February 1794.

== French privateer ==
Poulette was a privateer from an unknown home port operating in the Caribbean in 1793.

== HMS Spitfire ==
Spitfire was one of five vessels that shared in the proceeds of the capture on 17 July of the Lady Walterstasse, a Droit of Admiralty.

In September 1793 at the request of French Royalists Commodore Ford's squadron attacked Saint-Domingue and Jérémie in the Caribbean. Ford sent the frigates Penelope, Iphigenia, and Hermione, plus Spitfire, to the north side of the island where on 23 September 1793 the British captured four merchant vessels at L'Islet, and on the 29th seven at Flamande Bay. Also on the 23rd, the squadron directly under Ford captured Môle-Saint-Nicolas, where they captured amongst other vessels a schooner belonging to the French Navy named Convention Nationale; the British took her into service under her earlier name as HMS Marie Antoinette; Ford gave command of her to Perkins.

Lieutenant T.W. Rich replaced Perkins. On 12 February 1794 Spitfire capsized off Santo Domingo with the loss of her entire crew. Another account has her capsizing in the Mona Passage, off Santo Domingo, with the sloop Saucy Tom, Edmonson, master, rescuing four crew members after they had spent four hours in the water.
