= Glen Boughton =

- Suburb
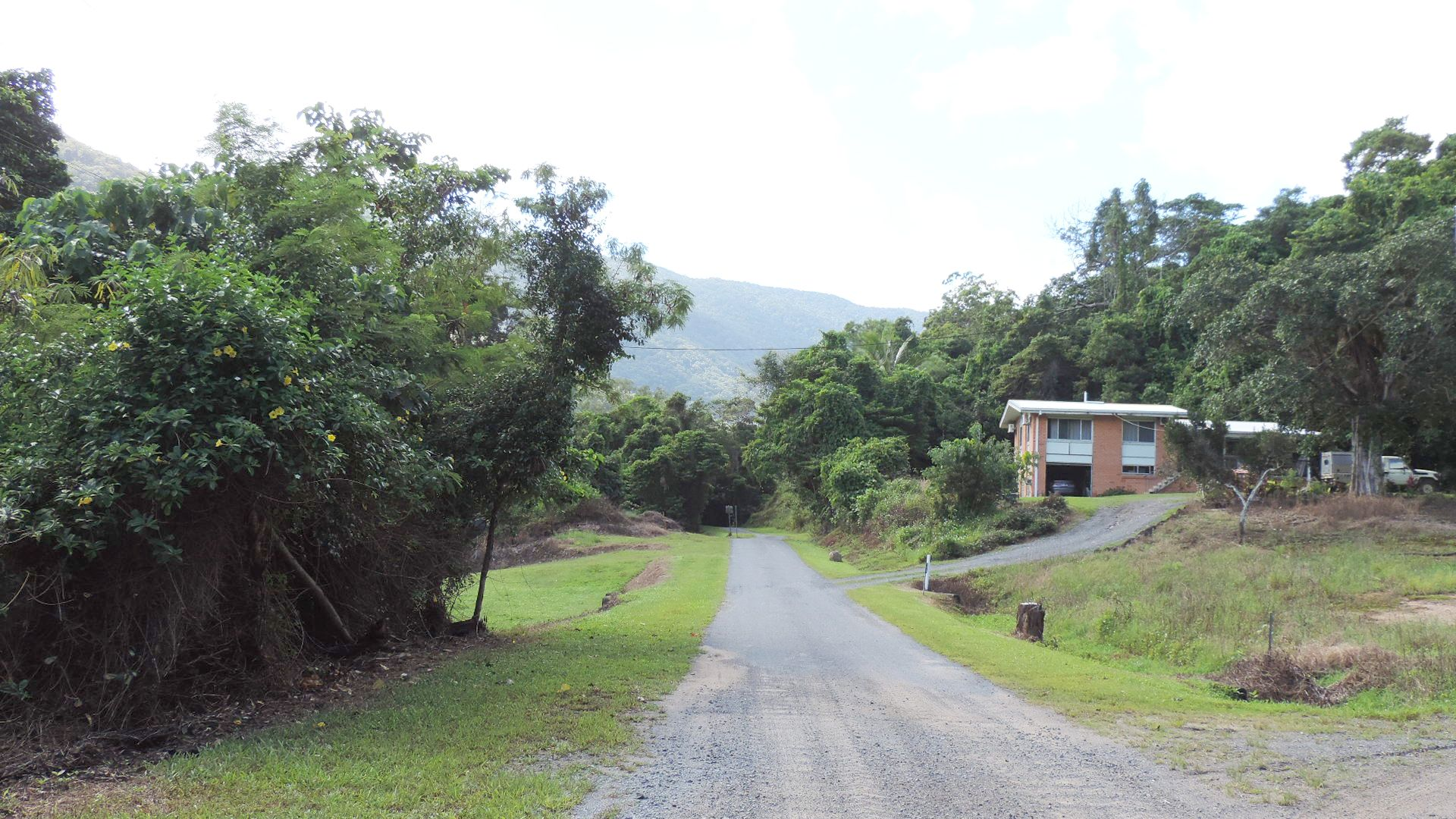
- On Hamilton Road looking east, Glen Boughton, 2018

- Interactive map of Glen Boughton
- Coordinates: 16.945°S 145.8236°E
- Country: Australia
- State: Queensland
- LGA: Cairns Region
- Location: 35.2 km (21.9 mi) SE of Cairns City; 346 km (215 mi) N of Townsville; 1,678 km (1,043 mi) NNW of Brisbane

Government
  - State electorate: Mulgrave
  - Federal division: Kennedy

Area
  - Total: 5.6 km^{2} (2.2 sq mi)

Population
  - Total: 19 (2021 census)
  - Density: 3.39/km^{2} (8.79/sq mi)
- Time zone: UTC+10:00 (AEST)
- Postcode: 4871
Suburbs around Glen Boughton
East Trinity	East Trinity	East Trinity
East Trinity	Glen Boughton	East Trinity
East Trinity	East Trinity	East Trinity

Glen Boughton is a rural locality in the Cairns Region, Queensland, Australia. In the 2021 census, Glen Boughton had a population of 19 people.

== Geography ==
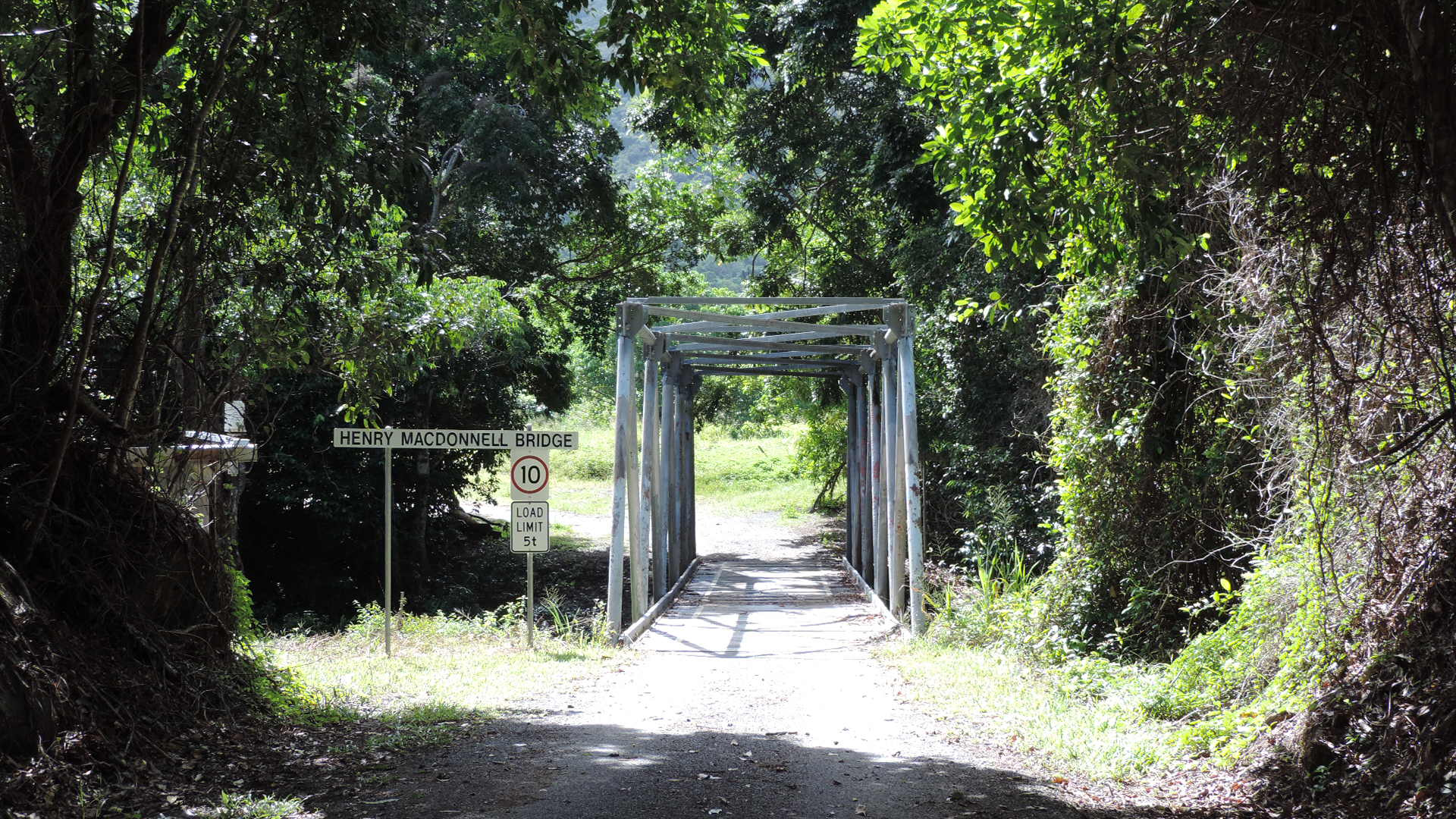
Henry MacDonnell Bridge over Hills Creek on Hamilton Road, Glen Boughton, 2018

Contrary to the Queensland Government's usual guidelines on locality boundaries, Glen Boughton is a locality entirely within another locality (East Trinity).

The locality is entirely freehold land with approximately half of it developed. The western part of the locality the land is flat (almost at sea level) and is used for farming, predominantly sugarcane. The eastern part of the locality is mountainous rising to approximately 400 metres at the eastern boundary (the Murray Prior Range); it is undeveloped land.

Hills Creek flows from east to west through the locality and after passing through East Trinity has its mouth at the Trinity Inlet.

Although Cairns City is only 5 kilometres (3.1 mi) NW from Glen Boughton, the road distance between them is 35.2 kilometres (21.9 mi) via Gordonvale as there are no bridges over the Trinity Inlet.

== History ==
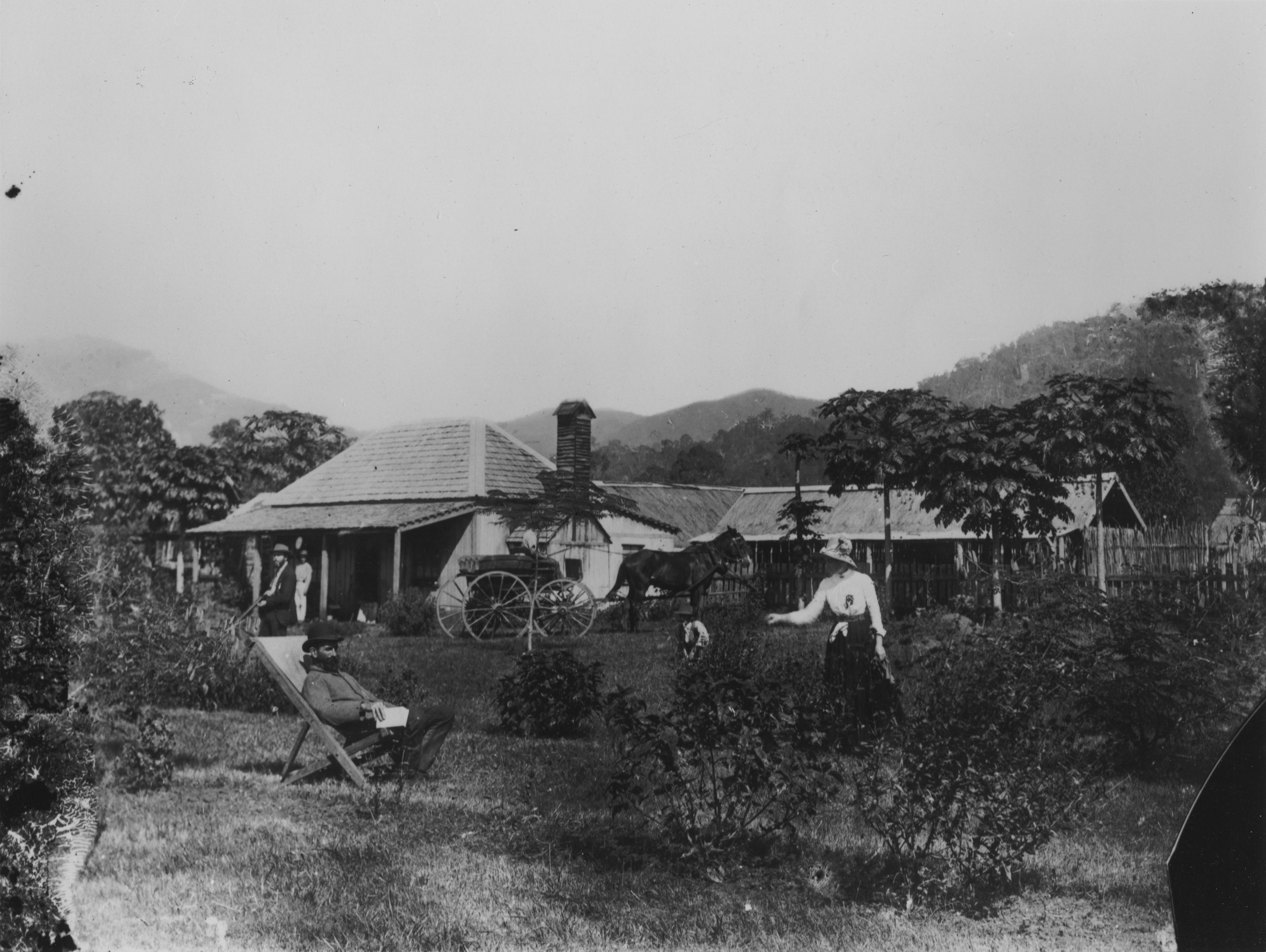
Glen Boughton dairy farm, circa 1890. The man in the deck chair may be John Hill.

By 1887, Messrs Clayton and John Hill had established a farm called Glen Boughton Estate raising cattle on cultivated grasses and were obtaining dairy cows as Cairns was experiencing increased demand for milk and butter. Their original plan was to grow sugarcane but changes in legislation about the use of Kanaka workers meant they decided to switch to dairying. In 1888 the Glen Boughton farm consisted of 110 acres (45 ha) of which 260 acres (110 ha) were cleared with 120 acres being let to a Chinese gardener. They were experimenting with various kinds of fodder crop to see which was most productive on their land. Clayton appears to have left the farm to the sole owernship of John Hill by 1900; John Hill and his wife Mary Jane continued the farm until both had died (1933 and 1948 respectively).

On 11 February 1989, the locality was established and named after the Glen Boughton Estate.

== Demographics ==
In the 2016 census, Glen Boughton had a population of 28 people.

In the 2021 census, Glen Boughton had a population of 19 people.

== Education ==
There are no schools in Glen Boughton. The nearest government primary schools are Gordonvale State School in Gordonvale to the south and Yarrabah State School in Yarrabah to the north-east. The nearest government secondary schools are Gordonvale State High School (to Year 12) in Gordonvale and Yarrabah State School (to Year 10).
