= Battle of Port-Républicain =

Part of the Haitian Revolution & the War of the First Coalition

- Part of the Haitian Revolution and the War of the First Coalition
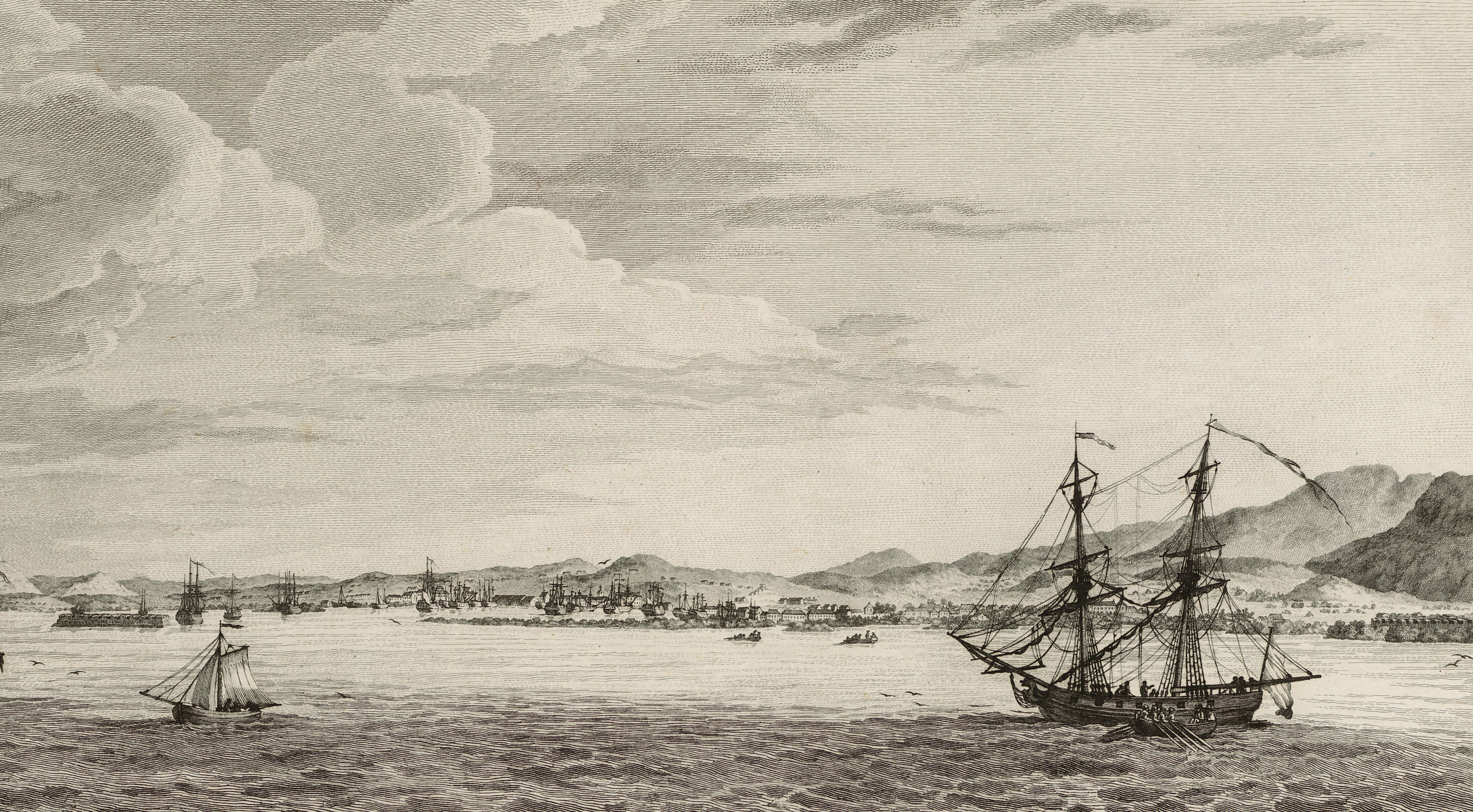
- View of Port-au-Prince, 1791
Date	30 May–5 June 1794
Location	Port-au-Prince, Haiti
Result	British victory

Belligerents
France	(Kingdom of Great Britain) Great Britain (Kingdom of France) French Royalists

Commanders and leaders
Martial Besse; Hugues Brisset de Montbrun de Pomarède; Léger-Félicité Sonthonax; Étienne Polverel	(Kingdom of Great Britain) John Whyte (Kingdom of Great Britain) John Ford

Strength
800 men 2 ships of the line Few frigates	4,000 men 4 ships of the line 3 frigates 5 corvettes and brigs 316 cannons

Casualties and losses
Unknown	8 deaths 8 wounded

The Battle of Port-Républicain took place during the Haitian Revolution (1791–1804).

== Prelude ==
On May 30, 1794, a British fleet came to anchor in Port-au-Prince bay, renamed by revolutionaries as Port-Républicain, in order to capture this city. The fleet, strong of four ships of line; HMS Europa, Belliqueux, Irresistible and Sceptre, accompanied by a few frigates, corvettes and bricks was commanded by Rear-Admiral John Ford and carried 1,465 soldiers under Brigadier-General John Whyte.

Port-Républicain had only 800 soldiers to defend itself under the command of Hugues Brisset de Montbrun de Pomarède. The latter, however, did not have the trust of Sonthonax and Polverel, so he was replaced by Martial Besse, a free Haitian.

On May 31, General Whyte sent a parliamentarian on a canoe but was pushed back near Fort Ilet, by order of the commissioners. The British began the attack, on the orders of General Whyte, two columns arrived in reinforcement to attack the city by land. The first, part of Léogâne, 1,000 strong under the orders of Baron de Montalembert; the second coming of Arcahaie, commanded by Lapointe and Hanus de Jumecourt with 1,200 men. Ships also landed the troops they were carrying; 1,465 men, including the Armée des Émigrés who have just been sent to the West Indies; the Hompesch regiment, the hussars of the Rohan regiment, and the Uhlans of Bouille.

== Battle ==
On June 1, at eleven o'clock, the frigate HMS Penelope attacked Fort Touron, while HMS Belliqueux and HMS Sceptre attack Fort Bizoton defended by soldiers of the Western Legion commanded directly by Monbrun who had five guns and two mortars. Covered by their ships 800 British soldiers commanded by Colonel Spencer disembarked at the manatee. The fighting stopped at 6 pm, following an intensive rain, however Captain Daniel at the head of 60 grenadiers walked during the night on Fort Bizoton where defectors opened the doors. Surprised Commander Montbrun was summoned to surrender by Captain Daniel, but he responded by shooting him in the head. Soon Colonel Spencer arrived in reinforcement and began the fight with the bayonet. Monbrun was wounded in the hand, and the Republicans, inferior in number, eventually stepped back on the city.

On the afternoon of June 2, 200 British soldiers commanded by Colonel Hampfield landed at La Saline and captured Fort Touron following the reversal of the garrison composed of men of the Legion of Regenerates who decided to change the camp. A part of the white population rose up in favor of the British, others fled and took refuge at Fort Joseph or on the ships. Sonthonax and Polverel finally decided to fall back on the Charbonnière four leagues from the city, denouncing the betrayal immediately. The commissioners were joined on 3 June by General Beauvais with the Western Legion, forced to evacuate Croix-des-Bouquets in the face of the British advance. Martial Basse stays in the city with the elements of the Legion of Regenerates still faithful, but many of them preferred to indulge in plunder rather than fight. The British offensive was a time stopped because of bad weather. On June 5, Lieutenant-Colonel Blaise of the Western Legion delivered Fort Joseph to the British.

Masters of forts, the British enter the city to assume control. In the evening, a French royalist, named Béranger, of the Montalembert legion, draws up a list of 30 Republican planters who were captured. He killed several of his hand at Fort Joseph, but General Whyte, informed, interrupts the massacre and condemns the responsible. The latter fled and must have drowned sometime later. According to the British bulletin, the losses of the besiegers were 8 killed and 8 wounded, including five men of the frigate HMS Hermione.

== Bibliography ==
- Madiou, Thomas (1847). Histoire d'Haïti, Tome I (in French).
