= John Ford (Royal Navy officer) =

Vice-Admiral John Ford
- Born: baptised 17 December 1738; Shropshire
- Died: 14 September 1796; Kensington
- Military career
- Allegiance: Kingdom of Great Britain
- Branch: Royal Navy
- Service years: 1753–1796
- Rank: Vice-Admiral
- Commands: Hazard; Venus; Unicorn; Brilliant; Nymphe; Polyphemus; Carnatic; Jamaica Station
- Conflicts: Seven Years' War; Action of 8 June 1755; Siege of Louisbourg; Battle of Lagos; American Revolutionary War; Capture of USS Raleigh; Action of 13 May 1779; Battle of the Chesapeake; Battle of the Saintes; French Revolutionary Wars; Battle of Port-Républicain

Vice-Admiral John Ford (fl.17 December 1738 – 14 September 1796) was a Royal Navy officer who served as Commander-in-Chief of the Jamaica Station.

== Naval career ==
Promoted to post-captain on 25 June 1773, Ford was appointed to the command of the post ship Unicorn in April 1776 in which he saw action at the capture of American frigate Raleigh in September 1778 and the action of 13 May 1779. He commissioned the sixth-rate Brilliant in July 1779 and then transferred to the command of fifth-rate Nymphe in which he saw action at the Battle of the Chesapeake in September 1781 during the American Revolutionary War and again at the Battle of the Saintes in April 1782 during the Anglo-French War.

== Haitian Revolution ==
Ford went on to become Commander-in-Chief of the Jamaica Station with his flag in the fourth-rate Europa in 1793.

During the Haitian Revolution, at the request of French Royalists he mounted a campaign against Saint-Domingue and Jérémie in the Caribbean. Ford sent the frigates Penelope, Iphigenia, and Hermione, plus the schooner Spitfire, to the north side of the island where on 23 September 1793 the British captured four merchant vessels at L'Islet, and on the 29th seven at Flamande Bay. Also on the 23rd, the squadron directly under Ford captured Môle-Saint-Nicolas, where they captured amongst other vessels a schooner belonging to the French Navy named Convention Nationale; the British took her into service under her earlier name as HMS Marie Antoinette.

Promoted to rear-admiral, Ford commanded a squadron commanded that accompanied Brigadier-General John Whyte that briefly captured Port-au-Prince in 1794. At the time some forty five vessels lay in harbour and these were all made prizes.

== Sources ==
- Colledge, J. J.; Warlow, Ben (2006) [1969]. Ships of the Royal Navy: The Complete Record of All Fighting Ships of the Royal Navy from the 15th Century to the Present (3rd Rev ed.). London: Chatham Publishing. ISBN 978-1-86176-281-8. OCLC 67375475.
- Clowes, Sir William (2003). The Royal Navy: Vol. 4: A History – From the Earliest Times to 1900. Chatham Publishing. ISBN 1-86176-013-2.
- Cundall, Frank (1915). Historic Jamaica. West India Committee.

Military offices
Preceded by Philip Affleck	Commander-in-Chief, Jamaica Station; 1793–1795	Succeeded by William Parker
