= HMS Marie Antoinette =

French 10-gun two-masted sloop

History

France
- Name: Marie Antoinette
- Namesake: Marie Antoinette, Queen of France
- Fate: Requisitioned 1793 at Saint-Domingue

France
- Name: Convention Nationale
- Acquired: By requisition 1793
- Captured: By a squadron under Commodore John Ford at Môle-Saint-Nicolas in September 1793

Great Britain
- Name: HMS Marie Antoinette
- Fate: Crew mutinied and took her to a French port in the West Indies on 27 December 1797

General characteristics
- Class & type: 10-gun schooner
- Tons burthen: French:c. 150 (French; of load); British:187 bm
- Length: French:80' (French); British:85 ft 5 in (26.04 m)
- Beam: French: 21'7" (French); British:23 ft 0 in (7.01 m)
- Propulsion: Sails
- Sail plan: Two-masted schooner
- Complement: 50
- Armament: French service: 10 × 6- and 4-pounder guns; British service: 10 × 4-pounder guns

HMS Marie Antoinette was a 10-gun two-masted sloop. She was built in France and was originally called Marie Antoinette. During the French Revolution, she was rerequisitoned and renamed Convention Nationale. A British squadron under Commodore Ford captured her in 1793. The Royal Navy took her into service under her original name, Marie Antoinette. She took part in operations around Saint-Domingue until her crew mutinied in 1797 and carried her into a French port. Her subsequent fate is unknown.

== French service ==
Marie Antoinette was the merchant schooner Marie Antoinette. In 1793, she was requisitioned at Saint-Domingue and commissioned in the French Navy as the 20-gun corvette, Convention Nationale.

== Capture and commissioning ==
In September 1793, at the request of French Royalists, Commodore Ford's squadron attacked Saint-Domingue and Jérémie in the Caribbean. On 23 September 1793, the British captured four merchant vessels at L'Islet, and on 29 September, seven at Flamande Bay. At Môle-Saint-Nicolas, on 23 September, HMS Europa, HMS Goelan, and HMS Flying Fish had captured the schooner Convention Nationale, which was under the command of Mons. Anquetin. She was registered on 12 May 1794.

Ford gave command of the renamed Marie Antoinette to Lieutenant John Perkins "an Officer of Zeal, Vigilance and Activity." In 1794 Marie Antoinette made up part of the squadron commanded by the newly promoted Rear-Admiral John Ford and accompanying Brigadier-General John Whyte that briefly captured Port-au-Prince. Records indicate that Marie Antoinette did not play any significant role in the siege. At the time some forty-five vessels lay in harbour and these were all made prizes.

In 1796 she made up part of a small squadron that captured the schooner Charlotte and brig Sally. Perkins remained with her until he was promoted master and commander into the 14-gun brig Drake in early 1797.

It is not clear who was captain of Marie Antoinette on 27 February when she impressed two seamen from the ship Fame, of New York, and under master John Ablin.

== Mutiny and fate ==
Command of Marie Antoinette passed to Lieutenant John McInerheny. On 7 July 1797 some of the crew, under the leadership of her quartermaster, a Mr. Jackson, mutinied. They murdered Lieutenant McInerheny (also M'Inerkeny or McInderhenny) and another officer by throwing them overboard, and restrained the remaining officers and loyal crew. The mutineers then took her into the French port of Gonaïves in Saint-Domingue. The British were able to capture one of the mutineers, William Jacobs; in February 1799 they hanged and gibbeted him.

The subsequent fate of Marie Antoinette and that of most of the crew is unknown. The mutiny itself is analogous to the mutiny in September of the same year by the crew of HMS Hermione. Hermione's crew also murdered their captain and took their ship into an enemy port, La Guaira in Venezuela.
