= John (1797 slave ship) =

History

Great Britain
- Name: John
- Builder: France
- Launched: 1793
- Acquired: 1797 by purchase of a prize
- Fate: Wrecked late 1806

General characteristics
- Tons burthen: 268, or 270 (bm)
- Complement: 1797: 35; 1799: 25; 1800: 20; 1800: 25; 1803: 35; 1806: 50
- Armament: 1797: 16 × 6-pounder guns; 1799: 16 × 9-pounder guns; 1800: 16 × 9-pounder guns; 1801: 18 × 9-pounder guns; 1803: 16 × 9-pounder guns; 1806: 18 × 9&12&18-pounder cannons; 1806: 10 × 9-pounder guns + 8 × 18–pounder carronades

John was launched in France in 1793, almost certainly under another name, and was taken in prize. She started trading as a West Indiaman, but then became a slave ship, making six complete voyages. She was lost in late 1806 on her seventh voyage. The slaves she was carrying were landed safely.

== Career ==
John first appeared in Lloyd's Register (LR) in 1797.

Year	Master	Owner	Trade	Source & notes
1797	W.Bell	J.Bolton	Liverpool–Demerara	LR

Captain William Bell acquired a letter of marque on 10 October 1797.

Year	Master	Owner	Trade	Source & notes
1799	W.Bell; Hensley	J.Bolton	Liverpool–Demerara; Liverpool–Africa	LR

1st slave trading voyage (1799–1800): Captain Samuel Hensley acquired a letter of marque on 12 March 1799. John sailed from Liverpool on 6 April. She acquired slaves at the Congo River, and on 4 September arrived at Demerara with 400 slaves. She sailed from Demerara on 2 February 1800 and arrived back at Liverpool on 18 March. She had left with 43 crew members and suffered five crew deaths on the voyage.

2nd slave trading voyage (1800–1801): Captain Edward Mentor acquired a letter of marque on 28 April 1800. John sailed from Liverpool on 22 May 1800, bound for the Windward Coast. She is believed to have gathered slaves on the coast between Rio Nuñez and the Assini River. Edward Mentor died on 29 September 1800. (Note: At the time of his death he was one of the most experienced captains sailing out of Liverpool in the slave trade.) On 27 January 1801 she arrived at Demerara on 3 April with 243 slaves. She left Demerara on 3 April with Fotheringham, master, and arrived back at Liverpool on 3 June. She had left with 49 crew members and had suffered five crew deaths on the voyage.

3rd slave trading voyage (1801–1802): Captain John Roach acquired a letter of marque on 2 July 1801. John sailed on 20 July. She gathered her slaves at Gallinhas and brought them to Demerara, where she arrived 18 March 1802 with 247 slaves. She arrived back at Liverpool on 3 September. She had left Liverpool with 45 crew members and suffered 12 crew deaths on the voyage.

4th slave trading voyage (1802–1803): Captain Roach sailed from Liverpool on 17 October 1802. John gathered slaves at Bonny and arrived at Havana on 22 May. She arrived back at Liverpool on 22 August. She had left Liverpool with 33 crew members and had suffered five crew deaths on her voyage.

5th slave trading voyage (1803–1804): Captain Daniel Cox acquired a letter of marque on 15 December 1803. John sailed from Liverpool for Africa on 20 December. She first stopped at Demerara and then the Bahamas, before sailing to Havana. She arrived at Havana on 15 June 1804 with 302 slaves. She left for Liverpool on 30 August and arrived at Liverpool on 10 October. She had left Liverpool with 46 crew members and suffered three crew deaths on her voyage. She returned to Liverpool with 1050 boxes of sugar, 26 bales of cotton, and 15 tons of logwood.

6th slave trading voyage (1805–1806): Captain Cox sailed from Liverpool on 3 March 1805. John. Phillips, master (late Cox), arrived at the Congo River on 25 July. She gathered slaves there and arrived at Barbados on 26 October with 267 slaves. She landed 57 there, and sailed on to Demerara, where she landed 229 slaves. She sailed from Demerara on 20 January 1806 and arrived at Liverpool on 27 March. She had left with 49 crew members and suffered 11 crew deaths on her voyage.

In late 1805 or early 1806 John's ownership changed from Bolton to Mullion & Co. She had been sold at Demerara after she had arrived there.

7th slave trading voyage (1806–Loss): Captain David Phillips acquired a letter of marque on 2 August 1806. John sailed on 27 July 1806. John, Phillips, master, arrived at the Congo River from London.

== Fate ==
Lloyd's List reported in January 1807 that John, Cumming, master, was coming from Africa when she wrecked coming into Charleston. Her people were saved. Another report stated John, Phillips, master, had gone ashore on Cumming's Flats while coming into Charleston, had bilged, and had been totally lost. Pilot boats brought the slaves ashore. She had arrived with 380 slaves.

The most comprehensive study of losses among British slave ships reports that in 1806, 33 were lost overall. Eight were lost while coming to the Americas from Africa.
