= MV Trinity Bay =

The MV Trinity Bay steaming out of Trinity Inlet.

MV Trinity Bay (formerly the South Korean registered Faesco 103) is a 1,594 gross tonnage (GT), 81 metre long, Coastal Freighter owned by the Sea Swift shipping company based in Cairns, Australia. It runs a weekly service supplying communities on the Cape York Peninsula and in Torres Strait. Formerly a Sand Dredge, the Trinity Bay was converted into the current layout during the year 2000 in Cairns Shipyards. Even though the ship is a fully commercial cargo ship, she regularly carries 40 passengers to and from Thursday Island.

The Trinity Bay also works to replenish other Sea Swift vessels, and occasionally carries CSIRO scientists to monitor the condition of the northern Great Barrier Reef.

During the wet season of 2009, the MV Trinity Bay was one of the only methods available to provide supplies of food to Cairns. 200,000 litres of fuel and 40 semi-trailer loads of food were delivered by the vessel on 6-2-2008 to supply the Coles and Woolworths supermarket chains.
