= HMS Iphigenia (1780) =

Frigate of the Royal Navy

History

Great Britain
- Name: HMS Iphigenia
- Ordered: 21 October 1778
- Builder: James Betts, Mistleythorn
- Laid down: December 1778
- Launched: 30 September 1780
- Completed: 1781
- Commissioned: 1782
- Honours and awards: Naval General Service Medal with clasp "Schiermonnikoog 12 Augt. 1799"
- Fate: Broken up in July 1811

General characteristics as built
- Class & type: 32-gun fifth-rate Amazon-class frigate (1773) frigate
- Length: 126 ft 3 in (38.48 m) (gundeck); 104 ft 1 in (31.72 m) (keel)
- Beam: 35 ft 1.75 in (10.7125 m)
- Draught: 8 ft 4 in (2.54 m) (forwards); 13 ft 0 in (3.96 m) (aft)
- Depth of hold: 12 ft 2 in (3.71 m)
- Sail plan: Full-rigged ship
- Complement: 220
- Armament: Upper deck: 26 × 12-pounder guns; QD: 4 × 6-pounder guns + 4 × 18-pounder carronades; Fc: 2 × 6-pounder guns + 2 × 18-pounder carronades

HMS Iphigenia was a 32–gun fifth-rate frigate of the Royal Navy. She was launched in 1781, and served barely 20 years when she was accidentally lost in a fire at Alexandria in 1801.

== American War of Independence ==
In 1782, Iphigenia was sent to the Jamaica station and served there for three years. In 1786, she paid off at Sheerness.

== French Revolutionary Wars ==
After returning from Jamaica station, Iphigenia served on the Milford and Irish stations in the Irish Sea. In response to the French invasion of Belgium in the War of the First Coalition, at the end of 1792, she took part in the Scheldt expedition that was foiled by ice in the estuary. While operating in the English Channel, Iphigenia captured the French privateer Elizabeth on 16 February 1793. On 25 November 1793 Iphigenia and the frigate HMS Penelope engaged and captured the French 32-gun frigate Inconstante off the coast of St. Domingo.

With the end of the coalition, Britain was left facing France alone. Through the remainder of the 1790s, the Royal Navy was the bulwark of defense against a possible Franco-Dutch invasion. By 1799, she was serving as a hospital ship at Plymouth.

In response to the French campaign in Egypt and Syria, Iphegenia was fitted out as a troopship in 1800 at Portsmouth. She sailed with the fleet to Egypt, arriving in March 1801. She landed troops at Aboukir Bay on 8 March 1801.

== Fate ==
She had been to Cyprus to fetch water and timber but on 20 July 1801, shortly after her return to Alexandria, she was discovered to be on fire. The amount of wood on her made it impossible to put the fire out. There were no casualties. Because Iphigenia served in the navy's Egyptian campaign (8 March to 8 September 1801), her officers and crew qualified for the clasp "Egypt" to the Naval General Service Medal, which the Admiralty issued in 1847 to all surviving claimants.
