= Trinity Bay (Queensland) =

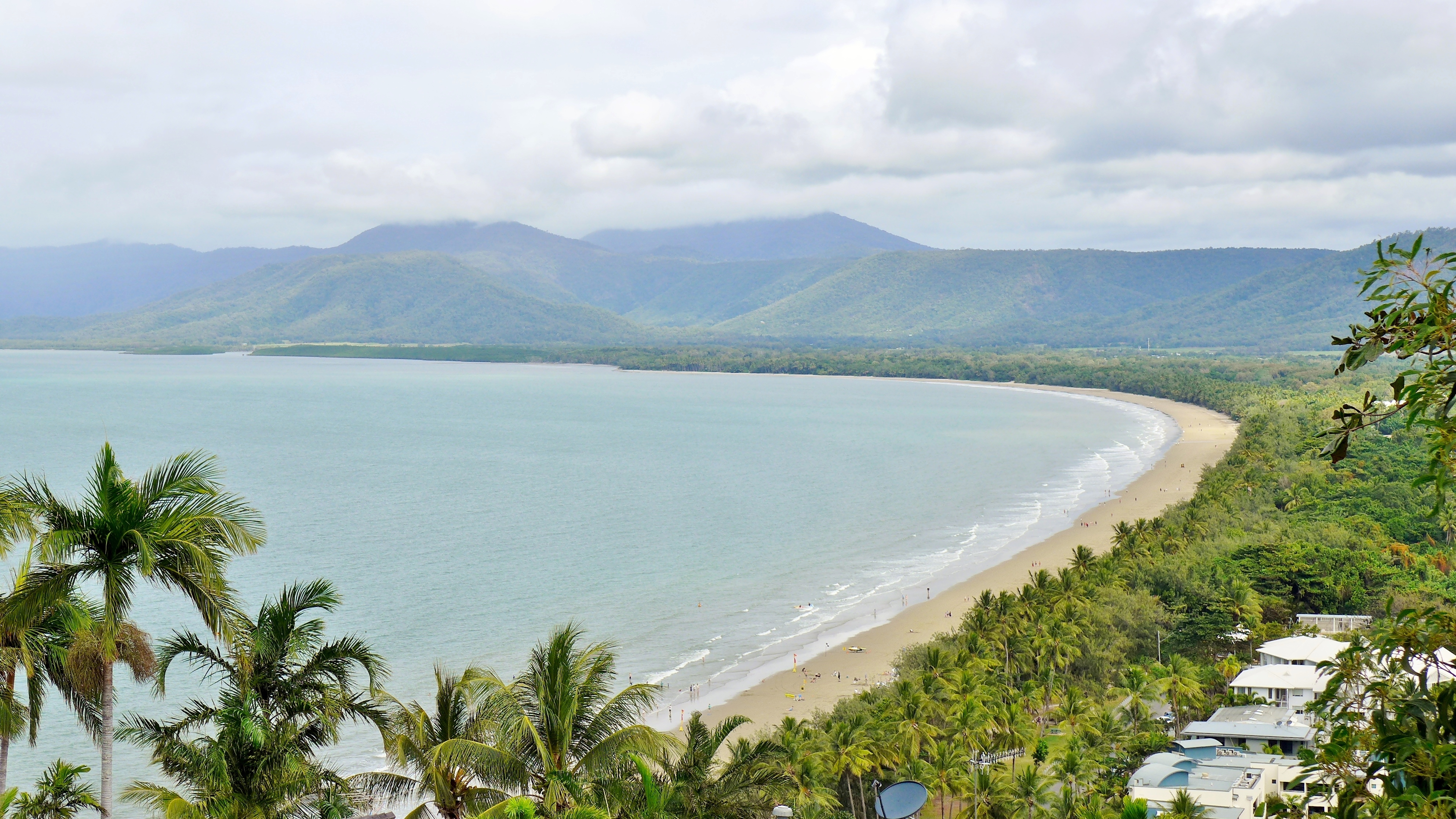
- Part of Trinity Bay near Port Douglas, 2015

- Location within Queensland
- Location: Far North Queensland
- Coordinates: 16°54′S 145°47′E
- Type: Bay
- Etymology: Trinity Sunday
- Part of: Coral Sea
- Primary inflows: Mossman River
- Basin countries: Australia

Trinity Bay is a large bay in the Coral Sea off the east coast of Far North Queensland, Australia. The Mossman River discharges into the bay. At one time the Mulgrave River also entered the bay until geological changes resulted in its mouth forming further south at Port Constantine.

The bay was named after the Christian holy day Trinity Sunday by Lieutenant James Cook on 10 June 1770.

At its southern end is the city of Cairns. Here there are extensive mangrove ecosystems which are protected by Cape Grafton. Trinity Inlet and Trinity Bay form the location for the Cairns seaport. Trinity Bay State High School is a school located in Cairns.
