= Trinity Inlet =

- The MV Trinity Bay steaming out of Trinity Inlet.

- Location in Queensland
- Location: Cairns, Queensland
- Coordinates: 16°55′12″S 145°47′04″E
- Type: Inlet
- Etymology: Trinity Sunday
- Part of: Trinity Bay
- River sources: Mulgrave River (Historical)
- Ocean/sea sources: Coral Sea, South Pacific Ocean
- Basin countries: Australia
- Settlements: Cairns

The Trinity Inlet is an oceanic inlet which serves as the port for the city of Cairns, Queensland, Australia. The city centre is on the western bank where the inlet meets the Coral Sea.

== Location and features ==
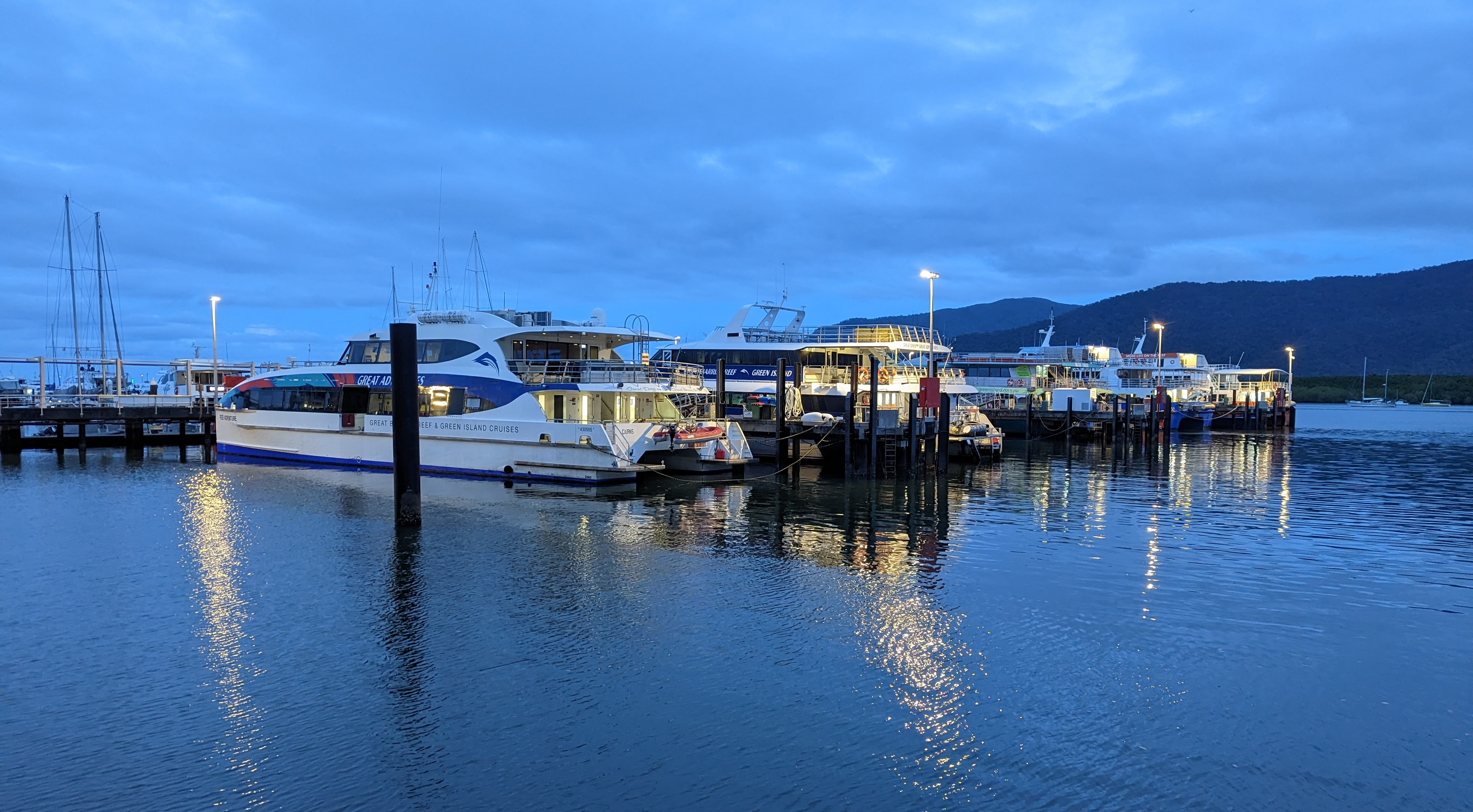
Reef excursion boats at Cairns, in Trinity Inlet

The Trinity Inlet is located in the original delta of the Mulgrave River, which since the Pleistocene flows to a mouth further south. This is because Volcanic activity which resulted in the rise of Green Hill near the Mulgrave Valley, did not block the river, as sediments from more local streams continued to build up over the volcanic rocks. The Mulgrave River enters the sea at Russell Heads, approximately 30 km south of Trinity Inlet. It is unlikely that a river would shift its course and add a further 30km to its length before entering the sea. This is because the river would then adopt a shallower gradient and lose efficiency in transporting sediment. Rivers in this region do occasionally shift course (such as the Barron River in the 1930s) but this is usually to adopt a shorter course to the sea and gain a steeper gradient otherwise known as a gradient advantage.

Trinity Inlet is lined with mangroves and mudflats. Within the inlet a large mud island has been formed and was given the name Admiralty Island. Concerns have been raised about the amount of debris and derelict shipping that exist in the upper regions of the inlet.

Commercially the inlet provides a limited deep-water berthing for the port of Cairns, allowing the export of cane sugar. The region's only tanker berth and the Royal Australian Navy base HMAS Cairns are located on the inlet. Several shipbuilders and tour operators that visit the Great Barrier Reef operate from the Reef Terminal on the entrance to the inlet.

Remnants of a levee can be found on the eastern bank opposite Cairns. This was an effort by CSR in the 1970s to cultivate sugar cane on mostly intertidal land previously occupied by mangroves and saltmarsh. This was not successful due to the disturbance of a large area of acid sulfate soil. Discharge of sulfuric acid into Trinity inlet from this land resulted in a number of fish kills. In recent years, the Queensland Government has undertaken a major remediation project to prevent the acid discharge and rehabilitate the land behind the levee.

The inlet offers shelter to small vessels when tropical cyclones threaten. A commercial saltwater crocodile farm is in operation on the upper reaches, though wild examples are still very rare in the area after hunting in the early 20th century.

This area is sacred to the Indigenous Yidinji peoples of gimuy for its rich cultural stories including (but not limited to) Kuyala the Sea Eagle.

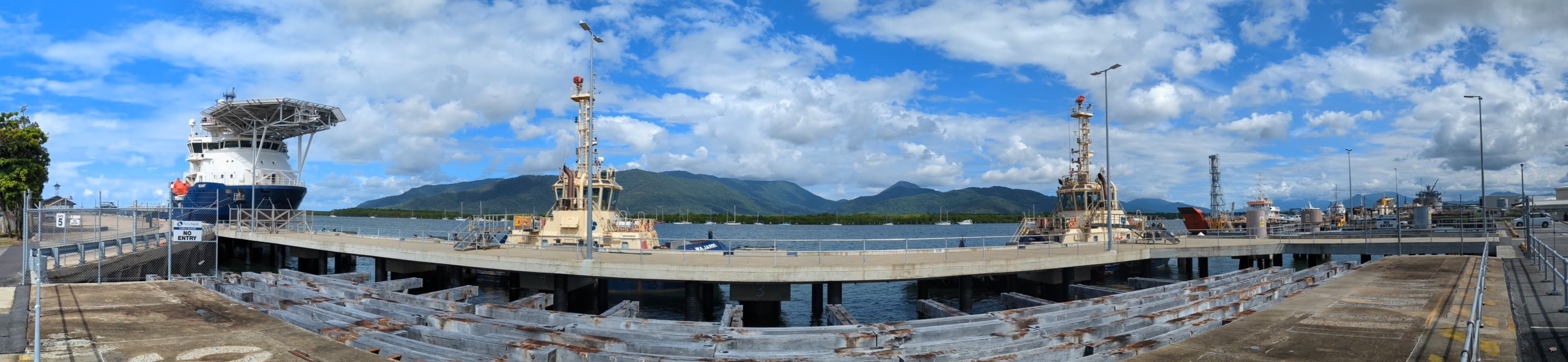
Trinity Inlet wharf 6–10 area pano with offshore supply ship Reliant (left), tug Wajarri, another tug, and tanker Largo Desert (far right)

== See also ==
- Coastline of Australia
