= HMS Europa (1783) =

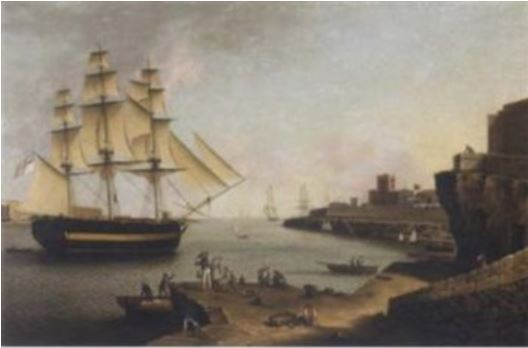
- Europa approaching Port Mahon, Minorca, by Anton Schranz

History

Great Britain
- Name: HMS Europa
- Ordered: 12 January 1778
- Builder: Woolwich Dockyard
- Laid down: 26 September 1778
- Launched: 19 April 1783
- Completed: By 10 September 1783
- Honours and awards: Naval General Service Medal with clasp "Egypt"
- Fate: Sold for breaking up on 11 August 1814

General characteristics
- Class & type: 50-gun Portland-class fourth rate
- Tons burthen: 1,046 91/94 (bm)
- Length: 145 ft 11 in (44.5 m) (overall); 119 ft 8 in (36.5 m) (keel)
- Beam: 40 ft 7 1/4 in (12.4 m)
- Depth of hold: 17 ft 5 1/2 in (5.32 m)
- Propulsion: Sails
- Sail plan: Full-rigged ship
- Complement: 350
- Armament: Lower deck: 22 × 24-pounder guns; UD: 22 × 12-pounder guns; QD: 4 × 6-pounder guns; Fc: 2 × 6-pounder guns

HMS Europa was a 50-gun fourth-rate of the Royal Navy, built by Woolwich Dockyard in 1783. Europa was based out of Jamaica, and ran aground at Montego Bay in 1785, but was not seriously damaged. When reports of the outbreak of the French Revolutionary Wars reached the British posts in Jamaica, Europa was sent into action along with the entire British squadron based at Jamaica, which consisted of several 12-pounder frigates and a number of smaller vessels, under the command of Commodore John Ford.

== Service ==
In April 1793, when the Royal Navy station in Jamaica received word of the War of the First Coalition, the naval squadron based at Jamaica, under the command of Commodore John Ford, became active. Europa served as a troop transport, and also helped capture French merchant vessels, carrying produce and supplies. On 1 June 1794, Europa assisted HMS Belliqueux, HMS Penelope, and HMS Sceptre in attacking French fortifications during the capture of Port-au-Prince, Haiti.

On 28 May, 1799, under command of James Stephenson, she was escorting a convoy in the Mediterranean.

Europa, still under the command of Stephenson, served as a troopship during the British expedition to Egypt in 1801. There she participated in the landing at Aboukir Bay, an overwhelming attack that defeated the French and led to the British capture of Cairo. Because Europa served in the navy's Egyptian campaign between 8 March 1801 and 2 September, her officers and crew qualified for the clasp "Egypt" to the Naval General Service Medal, which the Admiralty issued in 1847 to all surviving claimants.

== Fate ==
The Principal Officers and Commissioners of His Majesty's Navy offered the "Europa, of 50 guns and 1047 tons", lying at Portsmouth, for sale on 11 August 1814. The buyer had to post a bond of £3,000, with two guarantors, that they would break up the vessel within a year of purchase. Europa was sold in 1814.

== Notable crew members ==
- Joseph Whidbey – Royal Navy officer, served on the Vancouver Expedition, namesake of Whidbey Island, Washington, Joseph Whidbey State Park, also in Washington state and Whidbey Reach, Gardner Canal, British Columbia.
- George Vancouver – Royal Navy officer, commanded the 1791-95 expedition along North America's Pacific Coast. Namesake of Vancouver Island, British Columbia, Vancouver, Washington, Mount Vancouver, and Mount Vancouver (New Zealand).
- James Vashon – Royal Navy officer, served on the Vancouver Expedition, namesake of Vashon Island, Washington.
- Henry Digby – Senior Royal Navy officer, nephew of Admiral Robert Digby, notably saved the crew of HMS Boyne when it was accidentally set on fire at Spithead, Great Britain.
- Peter Puget – Royal Navy officer, namesake of the Puget Sound, which he explored. Also named after him is Puget Island, Washington state.
- Joseph Baker – Royal Navy officer, served on the Vancouver Expedition as a mapmaker and surveyor. Namesake of Mount Baker.
- John Bligh – Royal Navy officer, served during the American War of Independence and the Napoleonic Wars.
- John Cooke – Royal Navy officer, served during the American War of Independence, the French Revolutionary Wars, and the Napoleonic Wars. Killed at the Battle of Trafalgar in 1805, in hand-to-hand combat.
