= History of Cairns =

The history of Cairns in Queensland, Australia, is a transition from an important Aboriginal encampment of the Gimuy-Walubara-Yidinji and related peoples, to a port and shanty town and then to a modern city. Its evolution followed an uncertain start, which saw "dispersal" of the native inhabitants, and then competition from the newly created neighbouring community of Port Douglas. A succession of major work projects, institution establishments and direct involvement in world enterprise accelerated the settlement's development.

Frontier conflict occurred in this area between the original Aboriginal peoples and non-Indigenous peoples as early as 1872, before Cairns had been formally surveyed and gazetted in 1876. Early civic and economic milestones included constructing the Cairns-to-Herberton railway line starting in 1886, the establishment of the Cairns Harbour Board in 1906, and the official recognition of Cairns as being a city in 1923. During World War II, Cairns was heavily occupied by Allied defence forces in 1942. Post-war growth shifted toward tourism and infrastructure, marked by the construction of concrete high-rise apartments in 1981, the opening of the international airport in 1984, and the building of the Cairns Convention Centre in 1996.

== Prior to Cairns settlement ==
=== Original inhabitants ===
The Aboriginal population is believed to have entered Australia at least 60,000 years ago. Current opinion favours migration through various parts of northern Australia including Cape York Peninsula. Traditional local Aboriginal stories recall hunting and fishing on land that once extended past Green Island during a time of lower sea levels. Archaeological evidence shows Aboriginal peoples living in rainforest in the Cairns area for at least 5,100 years, and possibly for much of the often suggested 40,000-year period.

The first recorded human occupants of the Cairns area were Australian Aboriginal peoples. Local Aboriginal groups speaking the Yidinji language were generally on the south side of the Barron River. On the northern side, particularly in the coastal area from the Barron to Port Douglas, Yirrganydji groups generally spoke dialects of the Djabugay language.

Yidinji (also known as Yidinj, Yidiny, and Idindji) is an Australian Aboriginal language. Its traditional language region is within the local government areas of Cairns Region and Tablelands Region, in such localities as Cairns, Gordonvale, the southern part of the Atherton Tableland including Atherton and Kairi. The area is known in the local Yidiny language as Gimuy.

=== James Cook ===
On 10 June 1770, English maritime explorer Lieutenant James Cook visited and gave a European name to the inlet. In his journal, he commented, "The shore between Cape Grafton and Cape Tribulation forms a large but not very deep bay which I named Trinity Bay after the day – Trinity Sunday – on which it was discovered." Cook hauled his ship, the HM Bark Endeavour into Mission Bay, at the southern end of Trinity inlet between Cape Grafton and False Cape, and went ashore for a short time with Sir Joseph Banks near the present site of the Yarrabah Aboriginal community.

=== Phillip Parker King ===
Lieutenant Phillip Parker King, one of the most important early charters of Australia's coast, made three marine surveying expeditions to northern Australia in 1819, 1820, and 1821. All three expeditions included visits to Fitzroy Island, located about 22 kilometres (14 mi) from Cairns. On King's first visit, he drew attention to the availability of drinking water and the presence of Aboriginal people in the area.

=== Owen Stanley ===
In June 1848, Captain Owen Stanley undertook a ten-day hydrographic depth sounding survey of the Trinity Bay region. His consequent official map listed "Native Huts" at present-day Palm Cove, and "Many Natives" and "Native Village" on the stretch of coast immediately north. Green Island was marked "Low Bushes", and the future site of Cairns was indicated as "Shoal" and "Mangroves".

== Settlement ==
=== Assessment of site ===
The first historical event of significance leading up to the establishment of Cairns was an essay published in a Sydney newspaper in 1866. The article, by J. S. V. Mein, a ships commander appointed to set up a bêche-de-mer plant at Green Island, helped increase southern awareness of the northern location.

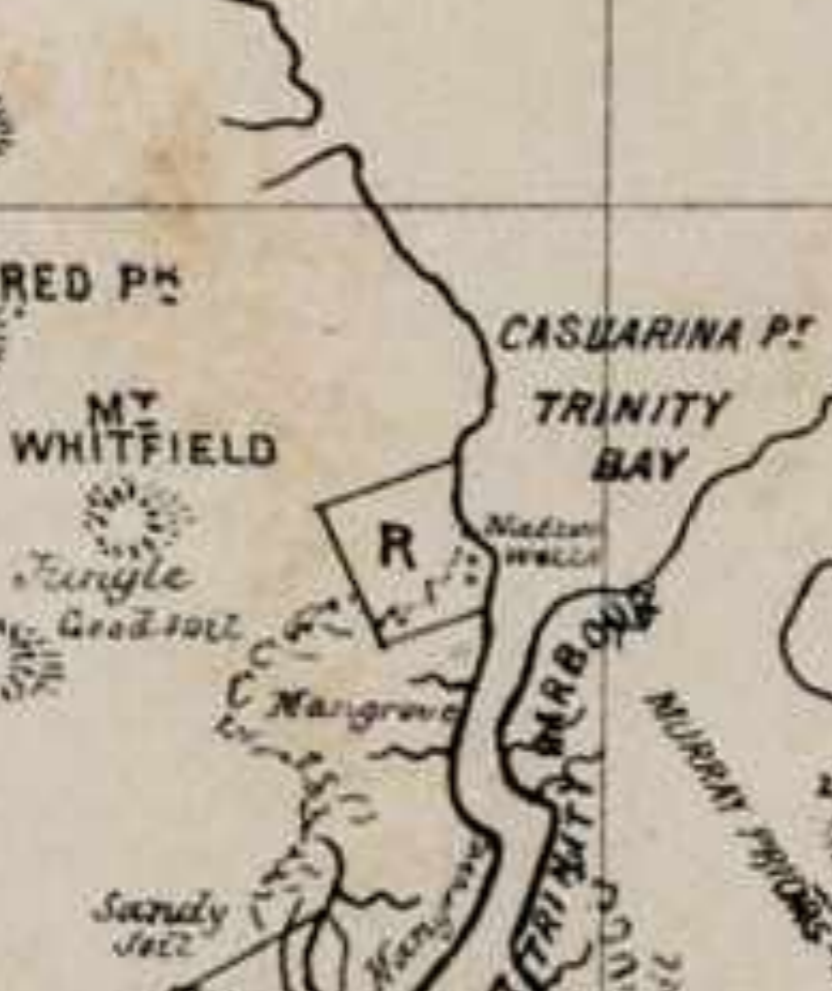
1874 map showing native wells situated within the future site of Cairns

With the arrival of the beche de mer fishermen from the late 1860s came the first semi-permanent British presence in the area. On the site of the modern-day Cairns foreshore, there was a large native well which was used by these fishermen. A violent confrontation occurred in 1872 between local Yidinji people and Phillip Garland, a beche de mer fisherman, over the use of this well. The area from this date was subsequently called Battle Camp.

In 1872, William Hann led a prospecting expedition in the Palmer River, where an extensive gold field was located. Announcement of this location in September 1873 by James Venture Mulligan resulted in an influx of prospectors, which became the basis for the first large non-indigenous populations to inhabit Far North Queensland.

In 1873, the extensive and detailed reports of the George Dalrymple exploration party indicated the assets and potential of Trinity Inlet:

The excellent anchorage and watering place appear to have been used some years since as a beech de mer fishing station and to be now a place of frequent call by vessels of that trade and passing ships. I believe very little engineering difficulty will be encountered in forming the necessary wharves on deep water and, from the appearance of the ranges, I do not anticipate any difficulty in obtaining a passable road over them to the interior.

Dalrymple also noted the number of Aboriginal groups in the area: "Many blacks were seen round the shores of the bay. Blacks camp fires burn brightly during the night in glens of the mountain sides."

In March 1876, three years after the Palmer River discovery, James Mulligan announced that an even larger and more extensive gold field had been found at the Hodgkinson River on the Atherton Tableland, 122 kilometres (76 mi) west of Trinity Inlet. This site was of sufficient size to warrant serious consideration to the building of a track to the coast, and the establishment of a coastal wharf and settlement to export the mineral. Sub-Inspector Alexander Douglas-Douglas of the Native Police led a party to cut an access track in three days, from the tableland to the coast through 32 kilometres (20 mi) of thick lawyer vine scrub. He met up with another Sub-Inspector in Robert Arthur Johnstone who was proceeding from the coast and the track was completed on 23 September 1876. It was later named the Douglas Track.

=== Official settlement ===
Around the same time, another group led by prospector William "Bill" Smith travelling from the Hodgkinson goldfields, cut an alternate route to the coast at Trinity Inlet. This was called Smith's Track and the place on the inlet where it finished was called Smith's Landing. Closer investigation by several official expeditions to Trinity Inlet established its potential for development into a port. Brinsley G. Sheridan, a police magistrate from Cardwell, surveyed the area around Smith's Landing and planned a settlement which he called Thornton. However, the coastal site of Battle Camp where the more direct Douglas Track finished became the preferable place of settlement. The first government officials arrived by boat and pitched their tents opposite the site of the present-day Pacific International hotel. On 7 October 1876, the Governor of Queensland, William Wellington Cairns, proclaimed the new northern port at Trinity Bay which was named Cairns in his honour. On 1 November 1876, the township was inaugurated at a luncheon given by Captain T. A. Lake on board the Government ship, SS Victoria. This is regarded as the official birth date of Cairns. The first public land sales in February 1877 were supplemented, three months later, by the construction of the first local saw mill making use of the abundant natural timber resources. The Smith's Landing-Thornton area later became part of the Cairns suburb of Portsmith

=== Early development ===
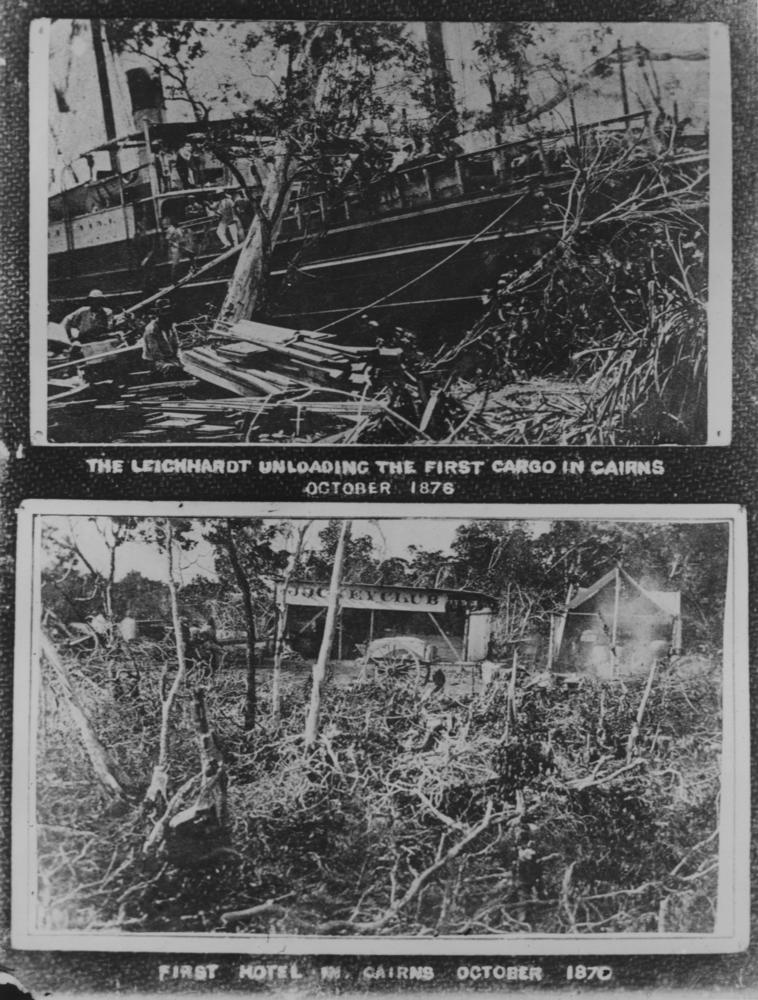
Two early photos of development in Cairns c. 1870

After five years of competition from the already established town of Port Douglas and the nearby settlement of Smithfield, Cairns became secure, with a series of successful agricultural ventures by Chinese businessmen and labourers frustrated with the overworked northern goldfields. Three Englishman, George Clayton, Thomas Hill and Thomas Swallow developed thousands of acres of crop plantations to the south and east of the Cairns settlement. By 1885, there were sufficient local population base and social organisation for the borough of Cairns to be declared a municipality and for aldermen to elect their first mayor, R. A. Kingsford.

Construction of a railway line from Cairns to Herberton in 1886 brought many immigrant workers (predominantly Italian and Irish) to the area. These new residents, in turn, generated demand for opening up land to be used for agriculture, with a predominance of sugar cane on the lowlands, and fruit and dairy on the tableland. This increased the importance of Cairns as a regional centre. Conscious of its new status, Cairns aldermen were persuaded to upgrade street lighting, considered a luxury at the time.

In April 1887 the second stage of the rail line, from Redlynch to Myola, commenced. Numerous worker settlements and hotel stores were established on the range near the fifteen tunnels used in the line's construction. The site for the village of Kuranda, the first large area at the top of the range suitable for development, was surveyed in 1888.

In 1891, the most important political figure in the early history of Cairns, A. J. Draper, became mayor – the first of seven terms in that office. Well-connected socially because of his family background, Draper's aggressive stance on issues of public importance achieved many benefits for the local community. Another important early activist was Church of England minister Ernest Gribble. Following the unexpected death of his father, Reverend John Gribble, Ernest continued his father's plans to curb the degradation of the local Aboriginal population, who were forced to exist in fringe camps after their traditional lands had been gradually appropriated by the new Cairns settlers. In December 1893, thirty Aboriginal people arrived at the Gribble outstation seeking a safe place to live, which is considered to be the unofficial foundation of the Yarrabah mission settlement.

Towards the end of the 19th century, the agricultural production of the local Chinese community had risen to tens of thousands of bushels of rice, corn, bananas and pineapples. The construction of the Cairns-Mulgrave Tramway from Cairns to Mulgrave in 1897 linked areas immediately south of Cairns to the port. A local natural gas supply company was established in 1899, increasing the domestic comfort of residents. In 1900, the importance of preserving the natural environment around the Barron Falls was recognised, and 30 square kilometres (7,400 acres) were gazetted by the Government as a national park.

== Cairns township ==
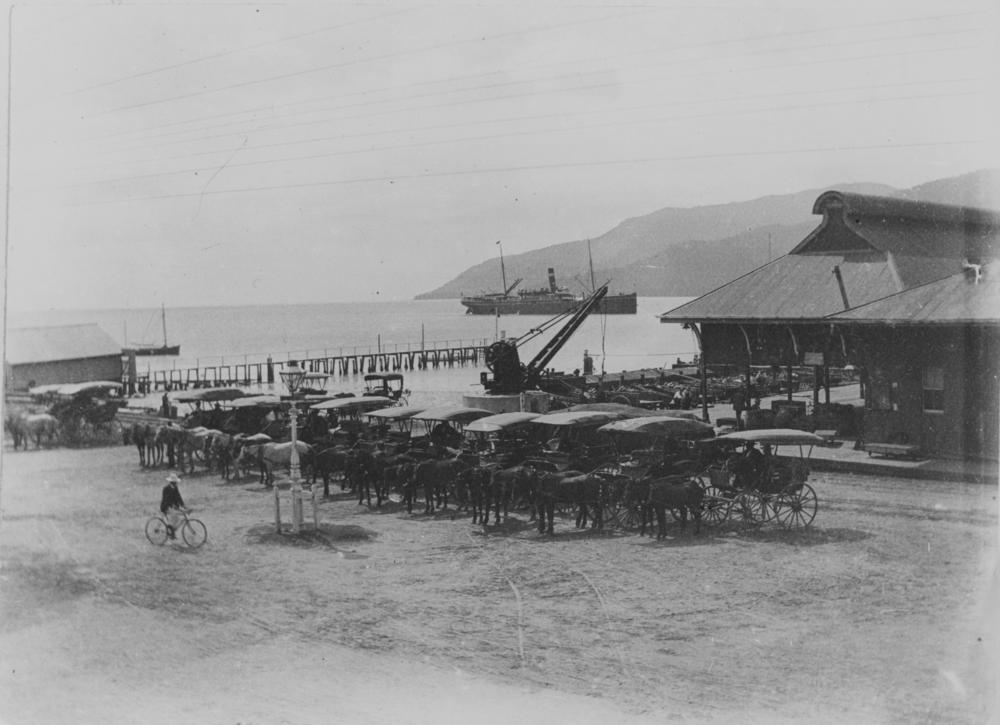
Horsedrawn cabs on Cairns wharf, c. 1912

In 1903, Cairns was officially declared a town, with a registered population of 3,500. In the same year, the memoirs of R. A. Johnstone were first published in the Brisbane-based Queenslander newspaper. These memoirs, later collectively published under the title, Spinifex and Wattle, were significant because of the details given of many Aboriginal customs observed by Johnstone in the Trinity Bay and Barron River area during the Dalrymple expeditions of 1872–1873. After intense public debate, a local harbour board was established in 1906. A rapid increase in architectural creativity followed, with construction of many buildings that are now heritage listed, including the Bolands Centre, St Monica's school, Central Hotel, Adelaide Shipping offices, and the Burns Philp (Cairns International Hotel) building.

In 1909, The Cairns Post newspaper commenced publication, with a publishing schedule of six days per week, which continues to the present day. (An earlier unrelated paper also called The Cairns Post was published between 17 May 1883 and 20 May 1893.)

The town's first water supply opened in 1911, and was described in the local press as "a valuable aid to sanitation." In July 1912, the brick and timber Cairns District Hospital was opened, which helped foster the town's self-reliance to cope with medical emergency, particularly in a tropical environment. The two-storey building, located on the esplanade, had taken two years to construct. It replaced an earlier basic bungalow-style hospital, in which the office had at times also served as an operating theatre.

The early 1900s also saw the development of Malay Town around Alligator Creek; a centre for the area's first migrants.

== Cairns city ==
=== Post-WWI development ===
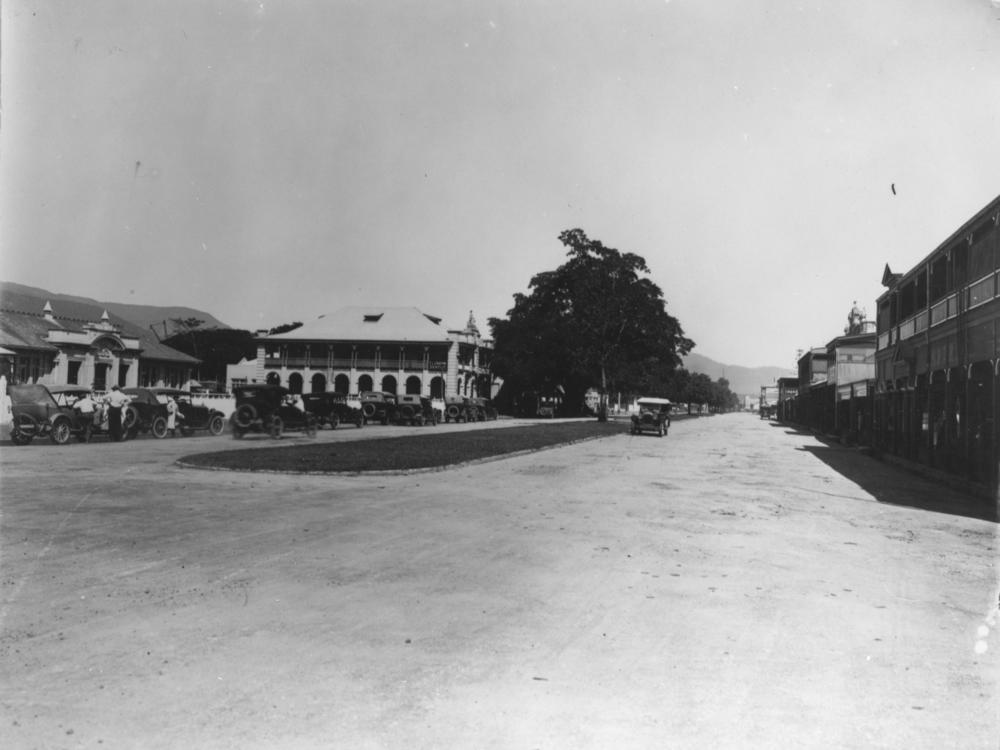
Abbott Street, Cairns, c. 1925

World War I resulted in many labour and consumer good shortages for the physically isolated Cairns population. A period of reconstruction and quiet growth followed World War I. On 12 October 1923, the Government granted approval for Cairns to be listed as a city.

The opening in 1924 of the Daradgee Bridge outside Innisfail further strengthened connections between Cairns and the rest of Australia. In 1925, a public electricity supply was introduced, and the Cairns High School and Technical College was opened. In 1926, The Cairns Post commemorated the settlement's 50th birthday by publishing a 50-page, large-format historical essay and photo supplement.

In 1927, Cairns suffered widespread destruction from Cyclone Willis. The extensive 33-year-old East Trinity dairying, timber and agricultural estate of Glen Boughton, located directly across the inlet from Cairns City, never recovered from its losses. The city's first Council Chambers was opened in 1930. Sir Charles Kingsford Smith, aviation pioneer and grandson of Cairns' first mayor, made an aerial visit in 1932.

The South American cane toad was introduced to sugar cane fields to the south of Cairns in early 1935 to assist in the control of the cane beetle. The toxic animal developed into one of the worst feral pests in Australia's history, resulting in ecological disaster to many native species. In November of the same year, the Barron Falls Hydro Electricity scheme began to provide power for an era of major industrial expansion.

The city's first commercial radio station, 4CA, becoming operational in 1936, reducing the feeling of isolation during the wet season. In the same year, the former inner-city red-light district of Sachs Street, a name regarded as an embarrassing coincidence to respectable Cairns citizens, had a name change to Grafton Street. Heavy rain associated with a cyclone early in 1939 caused substantial flooding on the Barron River. The floods resulted in the river changing its course, and the mouth of the Barron moved north from Casuarina Point on the northern Cairns esplanade to Ellie Point.

=== World War II ===
The outbreak of World War II in 1939 increased demand for a suitable road to the tableland via Kuranda, as an emergency evacuation route in the event of hostile invasion. This road, which took 18 months to construct with a single bulldozer, opened June 1942.

During the 1942 Pacific phase of World War II, Cairns was used by the Allied Forces; in particular, the United States stationed troops throughout the region to supply the Pacific fleet. The fall of Singapore precipitated a mass evacuation of local residents to the south. Many homes were sold cheaply, and a year later the local population had been reduced by nearly 7000 people. Despite the end of the conflict in 1945, many who left never returned. Between 1943 and 1946, the Australian Army undertook extensive anti-malaria drug experimentation. This work cleared Cairns of many mosquito breeding grounds, the source of numerous fever outbreaks, and contributed significantly to the knowledge, control, and treatment of tropical insect-borne infectious diseases.

=== Post-WWII recovery ===
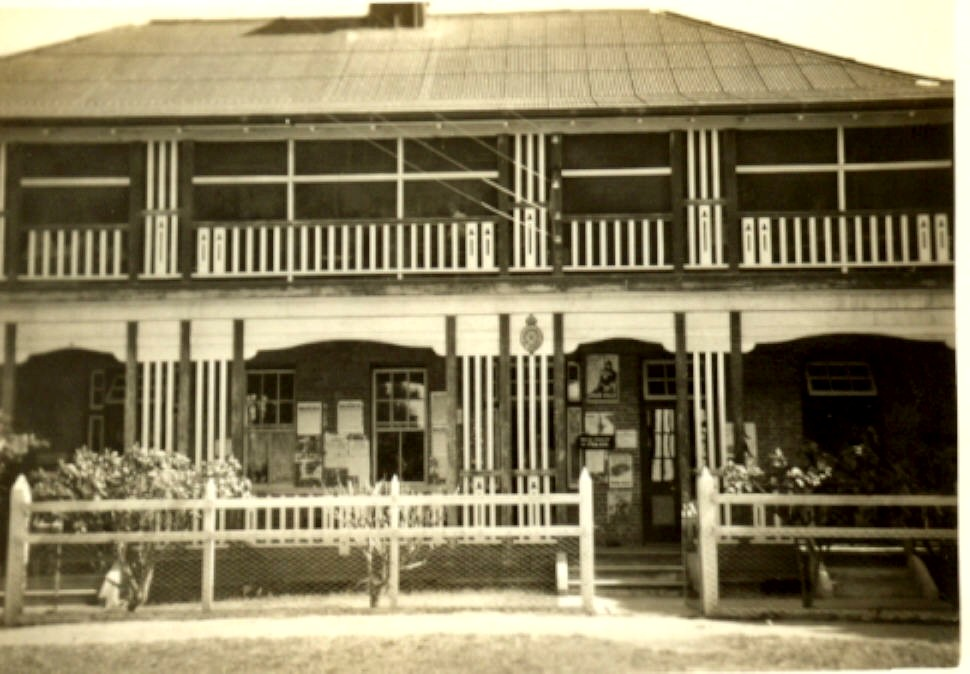
Cairns Police Station, 1948. Note the station badge above and to the left of the entry.

A two-week series of auctions of ex-army equipment in August 1946 attracted buyers from throughout Australia who were anxious to boost depleted stocks of various goods, from textiles to building equipment. In September 1947, the corvette HMAS Warrnambool was badly damaged when it collided with a sea mine, killing three crewmen, and injuring 86 others. This highlighted the danger posed by the mines; by 1948, the official minesweeping flotilla disbanded, after having collected over 2000 mines and cleared the shipping lanes for normal traffic.

In 1949, long-time Cairns Mayor, William Collins, was defeated at local council elections by Australian Labor Party candidate W. H. Murchison, ending Collins' record 22 years in office. Further enhancing accessibility to Cairns, a second plane service, Trans Australia Airlines, joined passenger carrier, Australian National Airways, for regular domestic flights in 1949.

A second radio station, ABC 4QY, began broadcasting in 1950. In an effort to re-establish local industry and to reach a broader market for tableland fruit crops, a tropical fruit cannery, Amberglow, was opened in December 1950. Located in the Smiths Creek area, in a former navy store with a floor space of 9,100 metres (29,900 ft), the cannery was initially successful, but succumbed to financial problems and closed in 1957. Dredging of the harbour, having been suspended during the war, was resumed in the 1950s.

In September 1951, Cairns' second hospital, the Calvary Hospital, opened. It was operated by a Catholic nursing order, the Sisters of the Little Company of Mary. In October, the city's 75th anniversary, Back to Cairns celebrations generated a new sense of pride in local accomplishment. A large parade, with more than 100 floats, depicted the historical and industrial achievements of Cairns and the surrounding district over the previous 75 years.

=== Cultural expansion ===
Several years of significant advancement followed for tourist facilities and publicity, starting with the 1953 release of There's A Future For You in Far North Queensland, an 8 mm film produced by Cairns printer, Bob Bolton. This locally funded film was well received by audiences, and was later shown for many years in London at the British Office of Immigration. Starting in June 1953, the weekly arrival of an air-conditioned tourist train, The Sunlander, from Brisbane, encouraged vacationers from the south.

Queen Elizabeth’s visit to Cairns in March 1954 was enthusiastically attended by an estimated 40,000 people, twice the official population, showing their loyalty to the British monarch. Scenes of Cairns that featured extensively in the official film of the Queen's visit to Australia increased international awareness of the district. Coinciding with the release of the royal tour movie, Bob Bolton released the first North Queensland tourist information guide, Displaying North Queensland in General and the Mulgrave Shire in Particular. In October 1954, the city's water supply was boosted by the addition of the Behana Creek intake. In May 1955, the arrival of the Italian migrant worker ship, Flaminia, brought European influences and culture, and a new generation of much-needed farming families. In August, a modern steel-framed railway station replaced the previous badly degraded wood and rusting iron structure.

In 1956, Cairns was hit by Cyclone Agnes, with winds of 110 kilometres per hour (68 mph). Although considerable damage was done to vegetation and property, the effect was greatly lessened by it being a 'dry' cyclone with little or no rain.

Towards the end of the year, the 16th Olympic games were held in Melbourne, Australia. In November, the Olympic torch arrived in Cairns from Darwin, and was carried first by an Australian-born Greek, Constantine Verevis, and then by Anthony Mark, a north Queensland runner especially chosen to represent the Aboriginal people of Australia.

Parts of a Cinerama movie, Cinerama South Seas, were filmed in Cairns in 1957. This three-screen colour movie revisited the places seen by James Cook during his southern-hemisphere maritime voyages 187 years before. The showing of a Cinerama documentary film was regarded as a major boost for the tourist trade of any region depicted.

=== Infrastructure improvements ===
In 1958, the Cairns Council embarked on a much-needed sewering of the entire city, providing the basic plumbing infrastructure for future development. In September 1958, Government horticulturist S. E. Stephens and a small team of volunteers created the Cairns Historical Society, with the aim of encouraging the collecting and sharing of Cairns' history. An official tourist area was declared within the area bounded by Trinity Bay, Casuarina Point, Green Island, and Ellis Beach on 4 August 1960; the 1962 opening of a new Green Island jetty was established as the first annual Cairns Tourist Festival, and renamed Fun in the Sun the following year.

In December 1962, an all-weather radar and cyclone-warning station was opened at Saddle Mountain, near Kuranda, operated by remote-control from Cairns Airport. The station was recognised as a necessity to provide coverage of a 25-degree blind spot in the Townsville section of the Queensland Coast warning system after an unpredicted 1958 cyclone inflicted extensive damage to the town of Bowen. In 1963, the Barron Gorge Hydroelectric Power Station came online, and was linked to Townsville and Mackay via the Northern Power Grid, greatly increasing the available electrical supply for domestic and industrial requirements. A bulk sugar terminal was opened on the Cairns waterfront in October 1964, ensuring that the region's sugar industry would not be neglected.

=== Continued growth ===
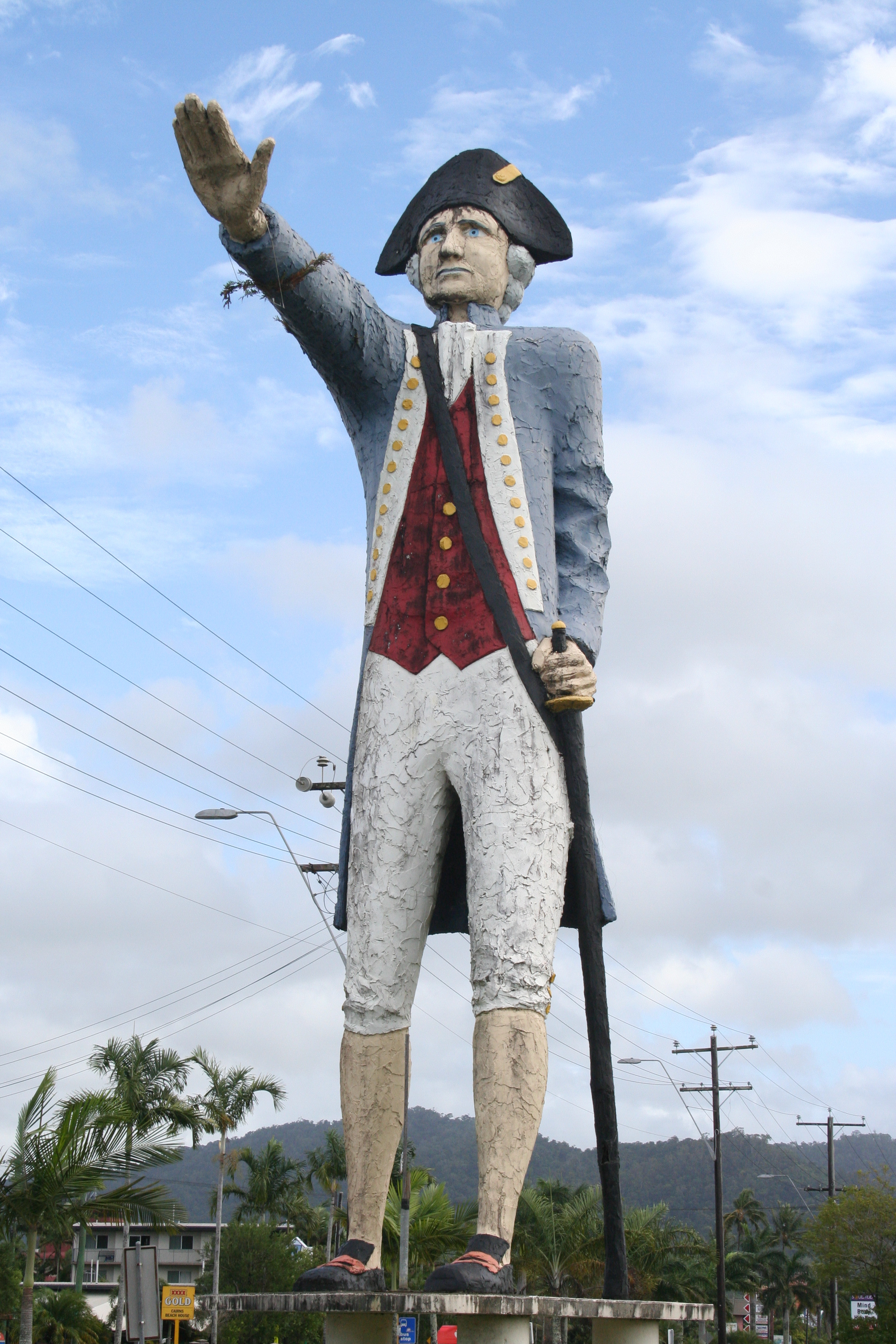
The statue of Captain Cook outside the Captain Cook Motel emulates a work by E. Phillips Fox

The release of the first issue of printer Bob Bolton's glossy large-format colour tourism magazine, The North Queensland Annual, in 1966 was a major advance for promoting the local area. Later that same year, the first local television stations started broadcasting – ABC 9 in July, and FNQ 10 in September. In October, publication began of the city's first independent newspaper since the 1930s, The Northerner, which continued until April 1968.

In 1969, Percy Trezise published a much-acclaimed book about the Quinkan Aboriginal cave paintings of Cape York Peninsula in 1969. As a result, these ancient paintings, long known to Cape residents, soon became a subject of much discussion throughout Australia and internationally.

In 1970, the City Council became the first local council in Queensland to take possession of a Burroughs mainframe computer the size of a large domestic freezer and with "a memory capacity of 200 words".

In 1972, a group of young people started a hippie colony at Weir Road, Kuranda near Barron Falls National Park after earlier attempts at Holloways Beach in 1967–71. The commune lasted only a few years before it was abandoned, with some determined individuals setting up splinter colonies at more isolated North Queensland areas, including Cedar Bay National Park, from which they were later evicted. Some members of the Weir Road community later rejoined society and became local tourism personalities. In October 1972 the new Captain Cook motel, notable for its colossal and controversial statue of Captain Cook, started daily advertising. Construction of the statue was unwittingly approved by the Council because an officer did not realise its proposed height had been provided in metric units, rather than imperial feet and inches.

The Royal Australian Navy had a presence in Cairns, operating a Patrol Boat Facility from a warehouse in Grafton Street, under the satellite command of HMAS Penguin in Sydney. Initially, Lieutenant Shaw was Senior Naval Officer and in 1971 Lieutenant Commander Geoff Burrell took over. In 1973, it was commissioned as HMAS Cairns under the command of Commander Jim Yates and Executive Officer Lieutenant Commander Geoff Burrell. A new base was constructed, which remains in operation. The old naval wharf became the construction site of Trinity Wharf.

The long-awaited Cairns Civic Center was officially opened by Australian Prime Minister Gough Whitlam on 31 May 1974. In his address, Mr Whitlam stated that Cairns was in a unique position to absorb ideas and styles from three cultures – European, Aboriginal, and Torres Strait Islander. In February 1975, local identity, Emrys "Rusty" Rees, took over a loosely structured 'hippie' market that had been operating in various locations since late 1974, and founded Rusty's Markets on the previous site of Chinese produce markets operated in the 1800s.

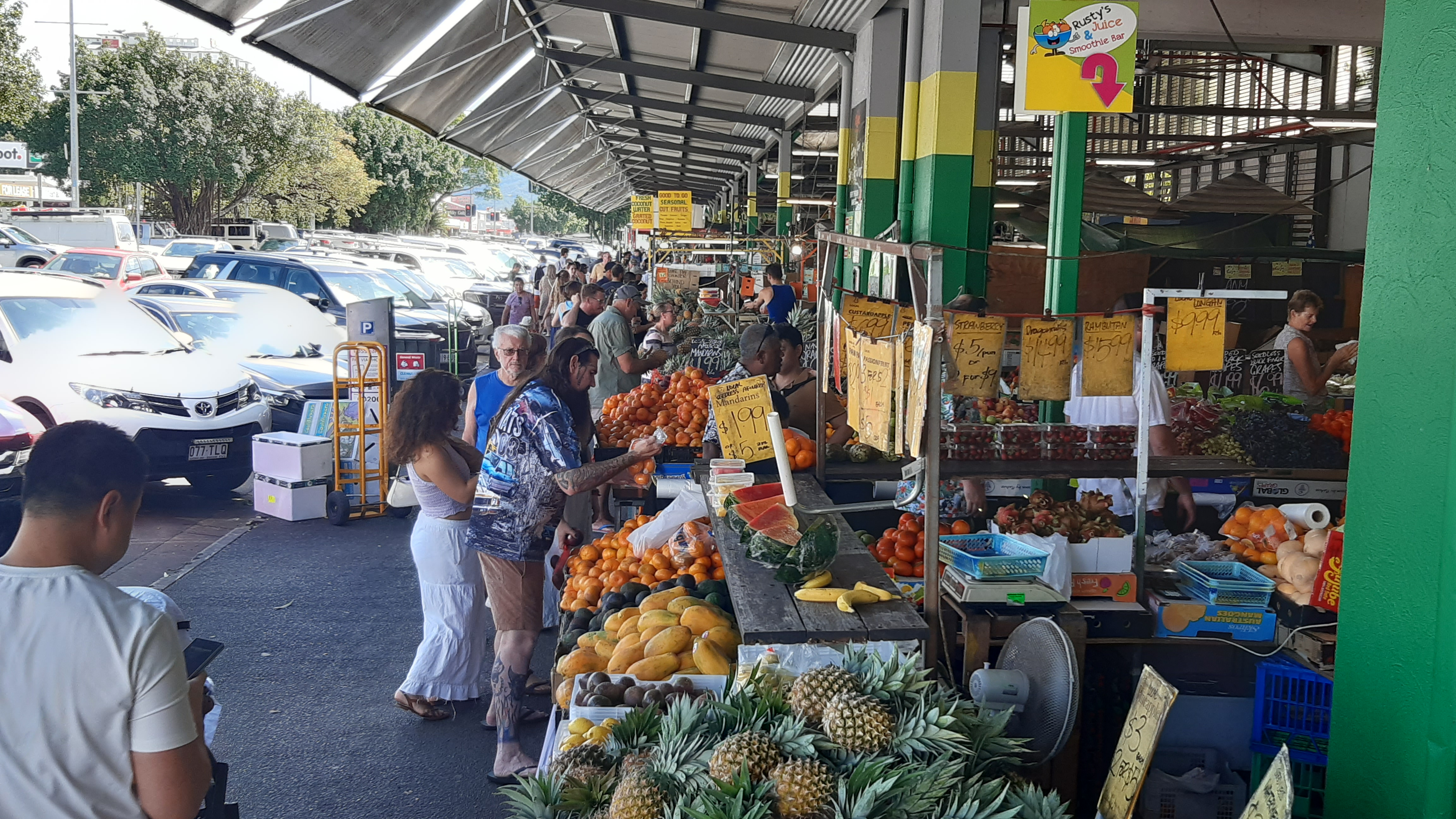
Rusty's Markets, Cairns in 2025

1976 saw the commencement of supply from Copperlode Falls Dam, providing the extra water needed for a projected rapid increase in population. Later that same year, the 100th anniversary of the founding of Cairns was celebrated with various public events. Dorothy Jones published the book, Trinity Phoenix, regarded as the first serious comprehensive history of Cairns.

Construction of two modern bridges at Stratford and Kamerunga, in 1977 and 1980 respectively, helped alleviate serious traffic disruption between Cairns and the Northern Beaches during the wet season when the Barron River's lengthy Tableland catchment area is inundated. In 1979, the Cairns public library opened. The opening of Ruth's Women's Shelter second-hand book shop in November 1980 was a practical way to provide a vital independent community service. Staffed by volunteers, and relying on the sale of donated stock, the shelter provided funds for setting up and running a women and children's crises accommodation shelter.

=== Modernisation ===
A major step in the modernisation of Cairns was the construction of four modern high-rise apartment and hotel complex buildings between 1981 and 1983. Although regarded by some builders as not desirable or possible for the Cairns environment, such architecture heralded the start of the local high rise era. During this period the Queensland Government decided to issue two casino licences, one for the north of the state and one for the south. There were three major applications from developers in Cairns; the biggest involved reclamation work to create an artificial peninsula from the Esplanade for a marina, which was costed at $300 million. The majority in Cairns opposed these proposals, and demonstrated on the mudflats of Cairns Esplanade, led by the Mayor of Cairns, Keith Goodwin. The Government chose Townsville's proposal of $35 million from the Thiess Group for the construction of Jupiter's Townsville Casino.

Much media attention was given to prolonged conflict with protesters in December 1983 when bulldozers cut a track for a road through Cape Tribulation rainforest, and in August 1984 when construction of the actual road commenced. The controversial road was opened in October 1984. Of major long-term benefit to Cairns was the opening of Cairns International Airport in 1984, giving international travellers the opportunity of direct access to Cairns and the surrounding region.

The 1987 founding of the Tjapukai Dance Theatre in Kuranda had far-reaching benefits for the commercial tourism potential of Cairns, and the cultural pride of the local indigenous population. The same year, and also at Kuranda, a butterfly sanctuary, later named by the Guinness Book of Records as the largest on Earth, commenced public operation.

Two events in 1988 increased Cairns' reputation as an area of natural beauty and scientific interest. In February, a lengthy boardwalk through the mangrove swamps on the approach to Cairns airport was opened, allowing visitors to comfortably experience the natural environment that surrounded the first Aboriginal and European settlers. In December, wet tropical rainforest between Cooktown and Townsville was included on the World Heritage list.

Sugarworld Waterpark was developed by Colonial sugar Refineries (CSR) and was originally built at Hambledon Estate. Its official opening was held on 9 September 1989. Contained within the park is Swallow Park and is named after Thomas Swallow who is considered to be 'the father of the cairns district'. In 1995, the land and waterslide facilities became the property of the Cairns City Council. In the current day, the land is leased and operated and maintained by a privateer.

In 1990, the city's mail sorting facilities and central post office boxes were relocated. In 1992, a new multi-story courthouse and police station were built, at a cost of $46.5 million, to cater for the legal needs of the rapidly expanding North Queensland population. Early in 1993, local chiropractor Harald Falge created the Street Level Youth Care organisation, run by volunteers to assist the homeless with food, blankets, and other needs.

In 1994, construction began for the 7.5 km (4.7 mi) Sky Rail scenic cableway from Cairns to Kuranda over World Heritage rainforest, which opened in 1995, further promoting ecotourism in the region. In 1995, the Mulgrave Shire and Cairns City councils amalgamated to form the present-day City of Cairns. In the same year, a $1.5 million Art Gallery and Cairns' first public Internet café were opened. and, James Cook University officially opened a campus at Smithfield.

The opening of the 100,000 square metres (25 acres) $8.8 million Tjapukai Aboriginal Cultural Park in July 1996 helped promote education and understanding of Australian Aboriginal culture in a society that had largely ignored the history of its original inhabitants. The theme park received many Australian and international awards, indicating ongoing recognition of the achievement. Tjapukai closed down in January 2021. Commencement of construction of the Cairns Convention Centre in the same month was an important development towards catering for modern corporate events. The centre's first major conference, in 2000, was presented by the software giant, Microsoft. At the suggestion of the Cairns City Council, an annual Reef Festival was first held in October 1996, combining the resources and publicity of the city's major festival, Fun in the Sun, with the increasing number of other minor festivals, resulting in stronger co-operation and integration of the community and its resources.

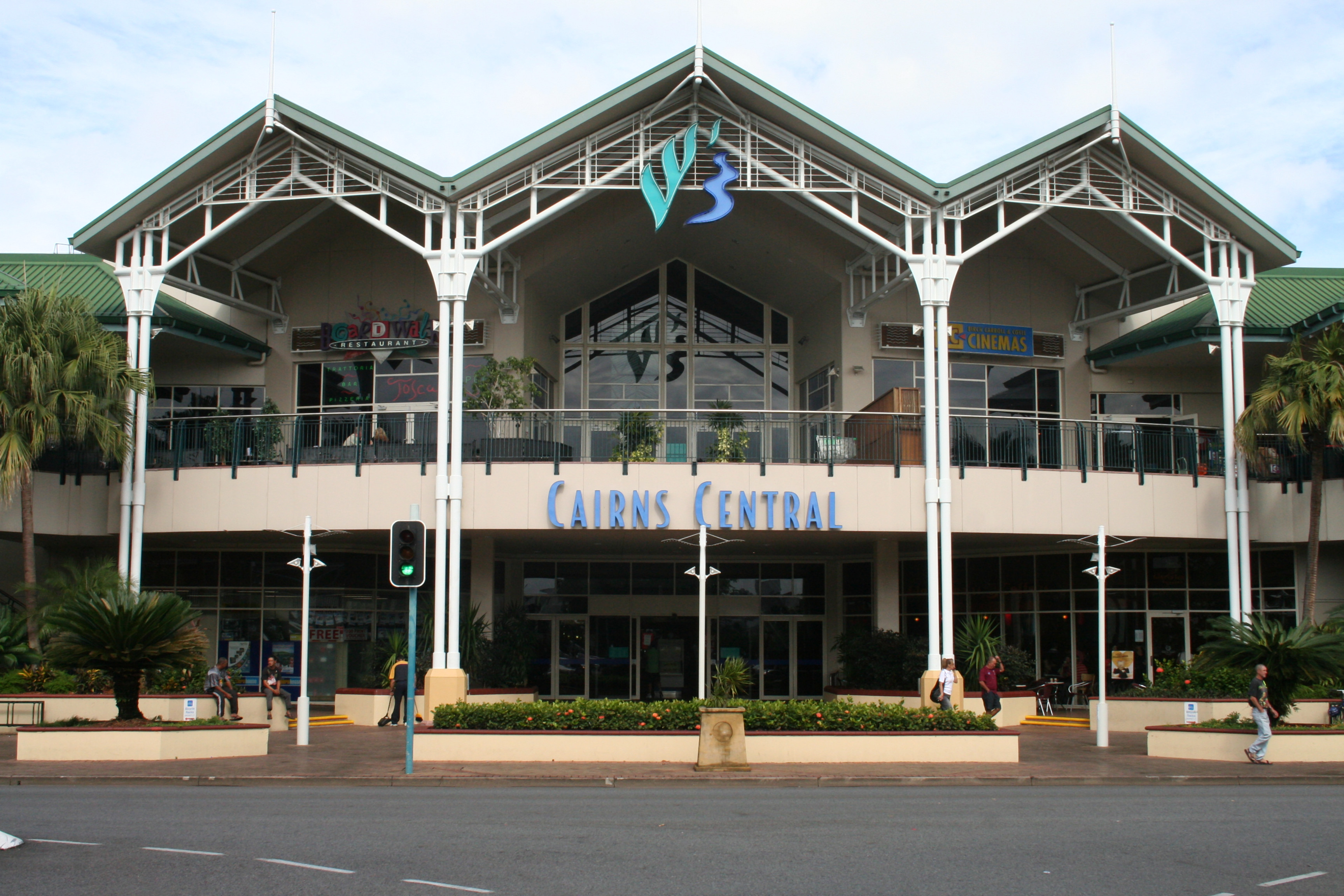
Cairns Central viewed from its main entrance on Shields Street.

In May 1996 the old bricked Cairns Railway Station (built in 1960) was demolished, and the site was redeveloped into Cairns Central Shopping Centre, incorporating the new railway station. A new Cairns City Council Chambers was opened in 1998, and the City Library moved into a refurbished version of the previous Council Chambers building in 1999.

In May 2000, a decade-long battle ended between the Queensland State Government and private developer, Sailfox, which had planned to build a $1.2 billion resort on East Trinity, across Trinity Inlet from Cairns City. The dispute was resolved when the land was bought for the state. In June 2000, Australia was once again the host of the Olympic Games. During the North Queensland section of the Olympic torch relay, extensive worldwide television and print media attention was given to the carrying of the 27th Olympic torch on a Skyrail cable car by Djabugay Aboriginal elder Martha "Cookie" Brim, and then underwater over the Great Barrier Reef by Australian marine biologist Wendy Craig Duncan.

=== 21st century Cairns ===
2002 saw the inauguration of the annual Cairns Festival. This incorporated the activities of the previous Reef and Dive festivals. In March 2003, a public swimming lagoon and Esplanade foreshore boardwalk and redevelopment were officially given to the public, allowing Cairns City a small area of white sandy beach.

In 2004, the Cairns Convention Centre was named the world's best congress center by the annual general assembly of the International Association of Congress Centers. In the same year, the local Djabugay rainforest Aboriginal group were given native title over Barron Gorge National Park, the first such claim to be recognised in Queensland, and the first in Australia to be granted out of court. In 2005, the Japanese company, Daikyo, withdrew its operations from North Queensland because of economic problems elsewhere in the organisation. This departure ended 17 years of major tourism investment in the Cairns area, including a $30 million upgrade of facilities at Green Island.

On 24 April 2006, the Yarrabah-based Mandingalbay Yidinji people became the second Aboriginal clan in Queensland, after the Djabugay group, to win recognition of their traditional lands. This recognition by the Australian Government took 12 years to be approved, and was made 236 years after British explorer Captain James Cook made a brief visit to the Yarrabah area.

In December 2023 Cairns had record flooding caused by Cyclone Jasper. The Barron River exceeded the March 1977 record of 3.8 metres (12 ft), making it the worst flooding event in Cairns since records began in 1915.

== See also ==
- History of Queensland
- 2023 Cairns floods
