= Henrietta Marrie =

Australian professor

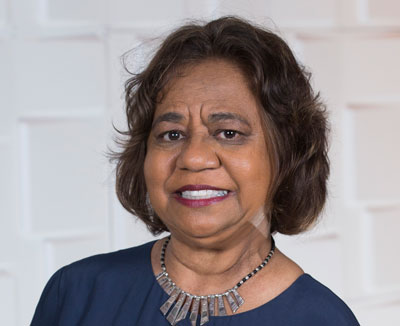
- Born: Henrietta Fourmile; Yarrabah, Queensland
- Other name: Bukal
- Education: South Australian College of Advanced Education (Teaching diploma, 1987), (University of South Australia, Graduate Diploma of Arts, 1990), Macquarie University, Masters in Environmental and Local Government Law, 1999)
- Known for: Scholarship and advocacy in relation to cultural heritage policy, biocultural diversity, Indigenous intellectual and cultural property, Indigenous natural heritage rights, protected area management, traditional ecological knowledge.
- Spouse: Adrian Marrie

Henrietta Marrie AM (née Fourmile; born 1954), also known as Bukal, is an Australian scholar, Indigenous rights activist, and Gimuy Walubara Yidinji elder. She has been an Australian Research Council (ARC) Fellow and honorary professor with the University of Queensland. Marrie's scholarship includes biocultural diversity, indigenous intellectual property, and traditional ecological knowledge.

Marrie was the first Aboriginal Australian to be appointed to a full-time professional role with the United Nations, was a senior fellow at the United Nations University, and has held academic positions at a number of universities. She has influenced global legislation in the areas of biodiversity and cultural heritage, and has fought for Aboriginal and Torres Strait Islander peoples' cultural rights, access to and repatriation of ancestral remains, cultural objects and important historical information from national and state museums and archives. She has published over 100 academic papers, reports, and chapters in edited books.

== Early life, Country, and education ==
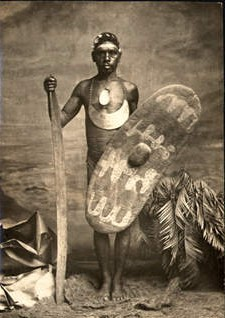
Ye-i-nie, King of Cairns Photo: A Atkinson 1905

Henrietta Marrie was born as Henrietta Fourmile in Yarrabah, Queensland, in 1954, and was raised there. She is a Gimuy Yidinji. Yarrabah is an Aboriginal community approx 10 km (6.2 mi) due east or 52 km (32 mi) south-east by road of Gimuy (Cairns). Yarrabah is the traditional Country of Gunggandji and Yidinji people; however, the community is made up of many other tribal groups due to the forcible relocations as part of government policies since colonisation. The Gimuy Walubara Yidinji people are the original custodians of Gimuy (Cairns) and the surrounding areas. The area of the foreshore of the City of Cairns is traditionally known as Gimuy – after the Slippery Blue Fig Tree. The lands of the Yidinji people extend south of the Barron River to the Russell River in the south, west to Tolga in the ranges, and east to Wambilari (Murray Prior Range). The lands in the Cairns suburb of Woree, close to Admiralty Island and Trinity Inlet, were the principal traditional camping grounds of the Gimuy Walubara Yidinji people.

Henrietta is the eldest daughter of Henry Fourmile (aka Queebalum – cyclone) and the great-granddaughter of Ye-i-nie, a Yidinji leader whose leadership was recognised by the Queensland Government in 1905 through the award of a king plate bearing the title "Ye-i-nie, King of Cairns 1905. Her Yidinji language name is "Bukal", which is the black lawyer vine, a prickly climbing plant.

She attended primary school in Yarrabah, and later studied teaching at the South Australian College of Advanced Education, where she obtained a Diploma in Teaching in 1987. Later, after the college had been transformed into the University of South Australia, she obtained a Graduate Diploma of Arts (Indigenous Studies) in 1990.

After spending some time working in Cairns, Marrie later undertook a Masters in Environmental and Local Government Law through Macquarie University, graduating in 1999. Her thesis was entitled "The Convention on Biological Diversity, Intellectual Property Rights, and the Protection of Traditional Ecological Knowledge" (20 July 1998).

== Career ==
It was during her time in South Australia that she came across white anthropologist Norman Tindale's photographs, and later met him at the South Australian Museum in 1985. It was this meeting that led to the museum's release of the Tindale genealogies, which enabled many families to reconnect to each other and their country through native title processes. The collection South Australian Museum Tindale collection (Series AA338/01) includes a letter from Tindale to Henrietta Fourmile granting permission to use the Yarrabah genealogies, dated 16 March 1986. Her work and activism for the return of Indigenous cultural property continues, alongside others such as Kamilaroi elder Bob Weatherall.

She has held academic posts at a number of Australian universities, including the Centre for Indigenous History and the Arts at the University of Western Australia. After undertaking academic roles in Brisbane, in 1991 she returned to Gimuy (Cairns), where she co-ordinated the Cairns College of Technical and Further Education's Aboriginal ranger training program. In 1994 she became the coordinator of a new Aboriginal and Torres Strait Islander Participation, Research and Development Centre in James Cook University. From Cairns, Marrie undertook a Masters in Environmental and Local Government Law through Macquarie University in Sydney. Her interests and concerns developed further around biocultural diversity, indigenous intellectual property, and traditional ecological knowledge,

In 1997 Marrie was appointed to a position in the United Nations Environment Programme in Montreal at the Secretariat of the Convention on Biological Diversity. Until 2003, she was responsible for Article 8(j) of the Convention, which related to signatories respecting, maintaining and preserving traditional knowledge of indigenous peoples and local communities relating to biodiversity. She was the first Aboriginal Australian to be appointed to a full-time professional role at the UN, and went on to become the North Australian Program Manager, overseeing nearly $30 million in grants to promote and encourage Indigenous biological and cultural diversity across northern Australia.

In 2003, Marrie began working at the Christensen Fund, a private philanthropic organisation, to distribute grants and funds to help promote, sustain, and encourage Indigenous biocultural diversity across Australia's north (including the Cairns region).

She has influenced global legislation in the areas of biodiversity and cultural heritage, and has fought for Aboriginal and Torres Strait Islander peoples' cultural rights, access to and repatriation of ancestral remains, cultural objects and important historical information from national and state museums and archives. Marrie's scholarship includes biocultural diversity, indigenous intellectual property, and traditional ecological knowledge. Through her scholarship and activism she has "fought for the recognition of Aboriginal peoples intellectual property and cultural rights and particularly for access to and repatriation of ancestral remains, cultural objects and important historical information from national and state museums and archives".

In 2012 she began working for the United Nations University's Institute of Advanced Studies Traditional Knowledge Initiative. She was later(?) appointed visiting fellow at the United Nations University Institute for Sustainability and Peace in Tokyo.

In 2013 Marrie was engaged by the CEO of the Cairns and Hinterland Hospital and Health Service to investigate discrimination against Aboriginal and Torres Strait Islander employees. Marrie's review identified the role of institutional racism underpinning and reinforcing the interpersonal racism being experienced by Aboriginal and Torres Strait Islander employees. Together with her husband Adrian Marrie, they developed a tool to support the identification, measurement, and monitoring of institutional racism in the hospital and health service. They applied this tool in June 2014 to the Cairns and Hinterland Hospital and Health Service, sharing the findings with the Cairns and Hinterland Hospital and Health Service, the Anti-Discrimination Commissioner for Queensland and the Australian Human Rights Commission. This work led to substantive changes in the Cairns and Hinterland Hospital and Health Service and was extended by Adrian Marrie to assess all Hospital and Health Services in Queensland and drove legislative change. The tool was named the Bukal Institutional Racism Matrix by Adrian Marrie, who said that his wife's "insights, strength and feistiness have forever been my inspiration". The "Marrie Matrix" continues to be used as an auditing tool, leading to significant changes in the state's public health system, including amendments to the Hospital and Health Boards Act 2011 (Qld). It was used in a 2017 report by Anti-Discrimination Queensland, as well as an audit by Health Performance Council of South Australia in 2020.

The importance of the work done by Henrietta and Adrian Marrie to address racial discrimination in health care was acknowledged in a dedication at the front of the "Cairns and Hinterland Hospital and Health Service First Peoples Health Equity Strategy 2022–2025".

In 2021 she joined the ARC Uniquely Australian Foods (UAF) Training Centre, at the University of Queensland (UQ) to advise on best practice protocols to protect the rights and interests of Indigenous participants in the project.

While an honorary professor with UAF based at The University of Queensland, in 2023 she was a recipient of a fellowship of an Australian Research Centre (ARC) Discovery Australian Aboriginal and Torres Strait Awards (DAATSIA), tasked "to build community-based databases to protect, preserve and facilitate community-controlled use of ethnobotanical knowledge – the study of indigenous or traditional knowledge of plants".

As of October 2026, she no longer appears to be at UQ.

== Other activities ==
Marrie has co-chaired the Indigenous Affinity Group of Philanthropy Australia and has served on the boards of UMI Arts and the Australian Environmental Grantmakers Network. She has served on several government committees and inquiries, and acted as a consultant to government agencies such Environment Australia, the Wet Tropics Management Agency, and the Great Barrier Reef Marine Park Authority. She was chief investigator for the Great Barrier Reef Indigenous Tourism Project, and was co-author of its report "Great Barrier Reef Indigenous Tourism: Translating Policy into Practice" (published March 2020).

In 2023, Marrie was the patron of the Cairns Indigenous Art Fair, and was on the council for the Australian Institute of Aboriginal and Torres Strait Islander Studies, and a member of the Queensland Human Rights Commission's Aboriginal and Torres Strait Islander Advisory Group.

As of October 2026, Marrie is chair of the Advisory Group of the Indigenous Knowledge Institute at the University of Melbourne.

== Recognition ==
Marrie is internationally recognised as an Indigenous rights activist. Cultural leader and theatre director Rhoda Roberts noted that she had summed her up, in her notes about Marrie, as "The Unexpected Quiet Revolutionary".

Marrie was responsible for the name of the Queensland Human Rights Commission's First Nations Unit, Yirmba (Ye-rim-BA), in consultation with Gimuy Walubara Yidinji members. The name means a four-pronged spear, representing justice, survival, leadership, and strength.

=== In the arts ===
In 2018 Marrie was selected as the subject for a Sea Wall Mural on the side of the Cairns Corporate Tower in Lake Street. The mural by artist Claire Foxton is called "If we lose our reef, we lose ourselves", and honours Marrie's contribution to the preservation and promotion of cultural heritage.

Also in 2018, a stage dramatisation of her life and work, titled Bukal, premiered on July 10 during NAIDOC week. The theme for NAIDOC week that year was "because of her we can". Thee play was produced by the Jute Theatre Company, written and directed by Andrea James, with important cultural guidance and input from Marrie's eldest son Carl Fourmile. Throughout the development and production, Jute aimed to engage First Nations people in as many creative, performance and production roles as possible, had First Nations' led decision making, and designed the set to maximise the potential for touring the play to smaller communities. The approach was praised by Marrie and creative director, Bundjalung woman Rhoda Roberts on the opening night, who stated: "The greatest commitment is allowing and enabling Aboriginal people to have their own voice and thank you for that because you had the trust and the faith in the story and you allowed this new voice of young Aboriginal people to tell this story of one of our 'because of her we can', Aunty Henrietta". Three actresses (Taeg Twist, Maurial Spearim, and Alexis West) portrayed Bukal, each representing different aspects of her character. The play ran during the Cairns Indigenous Art Fair, receiving outstanding community and critical reviews. It provided a residency program for First Nations youth, and, after touring in North Queensland schools, played at the Woodford Folk Festival.

A documentary film about Marrie, titled Bukal Bukal, was co-directed by Rhoda Roberts and Pauline Clague, tells of Marrie's attempts to reclaim her family's stolen artefacts from the British Museum, and her efforts to seek justice for Indigenous cultural heritage. The film, which is produced by Julie Nihill, Mitchell Stanley, and Rhea Stephenson, has its world premiere at a free, all-ages event on 24 October 2026 at Yitpi Yartapuultiku in Port Adelaide, South Australia, as part of the Adelaide Film Festival.

=== Awards and honours ===
- 2014: Recipient of a 100 Women of Influence Award in public policy for her work at the United Nations University
- 2018: Member of the Order of Australia (General Division), Australia Day, 26 January 2018, for her "significant service to the community as an advocate for indigenous cultural heritage and intellectual property rights, and to education", with the Queensland Governor Paul de Jersey officially presenting the honor to her at a ceremony held on 30 April 2018
- 2018: Named as one of the Queensland Greats by Queensland Premier Annastacia Palaszczuk in a ceremony at the Queensland Art Gallery on 8 June 2018.
- 2023: Recognised for her leadership and contributions to society with a University of South Australia Alumni Award

== Publications ==
Marrie has published over 100 academic papers, reports, and chapters in edited books. Her publications address cultural heritage policy, Indigenous cultural property, the role of native title in the protection of Indigenous heritage and the protection of biodiversity related knowledges, the benefit of Traditional Owners in protected area management, institutional racism and Indigenous Tourism.

- Fourmile, Henrietta (1987). Racism in legislation : the bill for the South Australian Aboriginal Heritage Act 1987.
- Fourmile, Henrietta (1987), "Aborigines and Museums: A Case Study in Scientific Colonialism", Praxis (17): 7–11
- Fourmile, Henrietta (1989), "Aboriginal Heritage legislation and Self-Determination", Australian-Canadian Studies, 7 (1–2)
- Fourmile, Henrietta (1989), "Who Owns the Past?: Aborigines as Captives of the Archives", Aboriginal History, 13: 1–8
- Fourmile, Henrietta (1989), "Aboriginal arts in relation to multiculturalism", in Cramer, Sue (ed.), Postmodernism : a consideration of the appropriation of Aboriginal imagery : forum papers, Brisbane: Institute of Modern Art
- Fourmile, Henrietta (1990), "Possession is nine-tenths of the law: And don't Aboriginal people know it", Bulletin of the Conference of Museum Anthropologists
- Fourmile, Henrietta (1990), "The Case for Independent but Complementary Aboriginal Cultural Institutions", Extending Parameters: Galleries and Communities
- Hall, Doug; Fourmile, Henrietta, eds. (1990), Trevor Nickolls : gondola dreaming and other dreams, Queensland College of Art Gallery
- Fourmile, Henrietta, The Need for an Independent National Inquiry into State Collections of Aboriginal and Torres Strait Islander Cultural Heritage (1992) 1(56) Aboriginal Law Bulletin 3.
- Fourmile, Henrietta (1993), "Cultural management & tourism", in Testa, Joe (ed.), [Video Recording], Lismore, NSW: Gungil Jindibah Centre, Southern Cross University
- Fourmile, Henrietta (1993). "Cultural Survival vs Cultural Prostitution". Cultural Tourism Awareness Workshop on Indigenous Cultural Tourism in Far North Queensland.
- Fourmile, Henrietta (1993). "Representing Kunggandji/Yidinji". Julayinbul Conference on Intellectual and Cultural Property.
- Henrietta, Fourmile, Submission : inquiry into Aboriginal and Torres Strait Islander Culture and Heritage, House of Representatives Standing Committee on Aboriginal and Torres Strait Islander Affairs.
- Moscardo, G.; Pearce, P.L.; Birtles, A.; Valentine, P.; Fourmile, H.; Burns, D.; Young, M.; Haxton, P. (1994), "Rainforest tourism: Research for Quality Tourism Management", Annual Meeting of the CRC-TREM
- Fourmile, Henrietta (1996) "Making Things Work: Aboriginal and Torres Strait Islander Involvement in BioRegional Planning". Biodiversity Series Paper No. 10. Department of Environment, Sport & Territories
- H L Fourmile, ‘The Queensland Heritage Act 1992 and the Cultural Record (Landscapes Queensland and Queensland Estate) Act 1987: Legislative Discrimination in the Protection of Indigenous Cultural Heritage’ (1996) 1(4) Australian Indigenous Law Reporter 507 – 529. Page 3 - 6
- H L Fourmile, ‘Using Prior Informed Consent Procedures under the Convention on Biological Diversity to Protect Indigenous Traditional Ecological Knowledge and Natural Resource Rights’ (1998) 4(16) Indigenous Law Bulletin 14–17.
- H L Fourmile-Marrie, ‘Bushtucker – Some Food For Thought’ (1999) 19(4) Artlink 34–37.
- H L Marrie, ‘National Research Institutions and their Obligations to Indigenous and Local Communities under Article 8(j) of the Convention on Biological Diversity’ (2000) 1 Humanities Research 41–53.
- H L Fourmile, ‘Indigenous interests in biological resources in Commonwealth Areas – synthesis of submissions and related information’ in J Voumard (chair), Access to Biological Resources in Commonwealth Areas: Commonwealth Public Inquiry (AGPS, Canberra 2000), 199–278
- H L Fourmile-Marrie, ‘Developing a Regime to Protect Indigenous Traditional Biodiversity-Related Knowledge (TBRK)’ (2000) 1(1) Balayi: Culture, Law and Colonialism 163–182
- H L Marrie, ‘The UNESCO Convention for the Safeguarding of the Intangible Cultural Heritage and the Protection and Maintenance of the Intangible Cultural Heritage of Indigenous Peoples’ in L. Smith and N Akagawa (eds), Intangible Heritage: Key Issues in Cultural Heritage (Routledge, UK 2008), 169–192.
- H L Marrie. Emerging trends in the generation, transmission and protection of Traditional Knowledge. Presentation to the 18th Session of the UN Permanent Forum on Indigenous Issues, New York (2019). Available at: https://www.un.org/development/desa/indigenouspeoples/wp-content/uploads/sites/19/2019/04/TK-Emerging-trends-in-the-generation-transmission-and-protection-of-TK-final-paper.pdf
- K. Galloway McLean, A. Marrie and H L Marrie. Great Barrier Reef Indigenous Tourism: Translating Policy into Practice. Report to the National Environmental Science Program (2020). Reef and Rainforest Research Centre Ltd, Cairns, Queensland.
