= Always Will Be =

Always Will Be may refer to:

== Music ==
- Always Will Be (EP), a 2003 EP by J-Live
- "Always Will Be" (HammerFall song), 2000

== Other uses ==
- "Always Was, Always Will Be [Aboriginal Land]", often abbreviated to "Always Will be", a rallying cry for protest in the Australian Aboriginal rights movement
- Always Will Be (exhibition), a 2017 exhibition of photographs by Aboriginal Australian photojournalist Barbara McGrady

== See also ==
- Always Was, Is and Always Shall Be, 1980 album by GG Allin
- It Always Will Be, 2004 album by Willie Nelson
