= Azure Hermes =

Australian Indigenous genomicist

Azure Hermes is a Gimuy Walubara Yidinji woman who works at the intersection of genomics and indigenous community engagement, and the deputy director of the National Centre for Indigenous Genomics (NCIG) at Australian National University.

== Career ==
Hermes has worked with Australian First Nations communities for at least 10 years.

She previously held the post of Indigenous community engagement coordinator at the NCIG, and was responsible for informing communities about the existence of blood samples that had been held without consent at Australian National University. She retroactively sought consent from the communities from which samples were taken.

At the NCIG, she oversaw the return of blood samples taken in 1968 and 1969 after an outbreak of typhoid fever to the Galiwin'ku community on Elcho Island in 2019. Subsequently, she commissioned burial poles from the island to represent those who have passed away, and installed the burial poles at ANU in 2021, for National Reconciliation Week. The Galiwin'ku community gave permission for hundreds of blood samples from those who are still alive to have their genomes sequenced. Hermes was interviewed on Collaboratory Podcast to discuss her work on the sample return project.
