= Djabugay language =

Endangered Australian Aboriginal language

Djabugay
- Region: Queensland, Australia
- Ethnicity: Djabugay, Buluwai, Yirrganydji (Irukandji)
- Native speakers: 81 (2021 census)
- Language family: Pama–Nyungan: Paman; Djabugay
- Dialects: Djabugay; Yirrgay (Irrukandji); Bulway; Guluy; Njagali (Nyagali)

Language codes
- ISO 639-3: dyy
- Glottolog: dyaa1242
- AIATSIS: Y106
- ELP: Djabugay
- Djabugay is classified as Severely Endangered by the UNESCO Atlas of the World's Languages in Danger.

Djabugay (or Djabuganjdji; see below for other names) is an endangered Australian Aboriginal language spoken by the Djabugay people with 81 native speakers at the 2021 census. The Djabugay language region includes Far North Queensland, particularly around the Kuranda Range and Barron River catchment, and the landscape within the local government boundaries of the Cairns Regional Council.

== Classification ==
Though sometimes placed in a separate Yidinyic branch of Pama–Nyungan, Bowern (2011) retains Djabugay in its traditional place within the Paman languages.

== Dialects ==
The following languages are confirmed dialects of Djabugay by the AUSTLANG database maintained by Australian Institute of Aboriginal and Torres Strait Islander Studies. Djabugay is used both as a language name and a dialect name. Additional names for these languages and/or dialects have been listed after their names but terms do overlap and the lists are not exhaustive.

- Y106: Djabugay / Tjapukai – Barron River dialect, Binggu, Bulum-Bulum, Buluwai, Check-Cull, Chewlie, Dja:bugay, Djabugai, Djabuganjdji, Djabungandji, Dyaabugay, Dyabugandyi, Dyabugay, Hileman, Irukandjai, Kikonjunkulu, Kodgotto, Koko-Tjumbundji, Koko njunkulu, Koko nyungalo, Koko Tjumbundji, Kokonjunkulu, Kokonyungalo, Ngarlkadjie, Njakali, Nyakali, Orlow, Tapelcay, Tcabogai tjanji, Tja:pukanja, Tjabakai-Thandji, Tjabogai tjandji, Tjabogai tjanji, Tjabogaijanji, Tjabogaitjandji, Tjankir, Tjankun, Tjapukandji, Tjapukanja, Tjapunkandji, Tjunbundji, Toabogai tjani, Tuffelcey
- Y110: Bulway – Buluwan dyi, Buluwandji, Buluwandyi, Bulwandji, Bulwandyi
- Y111: Yirrgay – Chumchum, Dingal, Djabungandji, Dungara, Dungarah, Illagona, Irakanji, Irukandji, Tingaree, Tingeree, Umbay, Walpoll, Wongulli, Yerkanji, Yettkie, Yirgandji, Yirgay, Yirkandji, Yirkanji
- Y160: Guluy – Dyaabugay
- Y162: Nyagali – Njagali

== Phonology ==
Consonants
	Labial	Apico- alveolar	Retroflex	Lamino- palatal	Dorso- velar
Plosive	b	d		ɟ	g
Nasal	m	n		ɲ	ŋ
Lateral		l			
Rhotic		r	ɻ		
Semivowel	w			j	

Vowels
	Front	Back
High	i iː	u uː
Low	a aː	

== Vocabulary ==
Some words from the Djabugay language, as spelt and written by Djabugay authors include:

- Bulurru: elsewhere known as Dreaming, the source of life.
- Gurrabana: where people and everything in Djabugay society and life is divided between wet and dry, this is the wet season side.
- Gurraminya: where people and everything in Djabugay society and life is divided between wet and dry, this is the dry season side.
- Djirri-nyurra: hello
- Guyu: fish
- Gan gula: kangaroo
- Bulmba: home
- Bana: rain
- Wuru: river
- Bungan: sun

== See also ==
- Yidiny language
