= Desperate Measures (TV series) =

2013 Australian TV documentary series

Desperate Measures is an Australian television documentary series of historical and political matters relating to Indigenous Australians, with three series that aired on National Indigenous Television (NITV) between 2013 and 2018.

== Overview ==
Desperate measures tells the stories of Aboriginal and Torres Strait Islander people who have been part of political movements and/or who have made an impact on Australian Government policies.

Three series went to air on NITV: Series 1 in 2013; Series 2 in 2014; and Series 3 in 2017–18.

The series is used as a reference in academic papers and on websites, such as Redfern Oral History, as well as being kept as video resources in academic libraries.

== Episodes ==
=== Series 1 ===
Series 1 consisted of the following episodes:

- "Coming of the Light", about the Torres Strait Islander people's celebration of the coming of Christianity to their islands
- "Through the Eyes of Lens with Merv Bishop" (photographer)
- "NAISDA with Monica Stevens"
- "Gadigal" (interview with Lily Shearer about the Gadigal Information Service, owner of Koori Radio in Sydney)
- "1988 March for Justice, Freedom and Hope" (about the protest march against the Australian Bicentenary, organised by Linda Burney and others)
- "Redfern All Blacks", about the Indigenous Australian semi-professional rugby league club based in Redfern, Sydney
- "Glanville Station with Glen Ellis"
- "Kevin Gilbert"
- "Black Tuesday with Janet Cox"
- "Through the Lens with Barbara McGrady" (photographer)
- "Payne St Life on the Fringe"
- "Living with Two Laws"
- "Opal Days"
- "Faith, the Len Colbung Story"
- "Black Panthers"
- "Kaurareg with Milton Savage"
- "Donald Thomson with Agnes Waramba"
- "A Rare Gem: Coloured Stone" (about the band Coloured Stone)
- "Malaytown" (about Malay Town, a shanty town on the outskirts of Cairns in the 1930s and 1940s)
- "Jambi with Elaine Terrick"
