= Yirrganydji =

Indigenous Australian people

Yirrganydji people
- Aka: Irukandji
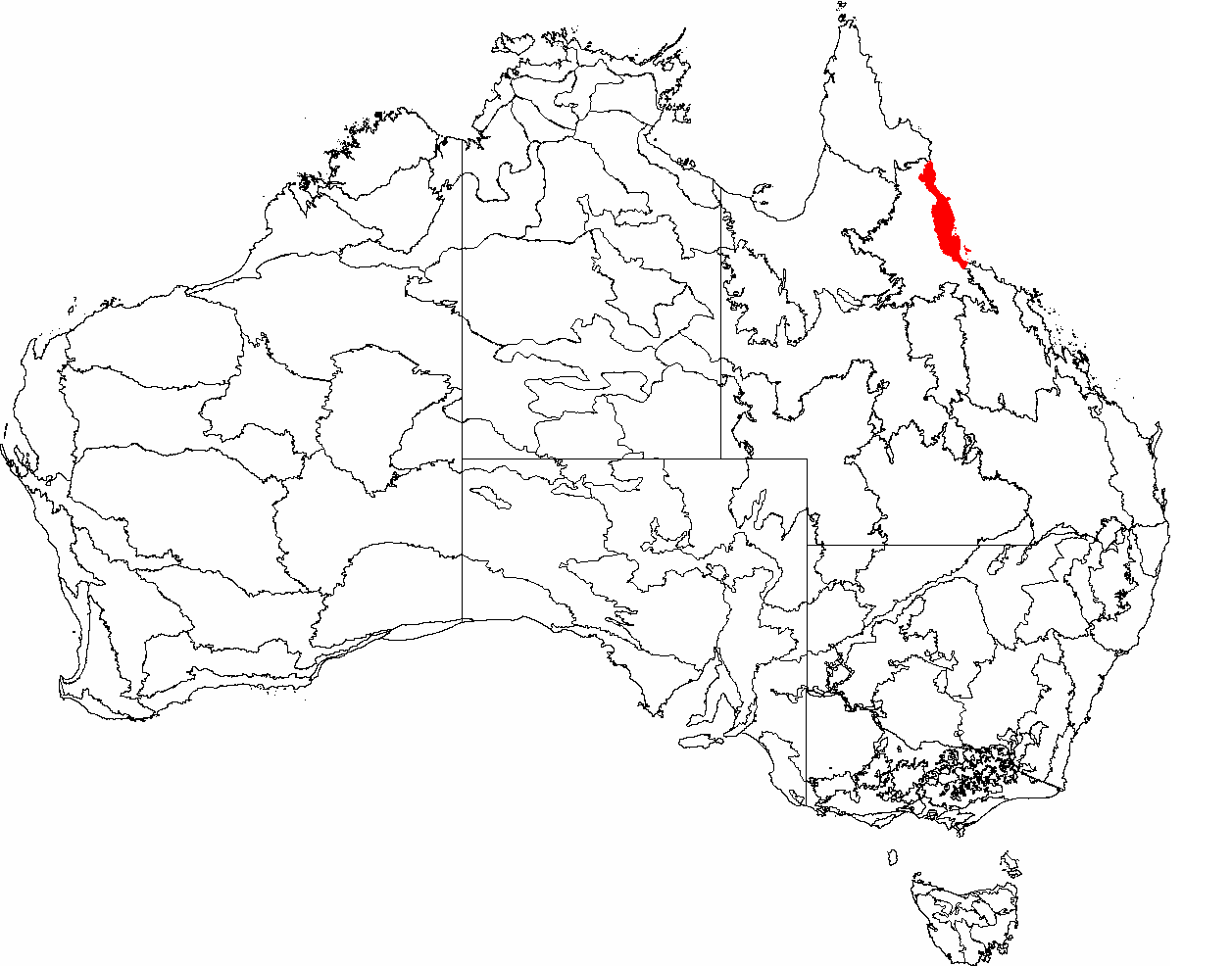
- Wet Tropics bioregion

Language
- Language Family: Pama–Nyungan
- Language Branch: Yidinic
- Language Group: Djabugay
- Group Dialect: Yirrgay

Area (approx. 500 km²)
- BioRegion: Wet Tropics
- Location: Far North Queensland
- Coordinates: 16°45′S 145°40′E
- Rivers: Barron River; Mowbray River
- Other Geological: Double Island (a.k.a. Wangal Djunggay); Admiralty Island
- Urban Areas: Port Douglas; Cairns (a.k.a. Ki: muy); Woree (a.k.a. Warri / Pukul); Palm Cove

The Yirrganydji (Irrukandji) people are an Indigenous Australian people of Queensland who trace their descent from the Irukandji and, as such, are the original custodians of a narrow coastal strip within Djabugay country that runs northwards from Cairns, Queensland to Port Douglas. Their traditional lifestyle was that of fishers along this coastal strip and around the river mouths, islands and seas between the Barron River and Port Douglas.

== Language ==
The Irukandji spoke Yirrgay, one of the five dialects of the language group generally known as Djabugay. (Note: The other three were Bulway, Guluy, and Njagali.) These dialects indicate that Djabugay was genetically related to Yidiny, with a lexical overlap of 53%.

== Country ==
Irukandji country, according to Norman Tindale, extended over some 200 square miles (520 km^{2}), running along the narrow coastal strip from Cairns to the Mowbray River at Port Douglas. Their inland extension went some 7 miles northwest of Cairns, around the tidal waters of the Barron River around Redlynch. Dialects defined tribal distinctions, and the Irukandji dialect Yirrgay, was the southernmost of the group, with the Yidinji people to their immediate south, while, northwards, one encountered, in geographic order, Guluy, Ngakali and finally Djabugay. The Bulway-speakers lay to their west, from Woree to Mareeba. (Note: Writing in 1939 Ursula McConnel, stated the order:'South of Port Douglas is another group – the indyi or andyi tribes of Mowbray, Barron and Mulgrave Rivers, surveyed originally by Roth and later by me in 1931. On the Mowbray River are the Tyabogai-tyanyi, a branch of whom on the Barron River are known as the Nyakali. On the south side of the Barron River are the Bulwandyi; low down on the Barron River are the Yirkandyi.')

== History ==
The Irukandji as a distinct tribal identity were close to extinction by the end of the 19th century. William Parry-Okeden, in a short report on Queensland Aboriginal people written in his capacity as Police Commissioner, wrote in 1897 that he counted 6 Yettkie, a name now thought to refer to a remnant of the Irukandji. The following year Billy Jagar, leader of the Irukandji, received a King plate, designating him as 'King of Barron', a gesture repeated in 1906 with a second plate bearing the same inscription. Jagar died at the age of 60 in 1930 in his traditional payu hut at the northern end of the Cairns Esplanade. Writing in 1974 Tindale stated:

'The term Irukandji for the people on the coast near Redlynch in the area around Cairns has been in dispute because of their early demise as a tribe. By 1952 remembrance of their existence had almost died out and a mixed Tjapukai and Mamu group, from higher up the Barron River, and from the south had usurped their territory. They call themselves the Djumbandji. The coastal Irukandji were said to have been a taller people than the rain forest dwellers. In 1964 Jack Doolan questioned several informants, none from the Cairns area, who believed the Irukandji did not exist. They based their ideas on information that irukandji meant “from the north.” They suggested that if a Keramai (Giramai) or a Mamu was questioned about the country from which a northern stranger might have come he would simply refer to him as an Irukandji, that is, a “northerner.” In similar fashion he might refer to a man from the west as gambilbara, a rain forest man, or from the east as a djindigal (Jindigal).'

== Modern times ==
In recent times there have been clashes in claims advanced respectively by the Yirrganydji Aboriginal Tribal Corporation (Dawul Wuru Aboriginal Corporation) and the Djabugay Aboriginal Tribal Corporation, the former insisting that any development projects by the Djabugay in the historic territories of their Irukandji forebears, require their consent and participation.

The Irukandji jellyfish are named after Irrukandji country.

== Alternative names ==
- Irakanji, Yirkandji, Yirkanji
- Yirgay
- Yettkie (Parry-Okeden 1897, misreading of Yerrkie)
- Illagona
- Wongulli (camp toponym, at Cairns' southern city limit, 1974)
- Dungara (horde on Lower Barron River)
- Tingaree
- Dungarah
- Dingal

== Sources ==
- Bottoms, Timothy (1999). Djabudai Country: An Aboriginal History of Tropical North Queensland. Allen & Unwin. ISBN 978-1-865-08031-4.
- Dixon, R. M. W. (1977). A Grammar of Yidin. Cambridge University Press. ISBN 978-0-521-21462-9.
- Dixon, Robert M. W. (2002). Australian Languages: Their Nature and Development. Vol. 1. Cambridge University Press. ISBN 978-0-521-47378-1.
- Henry, Rosita (2012). Performing Place, Practising Memories: Aboriginal Australians, Hippies and the State. Berghahn Books. ISBN 978-0-857-45508-6.
- "King "Billy Jager" dead". The Cairns Post. 11 March 1930. p. 4 – via Trove.
- McConnel, Ursula H. (September 1939). "Social Organization of the Tribes of Cape York Peninsula, North Queensland". Oceania. 10 (1): 54–72. doi:10.1002/j.1834-4461.1939.tb00256.x. JSTOR 40327744.
- Parry-Okeden, William E. (1897). Report on the North Queensland aborigines and the native police (and map). Brisbane: Parliament of Queensland.
- Richards, Francis (1926). Customs and language of the Western Hodgkinson aboriginals. Vol. 8. Memoirs of the Queensland Museum. pp. 249–265.
- Tindale, Norman Barnett (1974). Aboriginal Tribes of Australia: Their Terrain, Environmental Controls, Distribution, Limits, and Proper Names. Australian National University Press. ISBN 978-0-708-10741-6.
