= Bulway =

Aboriginal Australian people

The Buluwai are an indigenous Australian people of the state of Queensland.

== Country ==
The Buluwai are a rainforest people of the Atherton Tableland, occupying, according to Norman Tindale, some 200 square miles (520 km^{2}) in the area east of Tolga, and extending on north to Kuranda, and in a south-westerly direction to Tinaroo. The Barron River formed their coastal limit.

== Language ==
The Buluwai language was recorded by Norman Tindale in 1938 during the Harvard and Adelaide Universities Anthropological Expedition, Australia, 1938–1939.

== Oxycanus buluwandji ==
Oxycanus buluwandji is a moth of the family Hepialidae, often referred to as swift moths or ghost moths. The family is considered primitive with at least 587 moths identified worldwide, including southern Gondwana distribution. Adult moths have greyish brown forewings each with a faint pale pattern. The hindwings are red shading to grey along the margins. The head and thorax have fawn patterns, and the abdomen is red. The wingspan is about 12 cms.

Norman Tindale first described the Buluwandji ghost moth in 1964 and named it after the Buluwai people where the moth was found.

== History ==
The Seventh-day Adventists established a mission on Buluwai lands in 1930 calling it Mona Mona Aboriginal Mission. According to contemporary Buluwai elder Willie Brim, the missionaries imposed a highly regimented 'Christian' way of life. The Mission was closed down in 1962.

Today most descendants identify themselves with the Djabugay people, though some Buluwai maintain a separate identity as a Bama group.

== Alternative names ==
- Buluwandji
- Bulwandji, Buluwandyi, Bulwandyi
- Bulwanydji
- Bulway
