= Yidiny people =

Aboriginal Australian people of Far North Queensland

The Yidiny (also spelt Yidindj, Yidinji or Yidiñ), (Note: Though Yidin is often given, the language has a final palatal nasal, not dissimilar to the Spanish ñ (Dixon 2011, p. 211).) are an Aboriginal Australian people in Far North Queensland. Their language is the Yidiny language.

== Language ==
The last fluent speakers of Yidiny were Tilly Fuller (d. October 1974), George Davis (b.1919), Dick Moses (b.1898) and his sister Ida Burnett of White Rock. A substantial part of the language has been analysed and recorded by Robert M. W. Dixon.

== Country ==
The Yidiny lands were in lowland rainforest areas, stretching from Barron River near Cairns down to the south, where their borders met those of the Ngajanji and the Mamu. To their north were the coastal Djabugay people. In Norman Tindale's calculation, the Yidiny tribal lands were estimated to cover some 400 square miles (1,000 km^{2}). These included the areas of Deeral north to Barron River north of Cairns. Their inland extension ran as far as Mount Hypipamee. Their eastern boundary was on the crest of the Prior Range.

Today, there are four traditional owner groups representing the peoples of the Cairns region. One of these groups represents the Yidinji clans, and comprises Gimuy Walubara Yidinji, Dulabed Malanbarra and Yidinji, Mandingalbay Yidinji and Wadjanbarra Tableland Yidinji.

== History of contact ==
=== Colonisation ===
The Yidiny, along with most other tribal peoples in the tropical rainforest regions (from Cairns to Ingham) and the Atherton Tableland, were killed or otherwise forced off their homelands to further the establishment of white settlements, cattle stations and sugarcane plantations. In 1938, a Mr. Jack Kane recalled his own participation in one of these massacres, describing a week-long campaign in 1884 during which Queensland police and native troopers encircled a Yidiny camp—at what became known as Skull Pocket—several miles north of Yungaburra; at dawn, a shot was fired from across the camp to force the inhabitants to flee, and, as they scattered into the surrounding terrain, they were ambushed and shot down. The native police reportedly stabbed or smashed the heads of the children. One group of the Yidiny broke off from the rest of the tribe in the early period of settlement, and, after shifting to the area of the present-day Redlynch, asserted a distinctive identity by calling themselves the Djumbandji. This group took over a part of Buluwai territory.

Starting around 1910, those who remained—even within the areas of white settlements—were the focus of a Queensland Government campaign of assimilation by the Anglican mission at Yarrabah (on the Cape Grafton peninsula). By the 1920s, as each tribe was weakened by dispersal and fragmentation, the different elders formed a plan to organise themselves into a more viable political unit, in the form of a macro-tribe; the merger failed to take hold, due to the distinct linguistic differences between groups.

=== Sovereignty ===
In 2014, 40 members of the Yidiny people, led by Murrumu Walubara Yidindji (formerly Jeremy Geia) renounced legal ties with Australia to form the Sovereign Yidindji Government, claiming sovereignty over the lands from south of Port Douglas to Cairns and the Atherton Tablelands.

== Social organisation ==
The Yidiny were composed of several Clans, with Norman Tindale (1974) reporting five:

- Gimuy
- Walubara
- Maiara
- Maimbi
- Djumbandji

Newer sources list eight:

- Gimuy-walubarra Yidi (the traditional custodians of the area around and including the city of Cairns; Gimuy is the traditional name of the area)
- Wadjanbarra Yidi
- Bundabarra Yidi
- Gulgibarra Yidi
- Wujnur/Bindabarra Yidi
- Mandigalpi Yidi
- Badjabarra Yidi
- Mallanbarra Yidi
- Walubarra Yidi

== Alternative names ==
- Bolambi (from the personal name of one of the tribe's former leaders)
- Charroogin
- Djumbandji
- Idi (abbreviated autonym)
- Idin
- Idinji
- Itti
- Jumbandjie
- Maiara
- Maimbi
- Mulgrave River dialect (Archibald Meston)
- Myarah
- Yellingie
- Yettingie
- Yidin
- Yidindji, Yidindyi

== Sources ==
- Bottoms, Timothy (2013). Conspiracy of Silence (PDF). Allen & Unwin. ISBN 978-1-743-31382-4.
- Dixon, R. M. W. (1977). A Grammar of Yidin. Cambridge University Press. ISBN 978-0-521-21462-9.
- Dixon, R. M. W. (1991). Words of Our Country: Stories, Place Names and Vocabulary in Yidiny, the Aboriginal language of the Cairns-Yarrabah region (PDF). University of Queensland Press. ISBN 0-7022-2360-3.
- Dixon, R. M. W. (2011). Searching for Aboriginal Languages: Memoirs of a Field Worker. Cambridge University Press. ISBN 978-1-108-02504-1.
- Dixon, R. M. W. (2015). Edible Gender, Mother-in-Law Style, and Other Grammatical Wonders: Studies in Dyirbal, Yidiñ, and Warrgamay. Oxford University Press. ISBN 978-0-191-00742-2.
- "First People's history & languages". Cairns Regional Council. 5 October 2021.
- Gribble, E. R. B. (31 March 1897). "Class systems. Class systems of the Goonganji, Myarah and Dungarah tribes, being tribes on Cape Grafton, Mulgrave River and lower Barron River". Australasian Anthropological Journal. 1 (4). Sydney: 84 – via Trove.
- Howden, Saffron (2 November 2015). "Murrumu Walubara Yidindji renounces citizenship to reclaim Australia". The Age.
- Howden, Saffron (5 July 2021). "Murrumu Walubara Yidindji renounces citizenship to reclaim Australia". The Age.
- "Local Traditional Owners From The Cairns Region, Far North Queensland". Wet Tropics Plan. 10 November 2018.
- Meston, Archibald (1889). Report of the government scientific expedition to Bellenden-ker Range. Brisbane: James Beal, Government Printer – via BHL.
- Tindale, Norman Barnett (1974). "Idindji (QLD)". Aboriginal Tribes of Australia: Their Terrain, Environmental Controls, Distribution, Limits, and Proper Names. Australian National University Press. Archived from the original on 8 February 2018.
