= Malay Town =

Malay Town was the unofficial name for a shanty town area of Cairns in Australia during the first half of the 20th century.

== History ==
Malay Town was built around Alligator Creek by Malay workers in the early 1900s, but by the 1920s was mainly populated by Torres Strait Islanders, with many immigrant communities also represented. Malay Town remained its unofficial name for some time.

The town itself was surrounded by swamp and mangroves and bordered the city dump. It was described in the following terms:

...there was a place called "Malay Town" set up in Cairns where a whole range of people lived — Aborigines, Torres Strait Islanders, Malays, Chinese, Indians; in fact, everybody except Europeans — and there were probably one or two of them that no-one else wanted.

There were, however, also some post-World War I German migrants, and many living in the town learned multiple languages from their neighbours.

Many of the town's Torres Strait Islander inhabitants were members of three large families who had moved to mainland Australia without permission (their movement restricted by the government until 1947). The Pitt, Sailor and Walters families were among the largest single group of Malay Town inhabitants.

== In media ==
"Malaytown", an episode in the 2013 television series Desperate Measures, featured interviews with the last surviving inhabitants of Malay Town.

== See also ==
- History of Cairns
- Malay Quarter, former name of Bo-Kaap, an area in Cape Town, South Africa
