= Walubarra =

Aboriginal Australian group

- Aka:walubara, walpoll, wolluparra
- Gimuy Walubara Yidinji Elders Aboriginal Corporation Logo

Hierarchy
- Language Family: Pama–Nyungan
- Language Branch: Yidinyic
- Language Group: Yidiɲ
- Group Dialect: coastal Yidiɲ
- BioRegion: Wet Tropics of Queensland
- Location: Far North Queensland
- Coordinates: 16°57′46″S 145°44′35″E
- Mountains: Mount Whitfield
- Other Geological: Trinity Inlet
- Urban Areas: Cairns

Walubarra (aka walubara, walpoll, wolluparra or gimuy walubara yidinji) is the name for the local Aboriginal Australian group (ie the local Yidiny speaking group) whom are particularly associated with, and belong to, the foothills and hillslopes beneath those Wet Tropical mountains that encircle and face, from the west, north west, and north, into the Trinity inlet, being country into which the city of Cairns, (Qld) (Yidiny: Gimuy) has been built

== Local Group ==
A small number of local Yidiɲ language speakers taught the linguist Robert M. W. Dixon that the Cairns and surrounding region's original people (aka bama) can be identified as members of one or other local groups whom have been named after the territory to which they belong, that is local groups whom have been named by attaching the affix bara (trans. 'belonging to') to a noun for that terrain to which they are particularly associated via conception, life history and more.

The Walubarra, for instance, had been named in Yidiɲ by predecessors affixing barra to the noun walu (trans. 'side of hill') to identify them as those persons 'belonging to' the 'foothills', away from the main rivers. Other neighbouring Yidiɲ local groupsinclude:

- the Malanbarra (trans. 'belonging to malan ie large flat rock') for the freshwater upper reaches of the Mulgrave River (and the Little Mulgrave) to the south of the Walubarra, where the river flows across worn, flat rocks
- the Gulgibarra (trans 'belonging to gulgi ie sand) for the lower sandy saltwater reaches of the Mulgrave River, further south of the Walubarra
- the Bundabarra (trans. 'belonging to bunda ie mountain) for the mountains and mountain ranges to the immediate west and behind the Walubarra
- the Wadjanbarra aka Warginbara (trans. 'belonging to wargin ie forest) for the forested areas over the mountains (ie on the Atherton Tableland)

== Sources ==
- Dixon, R. M. W. (1977). A Grammer of Yidiɲ. Cambridge University Press. ISBN 0521214629.
- Dixon, R. M. W. (1991). Words of our country : stories, place names, and vocabulary in Yidiny, the Aboriginal language of the Cairns-Yarrabah region. University of Queensland Press. ISBN 0702223603.
- "First People's history & languages". Cairns Regional Council. 19 November 2022.
- Parry-Okedon, William E (1898). Conditions of the Aborigines. Report of the Commissioner of Police on the Working of "The Aboriginals Protection and Restriction of the Sale of Opium Act, 1897 (Report). Brisbane: Queensland Parliament.
- Roth, Walter E (1898). "Yi-din-ji Wordlist" (Document). AIATSIS Library, MF265: Manuscript.
