= Barbara McGrady =

Indigenous Australian photographer

- Born: 1950 (age 74–75); Mungindi, New South Wales, Australia
- Occupation(s): Photographer; Photojournalist

Barbara McGrady (born 1950) is an Aboriginal Australian photographer and photojournalist based in Sydney, New South Wales. She is the first Indigenous Australian photojournalist.

== Early life and education ==
Barbara McGrady was born in 1950 in Mungindi, New South Wales. She is a Gomeroi (Gamilaraay) and Murri woman, from the north-west of NSW and southern Queensland. Her aunts were removed from the family and sent to Cootamundra Girls' Home, while the men were sent to work as indentured labourers.

McGrady started taking photos of her family and surroundings as a teenager with a camera her mother bought her. Her fascination with photo journalism was sparked by black and white photographs of black sportsmen and sportswomen in magazines like Time and Life, National Geographic, Esquire and Reader's Digest.

She trained as a sociologist, and is an athlete and sports lover.

== Career ==
McGrady has been photographing political and social events of the Aboriginal and Torres Strait Islander peoples and families of the Redfern, Surry Hills, and Waterloo communities for 30 years from her perspective as a Gomeroi woman.

She is the first female Indigenous photojournalist in Australia.

She specialises in recording Indigenous Australian sporting figures and events. Among the famous people McGrady has photographed are prominent activist for Australia's First Nations People, Gary Foley, a human rights activist and historian at Victoria University, Melbourne, who is also a personal friend. According to Foley, McGrady is a "true historian" because she documents Aboriginal experience.

Her works include iconic images of Adam Goodes with Lewis Jetta and Lance (Buddy) Franklin and the Indigenous round in AFL football; world champion Aboriginal boxer Anthony "Choc" Mundine; the Koori Knockout Carnival (one of the biggest Indigenous gatherings in Australia); and the Sista Girls of the Sydney Mardi Gras. She has also photographed Prince Harry, as well as concerts by British singer Ed Sheeran, and American rappers Nelly and Snoop Dogg.

In 2020, her significant new audiovisual multi-channel installation, Ngiyaningy Maran Yaliwaunga Ngaara-li (Our Ancestors Are Always Watching), produced in collaboration with photographer and filmmaker John Janson-Moore, was presented at Campbelltown Arts Centre.

McGrady works as a freelancer, and as of 2019 is an active member of the Glebe community. She donates much time pro bono for community assignments.

== Publication and recognition ==
McGrady's work has been published in outlets such as NAIDOC, NITV, National Indigenous Times, Reconciliation Australia, Aboriginal Legal Service, and Gadigal Information Service.

McGrady features in "Through the Lens with Barbara McGrady", an episode in the 2013 documentary television series Desperate Measures. It is available on SBS on Demand.

=== Awards ===
- 2014: Anthony Mundine Courage Award, part of the inaugural National Indigenous Human Rights Awards
- 2015: Solid Screen International Award for Indigenous Women in Film and Photography, for photo media documentation

== Personal life ==
Despite the esteem in which McGrady is held as a photojournalist, she still faces everyday racism in Australia. She is a close friend of fellow photojournalist Lisa Hogben.

She suffers from COPD, which hinders her physical movement.

== Exhibitions ==
- 2013: Head On Festival; Visions in Black and White – Images from Indigenous Australia Redfern Community Centre, Sydney
- 2014: Head On Photographic Exhibition: McGrady held a one-woman exhibition of her work at The Rocks Discovery Museum 15 May to 20 July 2014
- 2017: Always Will Be, at the Australian Centre for Photography, 3 November – 9 December 2017, curated by Sandy Evans and complemented by NITV & ACP Online Resource (Note: The name refers to the saying "Always was, always will be Aboriginal land", associated with the Aboriginal land rights movement and other protests.)
- 2018: Inner City NAIDOC – Deadly Women of Redfern by Aunty Barbara McGrady
- 2020: Campbelltown Arts Centre
- 2020: Artist Talk with John Janson-Moore
- 2020: As part of the 2020 Biennale of Sydney, McGrady's work was hung in the Art Gallery of New South Wales. Her 2013 image of TJ Hickey's family was hung in the gallery's Entrance Court. However the Biennale was cancelled and the Gallery closed in line with the NSW government's social distancing regulations during the COVID-19 pandemic in Australia.
- 2023: Barbara McGrady: Australia Has a Black History, at the Chau Chak Wing Museum, December 2023 - June 2024.

== Collections ==
Some of McGrady's works are held in the Australian Museum in Sydney.
