= Gulgibarra =

Aboriginal Australian group

Coordinates: 17°13′52″S 145°56′56″E

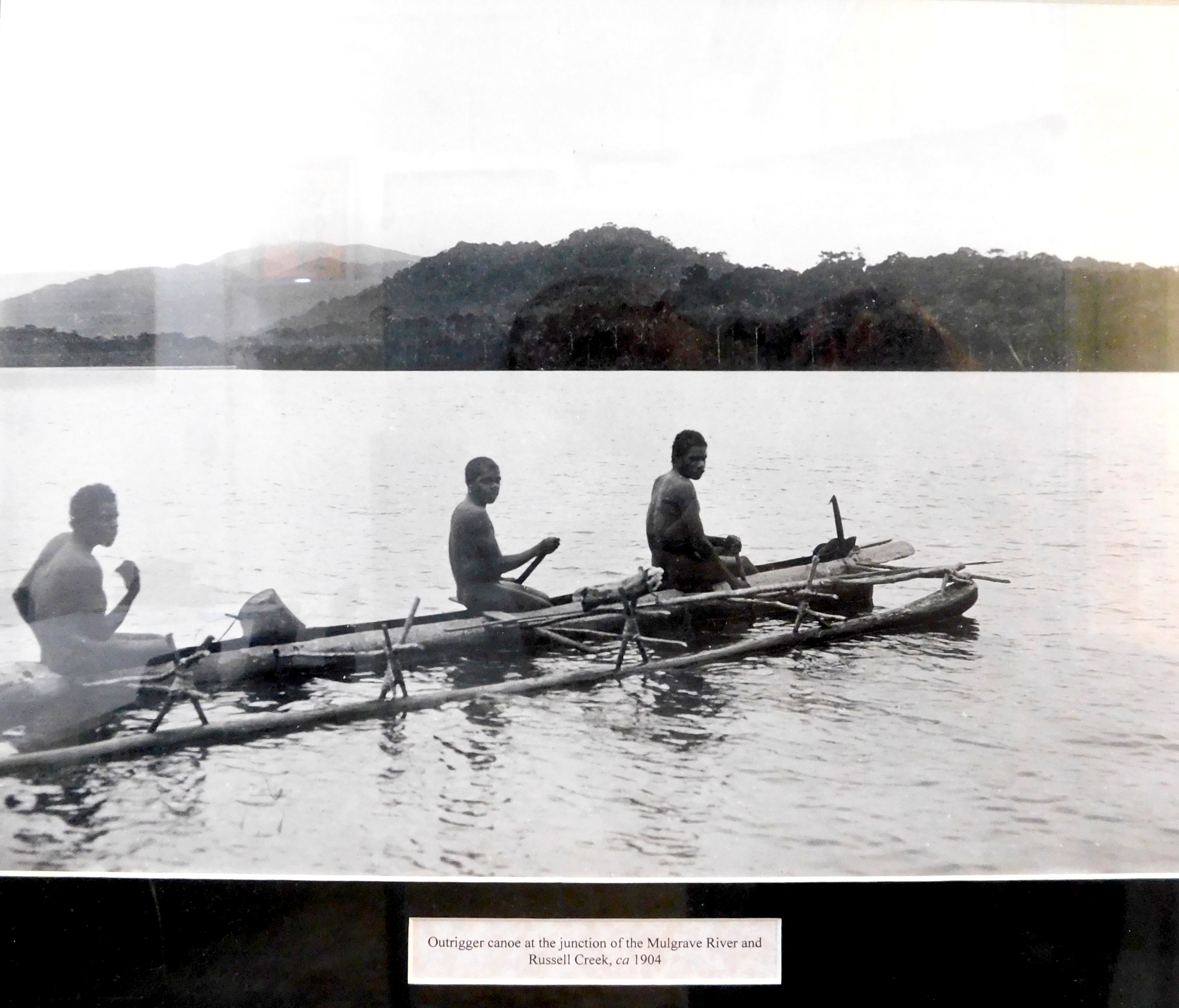
Gulgibarra c. 1904 — Outrigger canoe at the junction of the Mulgrave and Russell Rivers

Gulgibarra (aka gulgibara, koolgibbera) is the name for the local Aboriginal Australian group who are particularly associated with, and 'belong to', the sandy seashores and the lower saltwater reaches of the Mulgrave and Russell Rivers (aka Madjaybana) including the Mutchero Inlet, where 'the waters flow through sand' in North East Queensland's wet tropics

== Local Group ==
A local Aboriginal language speaker, Djariyi (aka Dick Moses) identified himself to linguist Robert M. W. Dixon as a member of the Gulgibarra.

Djariyi, together with a number of other local Aboriginal language speakers, taught Dixon that the original people of the Yarrabah -Cairns region (aka bama) are all members of one or other local groups and, if asked, can each identify themselves by attaching the affix barra (trans. 'belonging to') to a noun for the terrain to which they are particularly associated via conception, life history and more. Djariyi, for instance, attached the affix barra to the noun gulgi (trans. sand) to identify himself and his local group as Gulgibarra (i.e. 'belonging to the sand')

Other local groups neighbouring the Gulgibarra include:

- the Malanbarra (i.e. 'belonging to large flat rock') for the freshwater upper reaches of the Mulgrave River (and the Little Mulgrave) where the river flows across worn, flat rocks.
- the Jinggabarra (i.e. 'belonging to water spray') for the fast flowing freshwaters off the Wooroonooran National Park's Behana Gorge, feeding into the Mulgrave River to the north-west.
- the Bindabarra (i.e. 'belonging to shoulder') for the freshwater cascades flowing through Wooroonooran National Park's Babinda Boulders, feeding into the Russell River to the south-west.
- the Bagirgabarra (where Dixon translates bagirram as Tristaniopsis exiliflor aka water gum) for the coast and flatter wetlands to the south down to the North Johnstone River

== Local Language ==
Dixon maps the sandy seashores and lower reaches of the Mulgrave and Russell Rivers to which the Gulgibarra are particularly associated as an area where the once predominant language spoken was Madjay (reputably so called because they used the form madjay for spear) Madjay is classed as one of the dialects of the Yidinyic language/s

Dixon found there are no reliable 19th century or early 20th century records of Madjay being spoken, however he also found the Gulgibarra language speaker, Djariyi (aka Dick Moses), spoke a distinctively coastal version of the Yidinyic language/s, where a Gungay version was predominantly spoken on the Yarrabah promontory to the east; a Wanyur version spoken on the coast to the south, and a tablelands version spoken in the mountains to the west.

Aboriginal elders and family identifying themselves as "Madjay" language owners include Gulgibarra as one of the 'ancestral estates' within which Madjay was spoken (i.e. Madjandji country'), and they have produced a booklet recording language names for some of the most significant local minya (trans. 'edible flesh') and mayi (trans. 'edible plant') to be found in the Gulgibarra area (i.e. words for flying fox, southern cassowary, echidna, wild berry, burdekin plum, and wild ginger)

== Early Encounters ==
The Mulgrave and Russel Rivers were given their Queensland placenames by early colonist George Elphinstone Dalrymple on 18 November 1873 as part of his command of a Queensland North-East Coast expedition. When naming and exploring the lower reaches of these rivers, at that time, Dalrymple and others (including a botanist, Sub-inspector Johnstone, plus 10 mounted native police) were travelling amongst the Gulgibarra, reporting for instance "the blacks here are numerous but peaceable; they "cooey" to us occasionally".

Writing about the Gulgibarra, Dalrymple described their 'neat' and 'picturesque' round-topped palm-leaf guyahs, also describing their camp smoke curling up out of the tree tops up in the hill behind them, seeing them with rafts and canoes crossing the river ahead and/or fishing in outrigger canoes well furnished with fish spears, lines, hand nets etc.'. Dalrymple wrote:

"..in the dark, we passed close to numerous large fires of a blacks’ camp, blazing brilliantly on the river bank under the dark forest, giving, with the ruddy reflection in the broad river, the glow and dark shades of the surrounding jungle, combined with the loud yells with which we were hailed from the dense thickets as we passed, a wild and picturesque effect. Visiting the camp, then deserted, a few days later, we found that they had been feasting upon a large crocodile..".

At the entrance to the whole of these salty lower reaches of the Mulgrave and Russell Rivers are two sandy points reaching into the rivers' shared mouth (aka Mutchero Inlet), the northern point being named 'Flirt Point' and the southern being named 'Point Constantine'. Regarding the Gulgibarra, on 2 December 1873, Sub-inspector Johnstone and native police found on 'Point Constantine' a large bark gunyah, and hanging in the centre to that gunyah, with smoke under it, an emaciated body with knees doubled and tied to the chin, arms doubled and tied to the sides with split lawyer cane. Dalrymple wrote:

"Mr. Johnstone brought it [the body] on board, and I have had the pleasure of placing it in the Brisbane Museum. Mr. Johnstone left a couple of blankets and a tomahawk for the bereaved relatives, who would doubtless rightly appreciate the exchange.".

Another time, 1889, colonial botanist Frederick Manson Bailey collecting plants as part of a Queensland Government Botanical Expedition, encounters the Gulgibarra (which he spells koolgibberah) when he finds they crush and use an unnamed species of vine along the Mulgrave River to stun fish in the river's freshwater lagoons, naming the vine species Derris koolgiberrah and effectively preserving the Gulgibarra name within the species' nomenclature.

== Local Lore ==
Local Aboriginal elder, Murrai (aka Annie Wonga) and friends, in 2008, published some local lore for the lower Mulgrave and Russell River areas (including the Gulgibarra area) being ancestral stories coming down from time immemorial

== Sources ==
- Bottoms, Timothy (1992). The Bama : people of the rainforest : Aboriginal-European relations in the Cairns rainforest region up to 1876. Gadja Enterprises. ISBN 0646127276.
- Bottoms, Timothy (2015). Cairns: City of the South Pacific: A History 1770-1995. Bunu Bunu Press. ISBN 978-0-9944012-0-5.
- Dalrymple, George Elphinstone (1874). Narrative and reports of the Queensland North-East coast expedition 1873. Queensland Government Press, Brisbane. OCLC 271834761.
- Dixon, R. M. W. (1972). The Dyribal Language of North Queensland. Cambridge University Press. ISBN 9781139084987.
- Dixon, R. M. W. (1977). A Grammar of Yidin. Cambridge University Press. ISBN 978-0-521-21462-9.
- Dixon, R. M. W. (1991). Words of our country: stories, placenames and vocabulary in Yidiny, the Aboriginal language of the Cairns - Yarrabah region. University of Queensland Press. ISBN 0-7022-2360-3. OCLC 881571304.
- "First People's history & languages". Cairns Regional Council. 5 October 2021.
- Wanyurr Majay Aboriginal Corporation RNTBC (2021). Madjandji: Nyanggaaji minya mayi. Tropica Studio, Gubuda (Gordonvale). ISBN 978-0-6453530-0-6.
- Wonga Friends Committee (2008). Bunna Binda: Babinda Stories told ny Murrai (Annie Wonga) (PDF). Babinda Hospital & Community Welfare Inc. ISBN 978-0-6453530-0-6.
