= Mona Mona Aboriginal Mission =

Mona Mona Mission
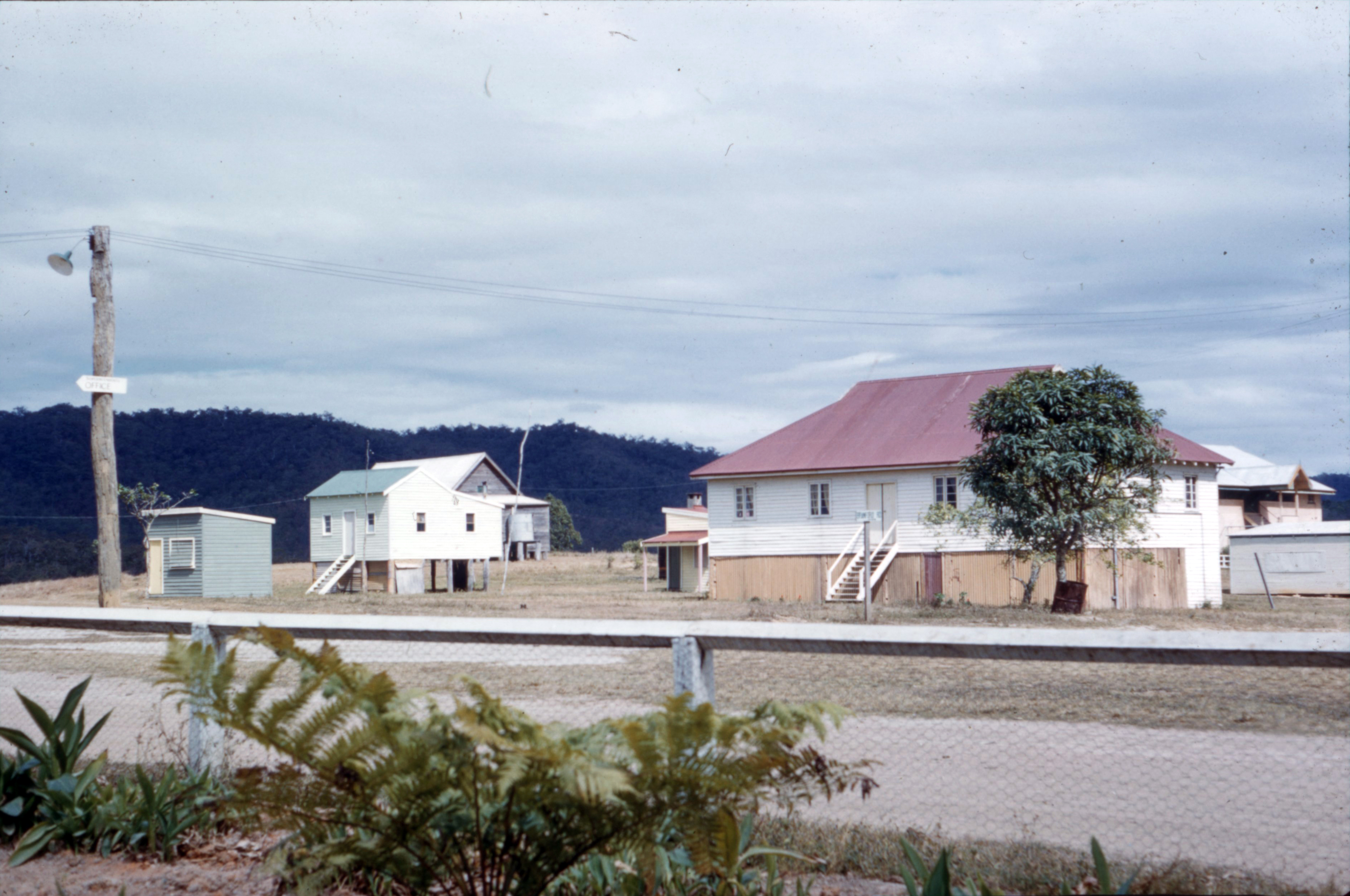
- Mona Mona Hospital, 1959

- Coordinates: 16°42′45.8″S 145°32′19″E
- Country: Australia
- State: Queensland
- Postcode: 4881

The Mona Mona Aboriginal Mission is a former Seventh-day Adventist mission for Aboriginal people established around 1913 near Kuranda, Queensland, Australia, now within the locality of Mona Mona.

== History ==
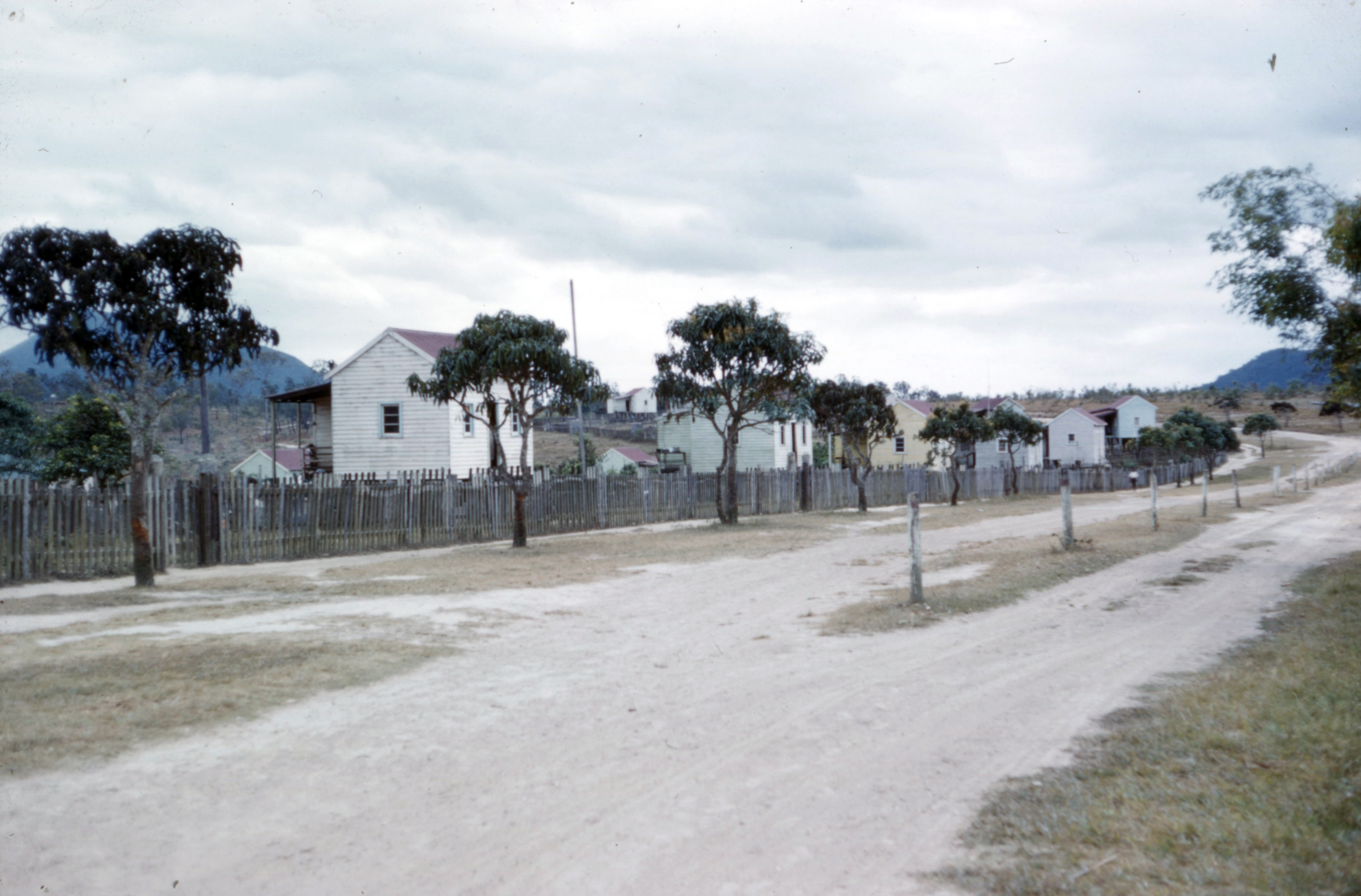
Main street, Mona Mona Aboriginal Mission, 1959

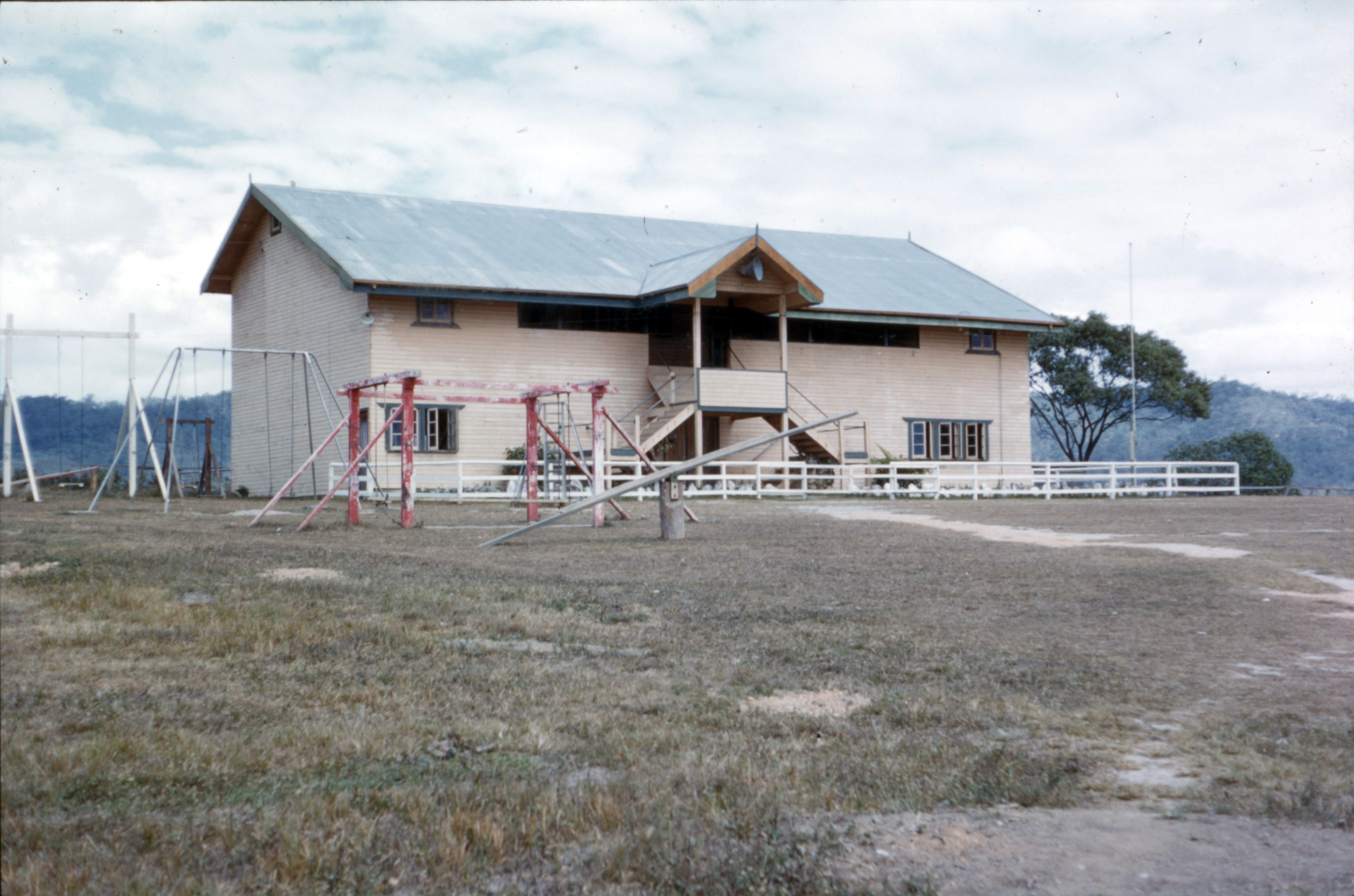
School at the mission, 1959

In 1913, large numbers of people, particularly of the Djabugay people, were rounded up and forcibly taken to the mission. Until 1940 it was almost self-sufficient, growing its own food, and cutting and milling timber. After this period, soil fertility deteriorated and with the increasing costs, the mission soon became unviable. Also the city of Cairns was growing and needed more water. A decision was made to flood Flaggy Creek, which flowed through the mission land and would have flooded the mission houses.

In 1962 the mission was closed and the people were removed to other missions in places such as Great Palm Island and Woorabinda. However the dam did not go ahead, and some Djabugay people and former residents have moved back to Mona Mona and built houses. They have been waiting for the Queensland Government to consider building new houses for all residents and other infrastructure, including a school.

In 2010, the Queensland Government gave the local Indigenous people a 30-year lease over 1,600 hectares (4,000 acres) of the Mona Mona mission site.

== See also ==
- List of reduplicated Australian place names
