= Always was, always will be =

Statement within First Nations communities

"Always was, always will be Aboriginal land", sometimes abbreviated to "Always was, always will be" or just "Always will be", is an iconic phrase and rallying cry of the Aboriginal land rights movement in Australia.

== Origin ==
The phrase is said to have originated in the 1980s, with the Barkandji people in far-western New South Wales, who were fighting for legal recognition and rights as sovereign owners of their homelands. The campaign was led by William Bates, which saw the first national park in NSW returned to its traditional owners. On one of his trips to Country during the campaign, William Bates' father, Jim Bates, was telling his son stories of the land. William said, "Dad, it’s not your land any more, whitefellas own it"; his father replied, "No, they only borrowed it; it always was, and always will be Aboriginal land."

== Meaning ==
The phrase asserts that Aboriginal peoples were the first on the continent now known as Australia, occupying and caring for the land for more than 65,000 years, and that the sovereignty of the country has never been ceded. It is sometimes shortened to "Always was, always will be."

It is commonly chanted at protests, rallies and celebrations by Indigenous and non-Indigenous people in Australia, and is synonymous with Aboriginal and Torres Strait Islander land rights, self-determination and sovereignty. It also responds to the lack of recognition Aboriginal and Torres Strait Islander peoples receive in relation to sovereignty, and as a fundamental understanding about the truth of Australia, but sometimes presents a challenge when dealing with Australian immigrant communities.

== Uses ==
"Always was, always will be" is sometimes incorporated into the Welcome to Country. In 2020, "Always Was, Always Will Be" was selected as the theme for NAIDOC Week.

Always was, always will be was the name of a temporary art installation (2012–2017) by Reko Rennie in Taylor Square, Sydney. A 2017 exhibition of photographs in Sydney by Aboriginal Australian photojournalist Barbara McGrady was titled Always Will Be.

Following the start of the Gaza war in October 2023, the phrase has often been paired with "from the river to the sea" by Aboriginal activist groups, in solidarity with Palestinians. "From the river to the sea / always was, always will be" was a frequent slogan encountered in the 2025 Invasion Day rallies held in cities across Australia.
