= Australian Butterfly Sanctuary =

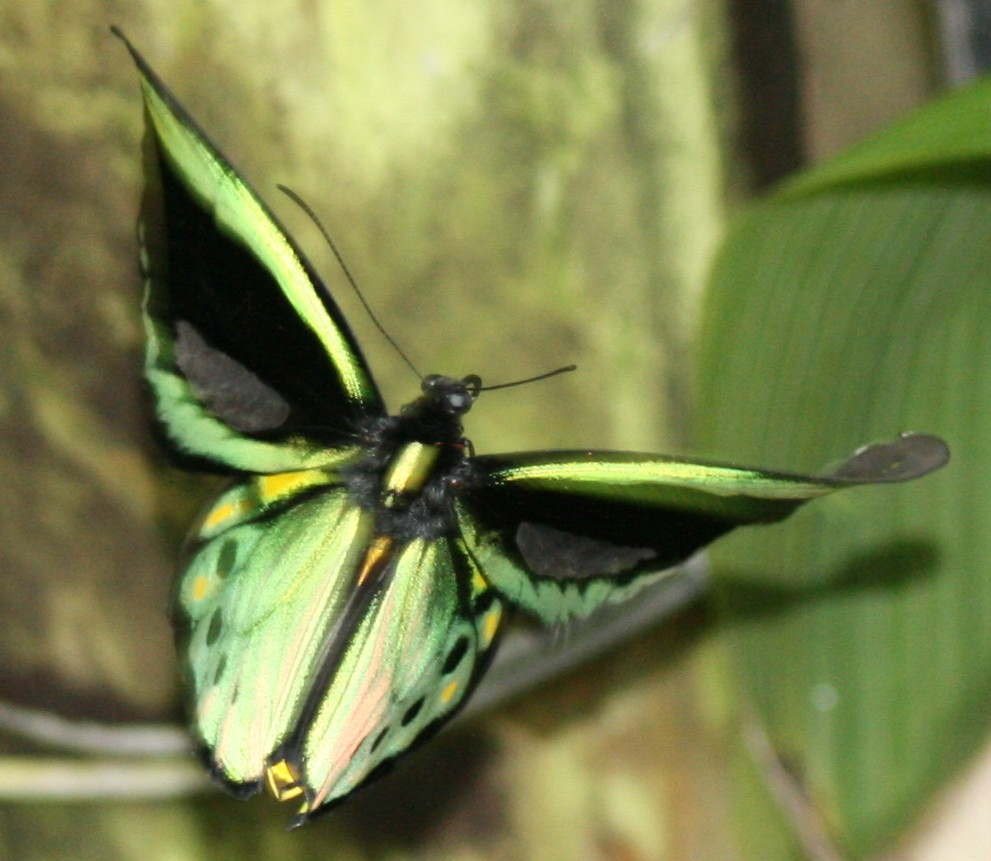
- Male Cairns birdwing in flight in the aviary
- Interactive map of Australian Butterfly Sanctuary
- 16.8204646°S 145.6330483°E
- Date opened: 1987
- Location: Kuranda, Queensland, Australia
- No. of animals: 1,500
- Website: www.australianbutterflies.com

The Australian Butterfly Sanctuary is a butterfly sanctuary and exhibit situated in the centre of Kuranda, Queensland, Australia.

Kuranda Butterfly Sanctuary is listed by the Guinness Book of Records as Australia's largest butterfly flight aviary and exhibit. The sanctuary rears a variety of butterflies, most of which are native to Far North Queensland, including the vibrant Cairns Birdwing Butterfly. The lab breeds about 30,000 caterpillars each year, and sends about 24,000 pupae to be released in the aviary.

There are around 1500 free flying butterflies from a variety of species.

== History ==
The sanctuary was conceived, designed, and built by Paul and Susan Wright in 1987.

In July 2004, Charles & Pip Woodward of the CaPTA Group joined Paul and Sue right in an equal partnership. The CaPTA Group bought the remaining share of the Australian Butterfly Sanctuary a few years later.

In April 2005, the breeding laboratories were upgraded to allow viewing by educational groups.

== Butterflies and moths ==
The Australian Butterfly Sanctuary is home to around 1500 free-flying butterflies. All butterflies are raised in the sanctuaries laboratory from caterpillar to pupa stages. Butterflies are released daily from the laboratory into the aviary.

Species on display include:

- Ulysses butterfly (Papilio ulysses)
- Cairns birdwing butterfly (Ornithoptera euphorion)
- Red lacewing butterfly (Cethosia chrysippe)
- Cruiser butterfly (Vindula arsinoe)
- Australian lurcher butterfly (Yoma sabina)
- Orchard swallowtail butterfly (Papilio aegeus)
- Orange lacewing (Cethosia penthesilea)
- Hercules moth (Coscinocera hercules)
- Silk moth (Bombyx mori)
- Common eggfly butterfly (Hypolimnas bolina)
- Blue banded eggfly (Hypolimnas alimena)
- Monarch butterfly (Danaus plexippus)

== Television ==
The Australian Butterfly Sanctuary appeared in Better Homes and Gardens in which Dr Harry Cooper explored the aviary and met its colourful residents. The park was also featured in the first season of Helloworld with Bec Hewitt.
