= Djabugay =

Australian Aboriginal people

Djabugay people
- Aka: Tjapukai (Tindale), Djabuganjdji (Horton); Jaabugay (AIATSIS), Dyaabugay (SIL)
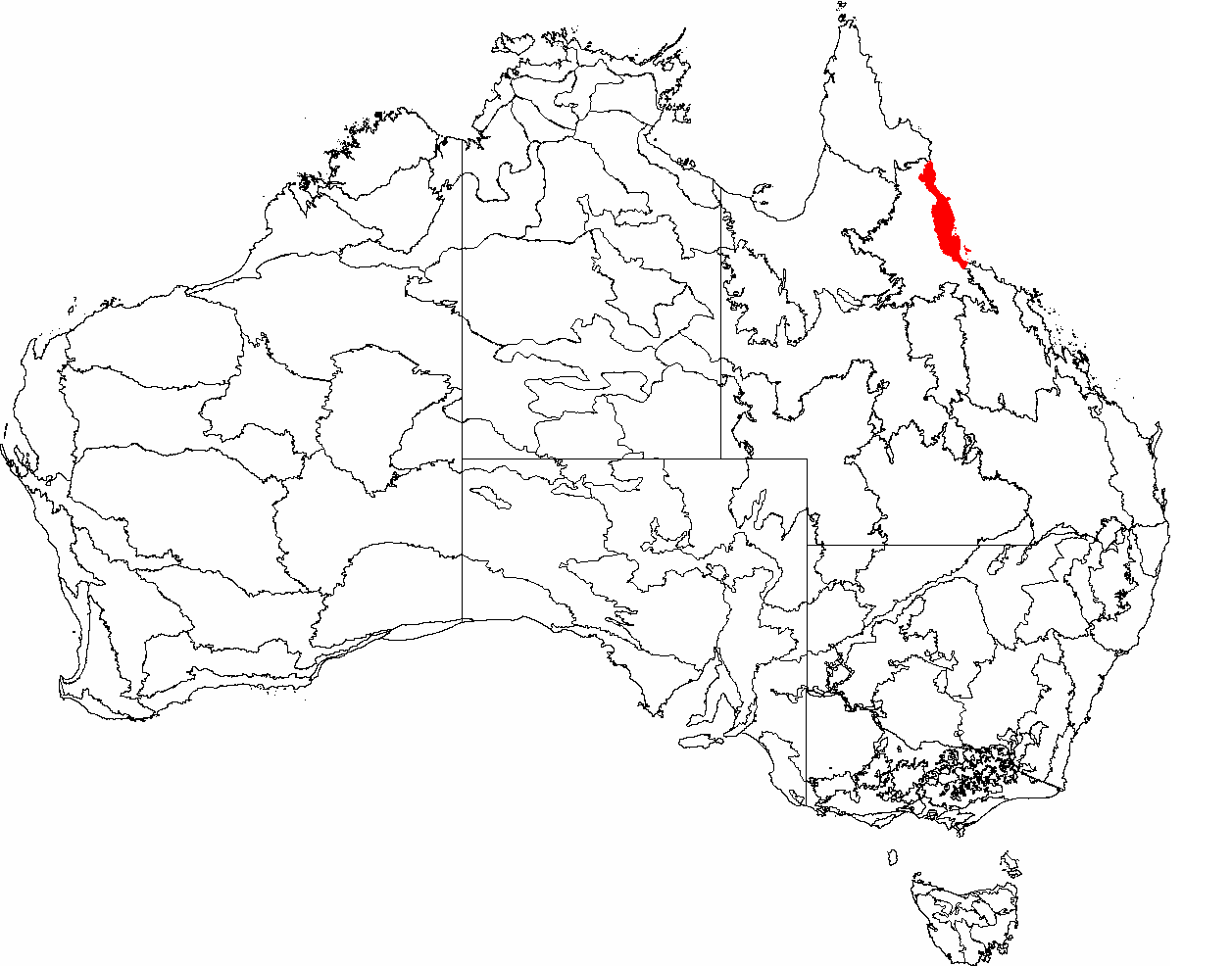
- Wet Tropics Bioregion

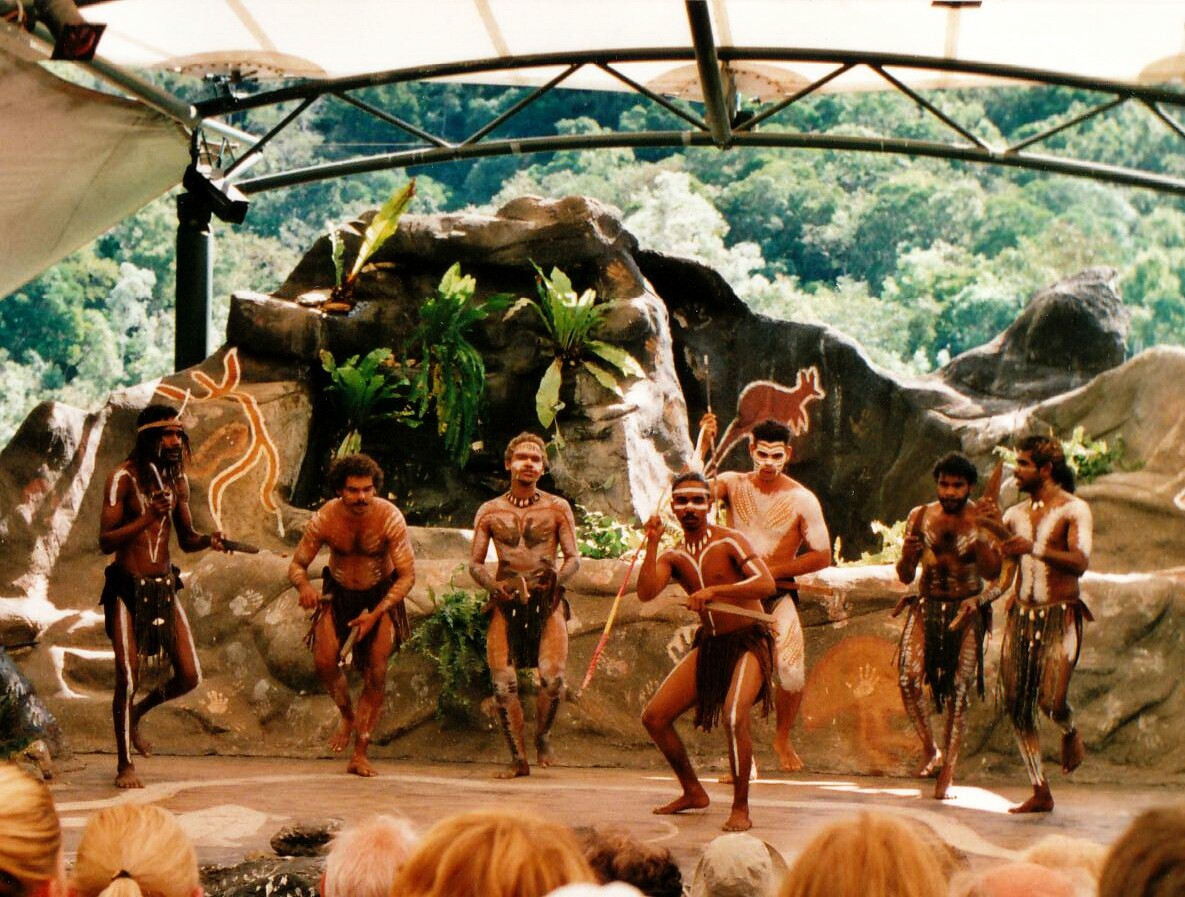
- Tjapukai performance in Cairns

Hierarchy
- Language Family: Pama–Nyungan
- Language Branch: Yidinic
- Language Group: Djabugay
- Group Dialects: Djabugay, Guluy; Ngunbay, Bulway, Yirrgay

Area (approx. 800 km^{2})
- BioRegion: Wet Tropics
- Location: Far North Queensland
- Coordinates: 16°50′S 145°30′E
- Mountains: Black Mountain (also known as Bunda Gabagn); Macalister Range (also known as Bunda Bundarra); Lamb Range (also known as Bunda Djarruy Gimbul)
- Rivers: Barron River (also known as Bana Wuruu), Mowbray River
- Other Geological: Barron Falls; (also known as Din Din); Barron Gorge (also known as Djirri Nyundu Nyrrumba); Double Island; (also known as Wangal Djungay)
- Urban Areas: Cairns (also known as Ngunbay ), Mount Molloy; Port Douglas

The Djabugay people (also known as Djabuganydji or Tjapukai) are a group of Aboriginal Australian people who are the original inhabitants of mountains, gorges, lands and waters of a richly forested part of the Great Dividing Range including the Barron Gorge and surrounding areas within the Wet Tropics of Queensland.

== Language ==
Djabugay belongs to the Yidinic branch of the Pama–Nyungan language family, and is closely related to Yidin. It shares the distinction, with Bandjalang in north-eastern New South Wales and South East Queensland, and Maung spoken on the Goulburn Islands off the coast of Arnhem Land, of being one of only three languages that lack the dual form. The last speaker with a good knowledge of the language was Gilpin Banning.

== Country ==
Norman Tindale described the territory of the Tjapukai (Djabugay) as extending along the plateau south of and to the east of south of Mareeba, from Barron River, south of Mareeba to Kuranda and north toward Port Douglas. Their western boundary was defined by the margin of the rain forest from Tolga north to Mount Molloy. By 1952, the Djabugay had also claimed the coastal strip between Cairns Inlet and Lamb Range, with one horde living near Redlynch, Cairns. (Note: Cairns was known among the Yidinji people as Gimuy, slippery blue fig tree (Ficus albipila) which is common to the area (Dixon 1991, p. 1).)

== Mythology ==
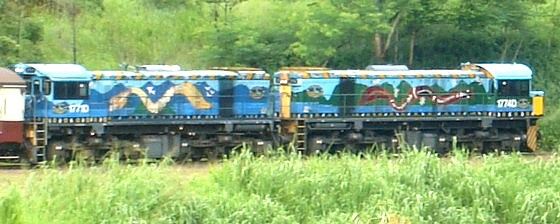
Buda-dji painted onto the front the Queensland Rail engine ascending the Barron Gorge, to Kuranda

The Djabugay word for their ancestral times, beyond their living memory, (also known as 'Story time' or 'Dreamtime') is bulurru. This was a time when, for instance, it is told the Rainbow Serpent Gudju Gudju, in the form of a giant carpet snake (aka Budadji) traveled through the country, bartering with families along the way for rainforest products such as dilly bags) in exchange for coastal nautilus shells, his body creating within the landscape everything from Yaln giri (Crystal Cascades) to Ngunbay (Kuranda), moving through the Mowbray River to the hill at Port Douglas, finally coming to rest at Wangal Djungay (Double Island). In one account, he was killed by emu men at 'Din din (the Barron Falls), an incident which unleashed the powerful monsoonal rains on the region. There were also 2 Bulurru dreamtime brothers, Damarri and Guyala, who laid down the contours, created the plant foods, and established the customary law and the system of clan marriage by moieties. The contours of the Barron River and Redlynch Valley, for example, are thought of as representing the supine body of Damarri.

The tale of Budadji's travels along the Barron Gorge is included in the web guide of Queensland Rail to the railways journey from Cairns to Kuranda.

== History ==
European settlers explored and cleared the land for gold and tin. "Dispersals," the euphemism for massacring groups of native Australians, were undertaken at Smithfield (1878), at Biboohra near the Clohesy River close to Kuranda in the early 1880s, and also near Mareeba in 1881.

In May 1886, a railway was constructed from Cairns to Herberton with part of the rails going on top of a walking track. The Djabugay were unhappy about this development and withstood the settlement by spearing bullocks and settlers. As the settlers entered, traditional hunting and gathering grounds were taken over.

This led to the notorious Speewah massacre in 1890 where John Atherton took revenge on the Djabugay by sending in native troopers to avenge the killing of a bullock. The Djabugay were segregated from them and forced to live at the Mona Mona Aboriginal Mission and were unable to hunt, fish, or move around. Their numbers fell dramatically at the turn of the century.

By 1896, the region supported coffee plantations, and the Djabugay were used as labour on farms.

Many now own their own land, namely some other settlements and farms in the area.

On 17 December 2004, it was recognised that native title existed in the Barron Gorge National Park for the Djabugay.

== Native title ==
All Djabugay peoples share, in common, descent from ancestors who (a) have been given personal names that are sourced from, spoken in, and almost exclusively belong to the Djabugay languages (or dialects) and who (b) have transmitted, from generation to generation, Djabugay language (or dialects), Djabugay knowledge, Djabugay tradition, Djabugay heritage, plus Djabugay law.

In 2004, Justice Jeffrey Spender, a Federal Court judge, in analysing Djabugay land claims in terms of Australian legislation regarding native title, touched on the concept of bulurru and affirmed that for them the geomorphic features of the area affirm the truth of the laws instituted by the dreamtime, and are taken as tangible proof of bulurru and the totemic beings in Djabugay country. It followed that the physical landscape, its "storyplaces" and "storywaters" in bulurru tradition underline the 'inalienable connection between the native claimants, their ancestral beings and the land.

In land title claims, there was a long running dispute between the Djabugay and the Yirrganydji the latter claiming native title to the area from Cairns to Port Douglas. The clash arose out of the siting of the Tjapukai Aboriginal Cultural Park. Though some Djabuguy wished their claim to be included under the general claim, regarding them as part of the Dajabugay people, the Yirrganydji insisted on maintaining their separate identity. Eventually the two corporations representing the groups came to a compromise agreement.

== Notable people ==
- David Hudson
- Evie Ferris

== Sources ==
- Bottoms, Timothy (1999). Djabugay Country: An Aboriginal History of Tropical North Queensland. Allen & Unwin. ISBN 978-1-865-08031-4.
- Dixon, R. M. W. (1991). Words of Our Country: Stories, Placesd Names and Vocabulary in Yidiny, the Aboriginal Language nof the Cairns, Rarrabah Region (PDF). University of Queensland Press. ISBN 978-0-702-22360-0.
- Dixon, R. M. W. (2011a). Searching for Aboriginal Languages: Memoirs of a Field Worker. Cambridge University Press. ISBN 978-1-108-02504-1.
- Dixon, R. M. W. (2011b). The Languages of Australia. Cambridge University Press. ISBN 978-1-108-01785-5.
- "Djabugay people: The native title determination" (PDF). National Native Title Tribunal. 17 December 2004.
- "Djabugay v Queensland [2004] FCA 1652". Agreements, Treaties and Negotiated Settlements (ATNS) project. 27 May 2005.
- Duffin, Rhonda; Brim, Rosetta (1993). Ngapi Garrang Bulurru-m: All Things Come from Bulurru. Cairns. ISBN 0-646-09380-0.
- Henry, Rosita (1998). "Performing protest, articulating difference: environmentalists, Aborigines and the Kuranda Skyrail dispute" (PDF). Aboriginal History. 22: 143–161.
- Henry, Rosita (2012). Performing Place, Practising Memories: Aboriginal Australians, Hippies and the State. Berghahn Books. ISBN 978-0-857-45509-3.
- Morton-Evans, Christine; Morton-Evans, Michael (2009). The Flower Hunter: The Remarkable Life of Ellis Rowan. National Library of Australia. ISBN 978-0-642-27701-5.
- Pannell, Sandra (2009). "Cultural Landscapes in the Wet Tropics". In Stork, Nigel; Turton, Stephen M. (eds.). Living in a Dynamic Tropical Forest Landscape. John Wiley & Sons. ISBN 978-1-444-30033-8.
- Stone, Derrick (2016). Walks, Tracks and Trails of Queensland's Tropics. Csiro Publishing. ISBN 978-1-486-30308-3.
- "The Story of Buda-dji". Queensland Rail. 2016.
- Tindale, Norman (1974). Aboriginal Tribes of Australia, Tjapukai (QLD). Australian National University Press.
