= Yidinyic languages =

Yidinyic
- Geographic distribution: Australia
- Linguistic classification: Pama–Nyungan: Yimidhirr–Yalanji–Yidinic; Yidinyic
- Subdivisions: Djabugay; Yidiny

Language codes
- Glottolog: yidi1249

The Yidinyic languages are a pair of languages, previously classified as Paman, proposed to form a separate branch of the Pama–Nyungan family. They are:

- Djabugay
- Yidiny

However, Bowern (2011) only separates out Yidiny itself, leaving Djabugay in Paman.

== Djabugay ==
The Djabugay language is spoken primarily by five major ethnic groups populated around the Barron River: the Djabuganydji, Bulwanydji, Nyagali, Yirrganydji, and Gulunydji. Due to its endangered status, many conservation efforts that aim to preserve their cultures and language have been put in place, such as the Djabugay Bulmba Rangers Program in North Queensland. Today, according to the 2021 consensus, the language has 81 native speakers, and is severely endangered; however, many of these speakers speak local dialects of the language, including Yirrgay and Bulway. Most experts agree with Bowern (2011) that the language belongs to the Pama–Nyungan language family tree, though, due to its similarities to other Paman languages.
